= Tango with Cows =

1914 poetry book by Kamensky and ill. by the Burliuk brothers

Tango With Cows: Ferro-Concrete Poems (Russian; Танго С Коровами: Железобетонные Поэмы) is an artists' book by the Russian Futurist poet Vasily Kamensky, with additional illustrations by brothers David Burliuk and Vladimir Burliuk. With a limited press production in Moscow of only 300 copies in 1914, the work has become famous primarily for being made entirely of commercially produced wallpaper, with a series of concrete poems - visual poems that employ unusual typographic layouts for expressive effect - printed onto the recto (front) of each page.

== Origins of Russian futurism ==
=== Hylaea ===
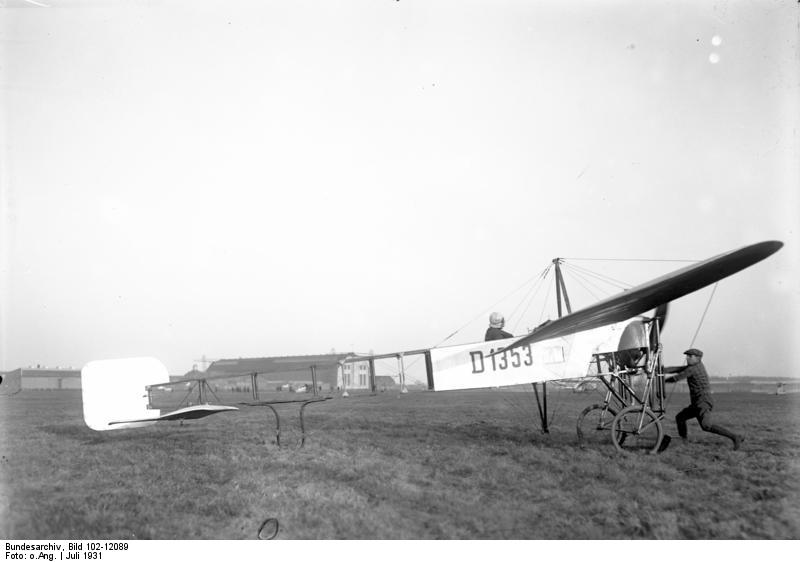
A Blériot XI

Kamensky had been one of the first Russians to master flight, piloting a Blériot XI after taking lessons from Louis Blériot himself, until a crash in 1912 persuaded him to retire;

"Kamensky’s tenure as a pilot was short-lived. The poet’s aerial career met an abrupt end only a few months after he had earned his wings. Following a near-fatal crash into a muddy bog, Kamensky abandoned aviation and returned to literature. Still, the airborne experiences profoundly shaped his artistic vision. In the years to come, Kamensky worked to incorporate the sights, sounds, and sensations of the new technology into his poetry and prose. The result was a series of radically new works that helped shape Cubo-Futurism and, in doing so, contributed to the rise of modern aesthetics."

He became involved in Hylaea, the avant-garde group centred on the brothers David, Nikolay and Vladimir Burliuk at around the same time. Hylaea was the ancient Greek name for the Kherson region where the Burliuks owned an estate, and the name was intended to evoke a 'poetic suggestion... of a trend in art and literature [to look] back to prehistory in order to build the future.' Kamensky and Velimir Khlebnikov joined almost immediately; Vladimir Mayakovsky and Aleksei Kruchenykh shortly after.

All of these men shared a taste for outrage, as well as a predilection for publishing artists' books; the first product of the group was the scandalous A Slap In The Face of Public Taste 1912, which featured a number of manifestos and was bound in burlap. Tango With Cows would follow two years later, and included three drawings by David and Vladimir Burliuk to support Kamensky's poems.

=== Cubo-Futurism ===
An inner spread from Tango With Cows. This copy is in MoMA.

Around 1913 the group became known as cubo-futurists, originally coined in a lecture by the critic Chukovsky referring to the group's stylistic similarities both to French Cubism and to the Italian avant-garde poet Marinetti's new movement (Italian) futurism, with its emphasis on speed and modernity. Adopted by the members of Hylaea – in part to utilise the immense publicity Marinetti was reaping all over Europe – their attitude to Marinetti himself, when he visited St Petersburg and Moscow in January 1914, was considerably more ambiguous.

Either by accident or design, Mayakovsky, Burliuk and Kamensky were on a poetry-reading tour of the southern provinces, and so missed Marinetti's visit to Moscow. Moving on to St Petersburg, Livshits and Khlebnikov were awaiting the Italian with a planned boycott of his lecture – avoided at the very last moment.

'The need for fisticuffs became most urgent during an altercation with Livshits at a dinner party. The dispute polarized over their differences regarding the idea of transreason. Marinetti would not budge from his conviction that transrational language was nothing more than the Russian version of his concept of liberated words and wireless imagination while Livshits just as stubbornly claimed that transreason was an altogether different notion, probing deeper into the ontology of the poetic word. In any case, on that evening wild "liberated words" darted back and forth across the table, and soon the literary dispute degenerated into a nationalistic squabble that had little to do with poetry.'

"From this time [1913] Kamensky was an invariable participant in Futurist collections, newspapers, journals, and public appearances." Tango With Cows was his first attempt at publishing futurist verse, and displays clear echoes of Marinetti's contemporary book of concrete poetry, Zang Tumb Tumb.

== The book itself ==
The ferro-concrete poem Constantinople from Tango With Cows.

=== Ferro-concrete poems ===
Beginning with a drawing by Vladimir Burliuk of a woman, the poems are split into two sections; the first contains 8 concrete poems that use multiple fonts and unusual spacings to express sounds and textures. Telephone, for instance, starts with 'Telephone No. 2B_128 / rgrgrrrrrr______rrg'. The second group of 6 are arranged within diagonal grids, that evoke both the cubist paintings of Picasso and Braque, and the moulds that are used to make reinforced concrete. These poems refer directly to aerial views, maps and floor-plans.

"The visual construction of the poem 'Shchukin Museum' consisted of a big square divided into several segments, separated by line, with words and names of artists inside of each; one had Matisse, and word associations with his paintings; another Monet with the exclamation "No!" next to it; another Picasso etc. The arrangement exactly follows the display of paintings in the museum, room by room. Kamenskii energetically involves his reader in a dialogue, an interaction, as if inviting him to come along.... [allowing] his reader-companion to wander, to get through the poem and make sense of it in his own way. A Futurist author always avoids closure... enabling his reader-spectator to become a co-author, a co-creator." Nina Gurionova

In Constantinople the poem lists apparently random words (and parts of words) that might be encountered on a trip to the Turkish city; 'Here, one encounters “sailors” (матросы), “mullahs” (муллы), and “seagulls” (чайки). There, one can glimpse the “shores” of the “Bosphorous” (берег — Босфор) and the ancient cathedral “Hagia Sophia” (Ай Софи).' Eschewing a traditional linear development, the poem instead evokes the view from an aeroplane overhead;

"It is only when we recall Kamensky’s experience as an aviator that “Constantinople” makes sense. The visually arresting, unreadable composition is a literal word-map depicting the city’s architectural features, inhabitants, and urban neighborhoods as experienced from overhead while looking down from an airplane. Little-known beyond a small circle of Russian literary and cultural scholars, “Constantinople” is one of the earliest and most important examples of aviation’s vital role in transforming twentieth-century art." Scott W Palmer

Both sets are interspersed with a single drawing by David Burliuk; done in a cubo-futurist style, the first might be of a woman, the second seems to depict an old man.

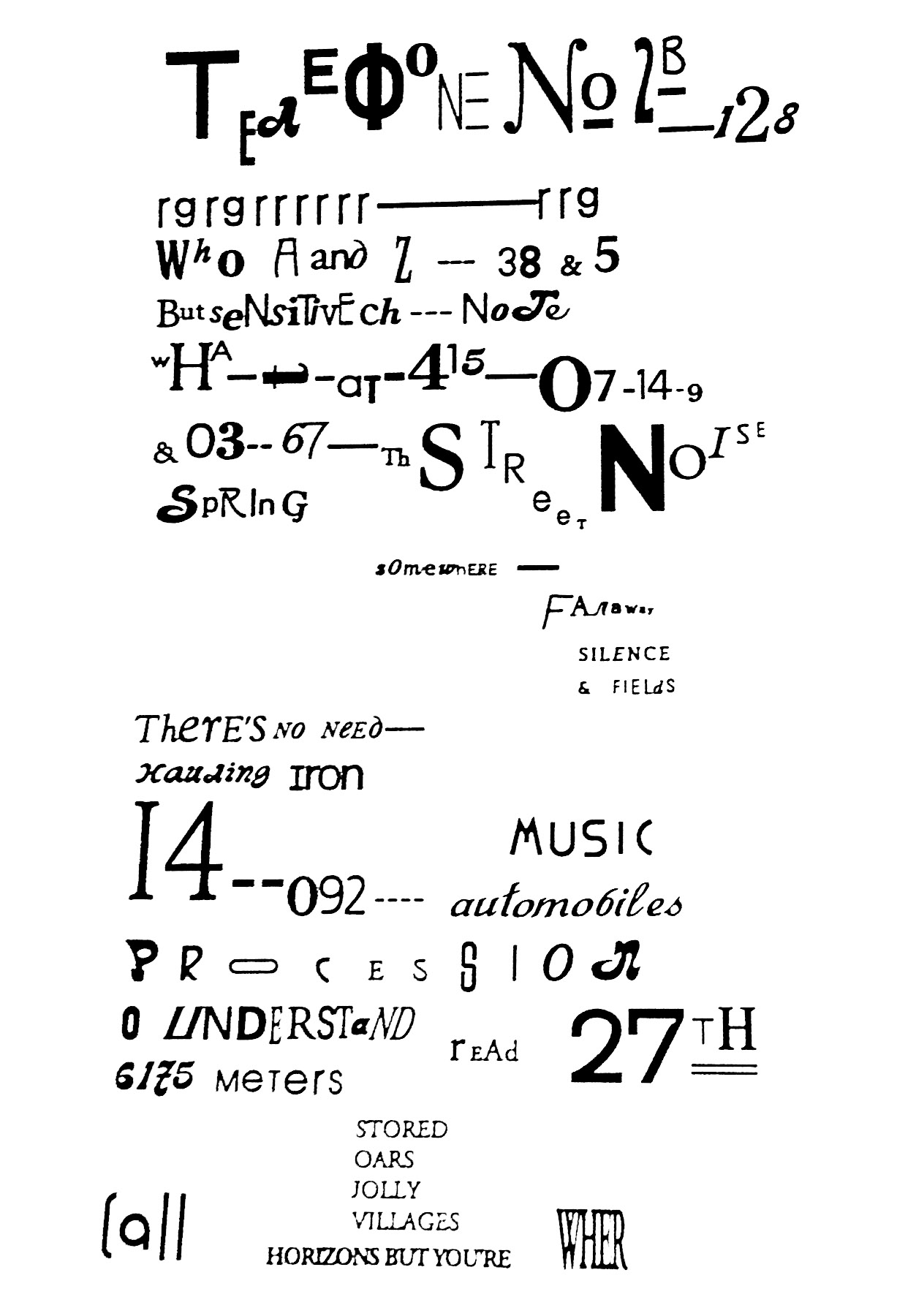
Visual translation, “Telephone” by Kamensky

=== Tango With Cows (poem) ===
Life is shorter than the squeal of a sparrow.
Like a dog, regardless, sailing
on an ice floe down the river in spring?
With tinned mirth
we look at our destiny.
We - the discoverers of countries -
conquerors of the air -
kings of orange groves
and cattle.
Perhaps we will drink
a glass of wine
to the health of the comets,
expiring diamond blood.
Or better still – we’ll get a record player.
Well, to hell with you! -
hornless and ironed!
I want one - to dance one
tango with cows
and to build bridges -
from the tears
of bovine jealousy
to the tears
of crimson girls.

== Reviews ==
Tango with Cows... offers a tour of Moscow's urban entertainment. In his "ferro-concrete" (reinforced concrete) poems, Vasily Kamensky replaced grammar and syntax with a spatial arrangement of words that celebrates concrete as a dynamic force in the invention of the modern city. The artists discarded customary book materials and printed Tango on cheap wallpaper as a parody of urban bourgeois taste. By juxtaposing the urban tango—an erotic Argentine dance that arrived in Russia in 1913 via Paris—with the cows of rural Russia, Kamensky captured the tension poets and artists felt between the recovery of a rural past and the allure of an urban present in creating their art of the future.

== Touring the new aesthetic ==
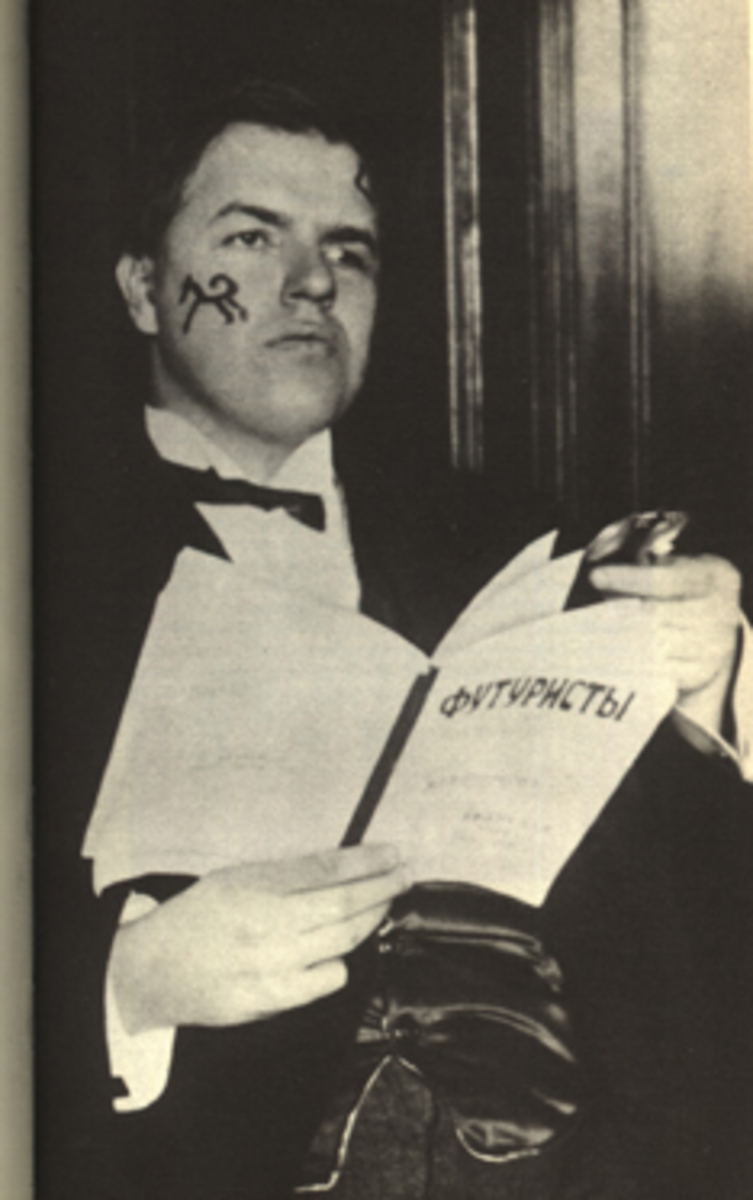
David Burliuk on tour, 1914.

The group became notorious for scandalous public recitals, wearing painted faces and 'ridiculous clothes'.

“From December 1913 to April 1914, the notoriety of the Cubo-Futurists reached its peak as Burliuk, Maiakovsky, and Kamensky toured 17 cities in the Russian Empire. The appearance of the Futurists (they liked to wear gaudy waistcoats, sometimes painted animals on their faces and wore carrots in their lapels) and their ‘performances,’ which included drinking tea on stage under a suspended piano, drew packed audiences, scandalized many, but also won converts to the new art.” Dr. Shkandrij

The spat with Marinetti, intended to unify and strengthen the group, had the opposite effect; the Cubo-futurists were to split under the strain. Khlebnikov was the first to leave, retreating to Astrakhan to work on his dream of a Society of Globe Presidents; Livshits joined the army; Kruchenykh fled the revolution to the relative calm of Tiflis; David Burliuk eventually reached the USA.

Kamensky himself welcomed the revolution, and was to play a minor part in Ossip Brik and Mayakovsky's LEF, an artistic organisation aimed at unifying left-wing artists to help build a communist state.

== Editions of Tango With Cows and Naked Among The Clad ==
The book was published in an edition of 300; a sister edition entitled Нагой среди Одетьіх (Naked Among The Clad) by Kamensky with Andrei Kravtsov was also published in an edition of 300 the same year; it too featured ferro-concrete poems - including some that also featured in Tango - and was again printed onto cheap wallpaper.

Copies of Tango With Cows are held in a number of prestigious public collections, including MOMA, the Getty Center and the British Library.

== See also ==
- Russian Futurism
- BÏF§ZF+18, an artist's book by the Italian futurist Ardengo Soffici.
- The cubo-futurist poet Vladimir Mayakovsky.
