= Cubo-Futurism =

Russian art movement

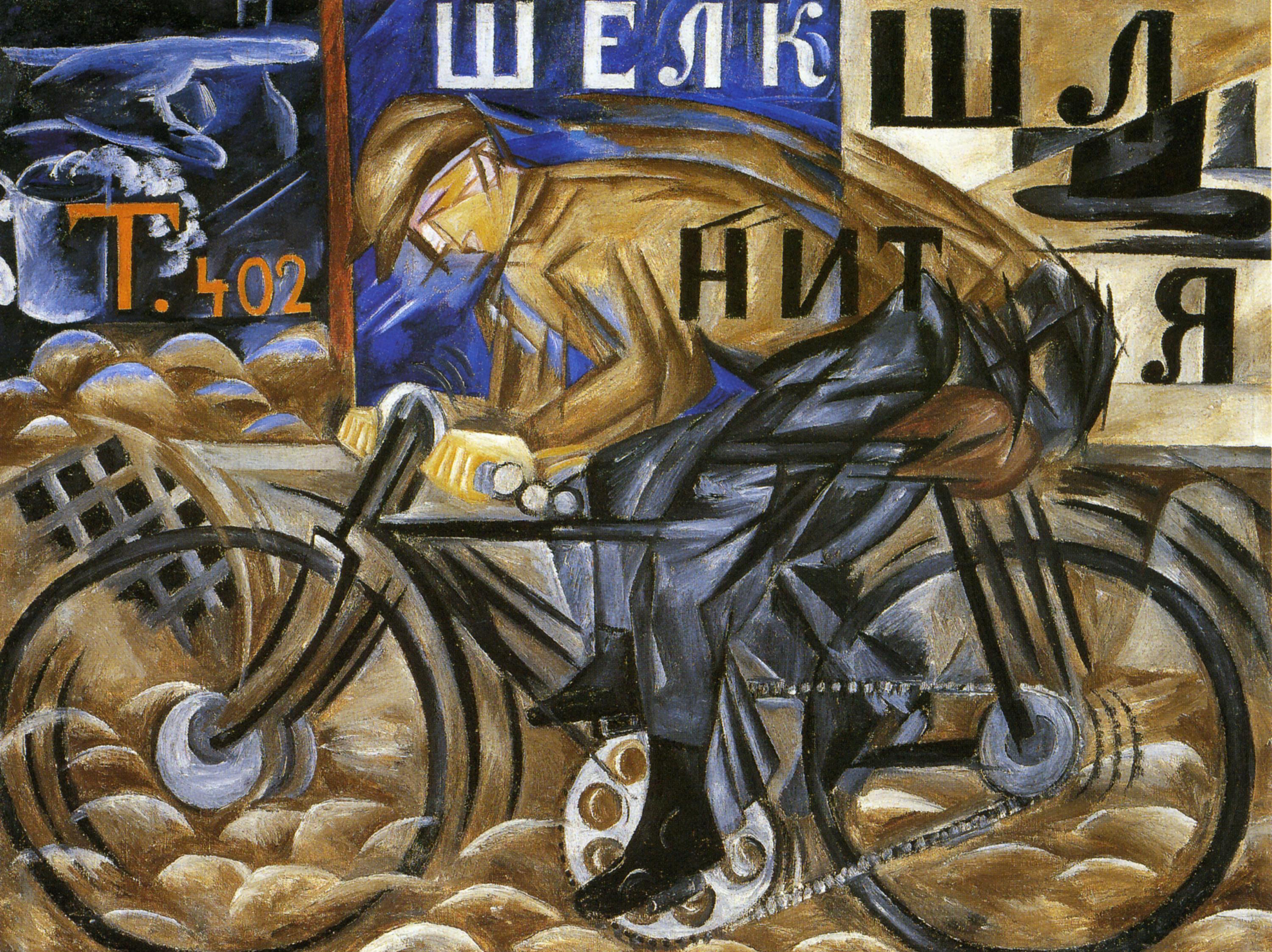
Natalia Goncharova, Cyclist (1913), oil on canvas, 78×105 cm, State Russian Museum

Cubo-Futurism (Russian: кубофутуризм, romanized: kubofuturizm) was an art movement, developed within Russian Futurism, that arose in early 20th-century Russia, defined by its amalgamation of the artistic elements found in Italian Futurism and French Analytical Cubism. Cubo-Futurism was the main school of painting and sculpture practiced by the Russian Futurists. In 1913, the term "Cubo-Futurism" first came to describe works from members of the poetry group "Hylaeans", as they moved away from poetic Symbolism towards Futurism and zaum, the experimental "visual and sound poetry of Kruchenykh and Khlebninkov". Later in the same year the concept and style of "Cubo-Futurism" became synonymous with the works of artists within Russian post-revolutionary avant-garde circles as they interrogated non-representational art through the fragmentation and displacement of traditional forms, lines, viewpoints, colours, and textures within their pieces. The impact of Cubo-Futurism was then felt within performance art societies, with Cubo-Futurist painters and poets collaborating on theatre, cinema, and ballet pieces that aimed to break theatre conventions through the use of nonsensical zaum poetry, emphasis on improvisation, and the encouragement of audience participation (an example being the 1913 Futurist satirical tragedy Vladimir Mayakovsky).

The coexistence of these differing strands of artistic practice within Cubo-Futurism reflects an ideological preoccupation with collective renewal and deconstruction (a notion born of their post-revolutionary context) with each poet or painter free to create their own aesthetic consciousness based on the concept of revolution and collective action through reinterpretation of artistic and social traditions.

== Background ==
=== Importance of Post-Revolutionary context ===
In the context of late Tsarist Russia, society was deeply divided by social class. Russian industrialisation, development, economic growth, and urbanisation fell far behind other Western nations, with the country experiencing high levels of illiteracy, poor health care, and struggling with the limitations of little mass communication outside larger cities. Looking outward at the realities of those from neighbouring countries, artists who would later become members of the Cubo-Futurist movement noticed the impacts of the burgeoning Machine Age on everyday life, recognising the beauty, dynamism, and energy of the utilitarian machine aesthetic leading to a renewed interest in technological modernisation within art, poetry, and life. Active in Russian art circles, Ukrainian-born Aleksandr Shevchenko (1883–1948) echoed this sentiment when, in 1913, he stated, "the world has been transformed into a single, monstrous, fantastic, perpetually-moving machine, into a single huge non-animal automatic organism… [this] cannot help but be reflected in our thinking and in our spiritual life: in Art". The "cult of the machine" became an increasingly utopic concept within Cubo-Futurist circles, with artists perceiving the idyllic phenomenon of machine production as the foremost "proletariat creation" due to its ability to help construct an equitable, collective life for all people regardless of class. This ideological conception of utopic perfection through machinery significantly impacted the stylistic elements of the Cubo-Futurist movement, influencing artists to experiment with pure abstraction, geometric shapes, harsh lines and planes, and the deconstruction of organic forms into powerful structures infused with machine symbolism.

=== Impact of Russian art collectors ===
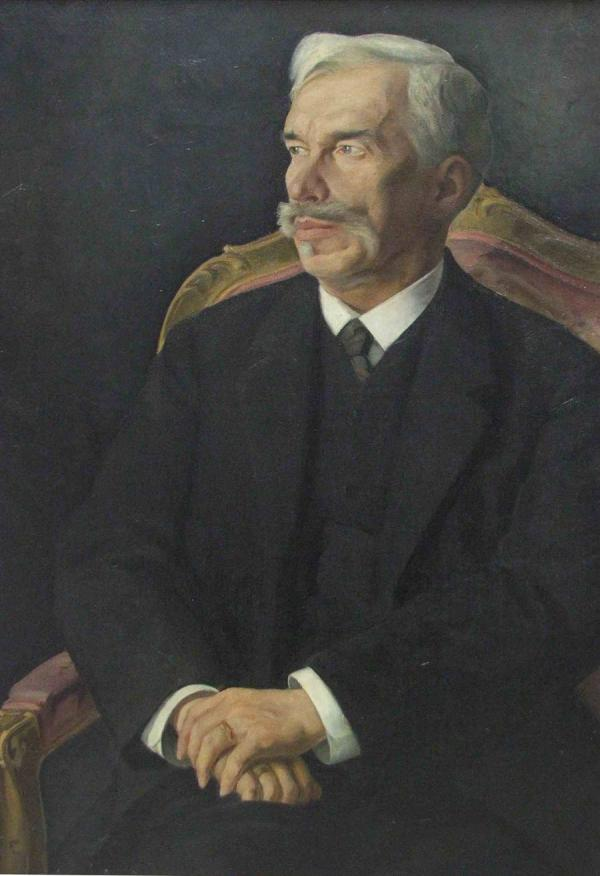
Sergey Schukin by Dm. Melnikov (1915)

At the top of early 20th century Russia’s deep social, political, and class divisions were a small group of elite aristocrats and businessmen. With considerable access to international art markets and dealers, they assembled significant number European masterpieces of the early 20th century for their own personal collections. Collectors and patrons, Sergei Shchukin (1854–1936) and Ivan Morozov (1871–1921), paid special attention to Impressionist, Post-Impressionist, Fauvist, Cubist, and Futurist art from all over Europe amassing a large selection of momentous works, and consequently introducing local Russian artists to art movements, techniques, and styles popular around the continent. Shchukin’s collection included a considerable number of Picassos, Matisses, Cezannes, Monets, and Gauguins, thus allowing artists in St. Petersburg and Moscow access to Cubist and Futurist artworks that would later influence the development of the Cubo-Futurist movement.

=== 'Hylea' and the impact of Marinetti's 'Futurist Manifesto ===
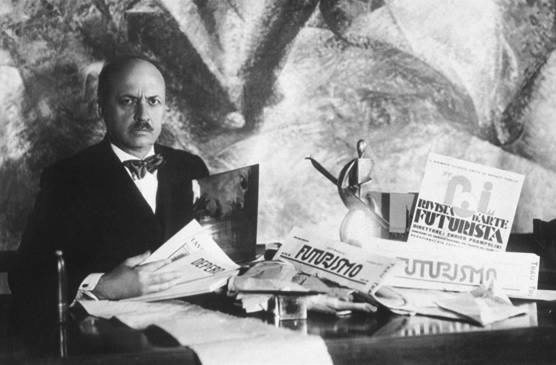
Filippo Tommaso Marinetti, author of the Manifesto of Futurism

While Cubo-Futurism was first named and identified in 1913, the movement can be traced back to a congregation of Russian artists who called themselves Soyuz Molodyozhi ('Union of Youth') in 1910. The group was brought together by the Ukrainian-born poet and painter David Burliuk (1882–1967) under the name budetlyane (a Russian interpretation of the western term "futurists"), inspired by Italian Filippo Tommaso Marinetti's (1876–1944) 1909 Futurist Manifesto. Marinetti's work espoused the need for creatives (e.g. artists and writers) to abandon the past by moving towards the utilisation of the aesthetic language of machinery, industrialisation, urban living, and utilitarian design. For Marinetti and those that followed him, the futurist movement stood for freedom, collectivity, perfection, and social rejuvenation. Influenced by the Futurist Manifesto, the aesthetics of dislocation and fragmentation became the vocabulary of the Cubo-Futurists in their attempt to interrogate the tireless and repetitive dynamism of technology, and highlight their fantasies of a utopic mechanical modernity. The Cubo-Futurists combined the modernist, cosmopolitan spirit of Marinetti's futurism with the aesthetic characteristics of analytical cubism (e.g. abstracted forms, flatness, fragmentation, geometric shapes, muted and dark colours, combination of various viewpoints) in order to create their own didactic art form designed to display the revolutionary focus of the artistic community.

== History ==
=== Origin of the term ===
The term 'Cubo-Futurism' first appeared in a lecture in 1913, originally to refer to the poets who belonged to David and Vladimir Burliuk's literary group, 'Hylaea', also spelt 'Guilée' and 'Gylea'. This term was coined by Korney Chukovsky (1882–1969), a Russian art critic, in reference to the work of Vladimir Mayakovsky, Aleksey Kruchonykh, Velimir Khlebnikov, Benedict Livshits, and Vasily Kamensky, members of the Hylaea group. It was only after aforementioned poets began to display shocking public behaviour (for example wearing absurd clothes), when the writers and the movement in general began to be called simply 'Russian Futurism'. As a result, 'Cubo-Futurism' then began to refer to the artists who were influenced by Cubism and Futurism, though both terms still remain interchangeable.

=== Development of the movement ===
The earliest appearances of the Cubo-Futurist art style can be found in the works of Natalia Goncharova, who, as early as 1909, applied Cubist and Futurist means of expression in her paintings.

Thanks to modern technology (transport and telegraphy, for example) and the artists' experience of other countries, the creatives in Russia knew much about the avant-garde events in Europe. Cubo-Futurism as an art style would begin to take its full form in the years 1912 to 1913, though the style of poetry ended when Russian Futurism itself also faded.

One of the first major painters to become a Cubo-Futurist would be Kazimir Malevich, who entered his Cubo-Futurist phase in 1912–13; he termed the works he exhibited at the 1912 'Donkey's Tail' and 1913 'Target' exhibitions as being 'Cubo-Futurist'. For Malevich, Cubo-Futurism would be especially important, because it symbolised the connection between the stillness of conventional Cubism, and the dynamism inherent in Futurism. Rather than simply following the example of painting industrial scenes, set by the Futurists in Italy, or of painting in fairly flat colours, set by the Cubists in France, he placed heavy rural Russian themes on his work; this therefore led to his paintings of traditional village life in a bright, juxtaposing avant-garde style. An example of his Cubo-Futurist work is The Knifegrinder, painted circa 1912–1913.

Natalia Goncharova officially entered her Futurist stage in around 1912 to 1913; soon, Cubo-Futurist influences became apparent in her work. This was not, for her, a dramatic change in her previous style of painting. In 1913, an exhibition of her latest work was held at a Russian art gallery, which received a massive variety of responses. Mikhail Larionov followed suit in the latest avant-garde trend, by publishing two manifestos on his and Goncharova's new art movement, Rayonism, which was inspired by Cubo-Futurism.

Other Cubo-Futurist artists emerged, for example Aleksandra Ekster, who was involved in Russian Futurist stage design, and Lyubov Popova, who had learned of Cubism during her 1912 stay in Paris, and painted in the Cubo-Futurist style in the years 1913 to 1914. The movement in Russia was notable for having a large percentage of female painters, in contrast to the movement in Italy.

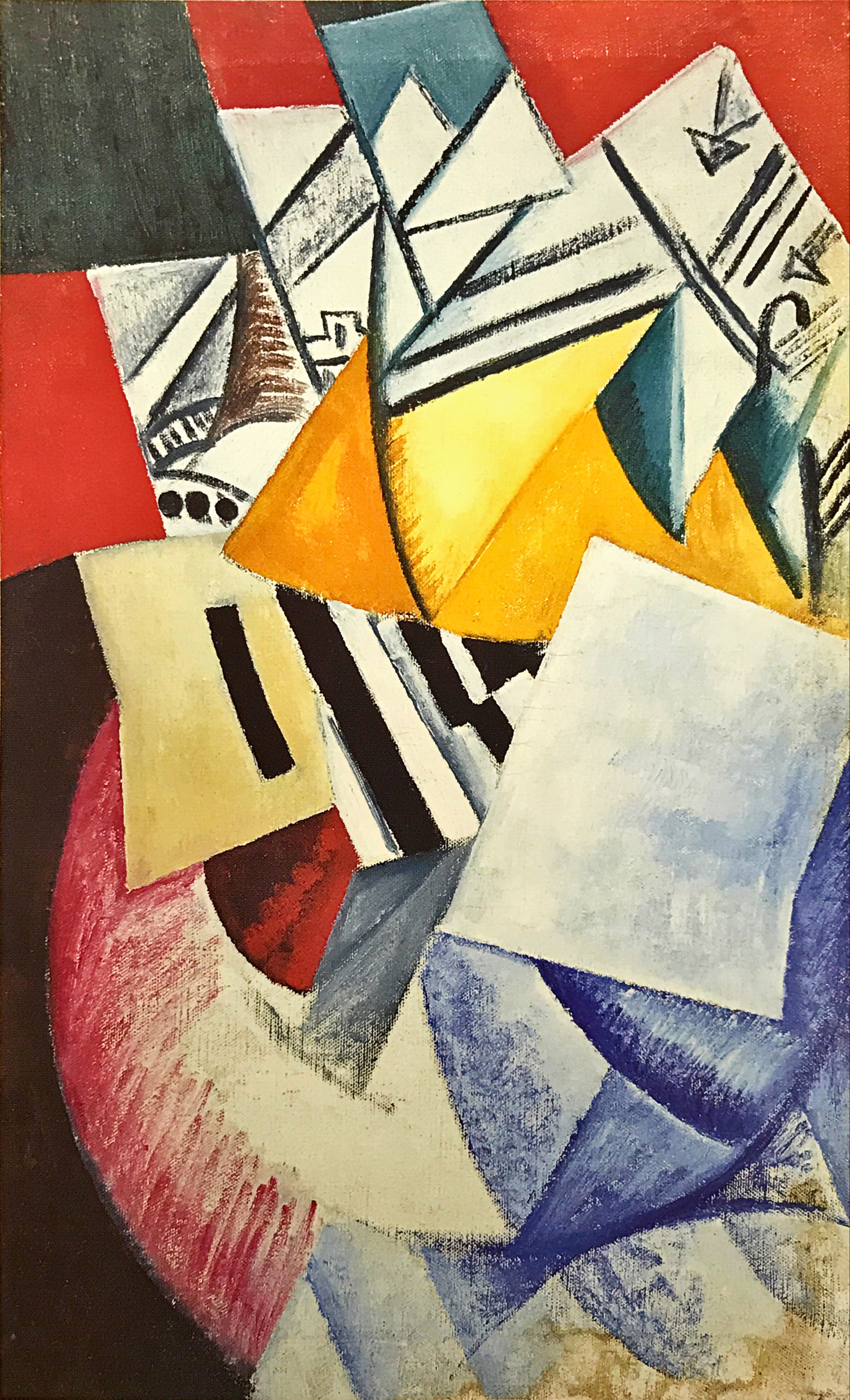
Composition with Cards (1915) by Olga Rozanova

The Cubo-Futurists – both poets and artists – were also notable for their curious activities, both public and artistic: Mayakovsky wore a bright yellow jacket, Ilia Zdanevich ("Iliazd") and Burliuk painted on their faces, and some of the painters attached objects upon their canvases, in such manners that predated the Dada avant-garde movement based in Zurich, Berlin, and Paris, which would begin a few years later.

In 1913, the opera Victory over the Sun – prologue by Khlebnikov, libretti by Kruchenykh, and music by Mikhail Matyushin – was completed. The costume and set designer was Malevich; the opera has since become notable for starring the first appearance of his influential painting Black Square, as part of a design for a stage curtain. The next year, a Russian Futurist book was published: Tango with Cows, written by aviator-poet Vasily Kamensky and illustrated by the Burliuk brothers.

By 1914, the Russian Futurists (many of them Cubo-Futurist) developed a hostility to the Italians. When Marinetti went on a lecture tour of Russia in that year, he was met with general unfriendliness, contrary to the positive reception he had on his previous tour of 1910: Larionov had, for example, a serious argument with a pro-Marinetti cultural figure, the former wishing to greet him with rotten eggs and the latter with flowers, whereas the female Cubo-Futurist painters may have been put off by Marinetti's misogyny. The relations worsened to such an extent that Hylea began to fake the publication dates of their books, as though to state that they were earlier and more Futurist than their colleagues in Italy.

The Russian Futurists were also disgusted with the Ego-Futurists, a rival Russian literary association who had been formed in 1911 by the poet Igor Severyanin. This time, the negative feelings went both ways: Severyanin disapproved of the attitudes of the Cubo-Futurists, whilst they dismissed the Ego-Futurists as being immature, tasteless impostors.

=== End of Cubo-Futurism ===
By the year 1915, Cubism and Futurism both began to become exhausted for the painters; nevertheless, in 1915, the first all-Russian Futurist exhibition, called 'Tramway V', opened on March 3; organised by Ivan Puni, Vladimir Tatlin's works became the main focus, and the exhibition led to a succés de scandale. In 1916, another notable Cubo-Futurist book was published: Universal War, by Aleksei Kruchenykh, perhaps in collaboration with his wife Olga Rozanova.

Cubo-Futurism can be said to have ended with the 0,10 Exhibition of 1915–1916, also organised by Puni, and fuelled by the rivalry between Malevich and Tatlin; afterwards, most of the participants of Cubo-Futurism began to direct their energies to other styles of writing or painting, for example Malevich's new art movement Suprematism, which officially began at the 0,10 Exhibition, or with Constructivism.

According to the Italian Futurist painter Gino Severini, who had met and heard first-hand accounts from the Russian Futurist painters Larionov, Puni and Kseniya Boguslavskaya, the movement finished in 1916, though, according to the Encyclopædia Britannica, the style continued to be in use until roughly 1919.

== Art ==
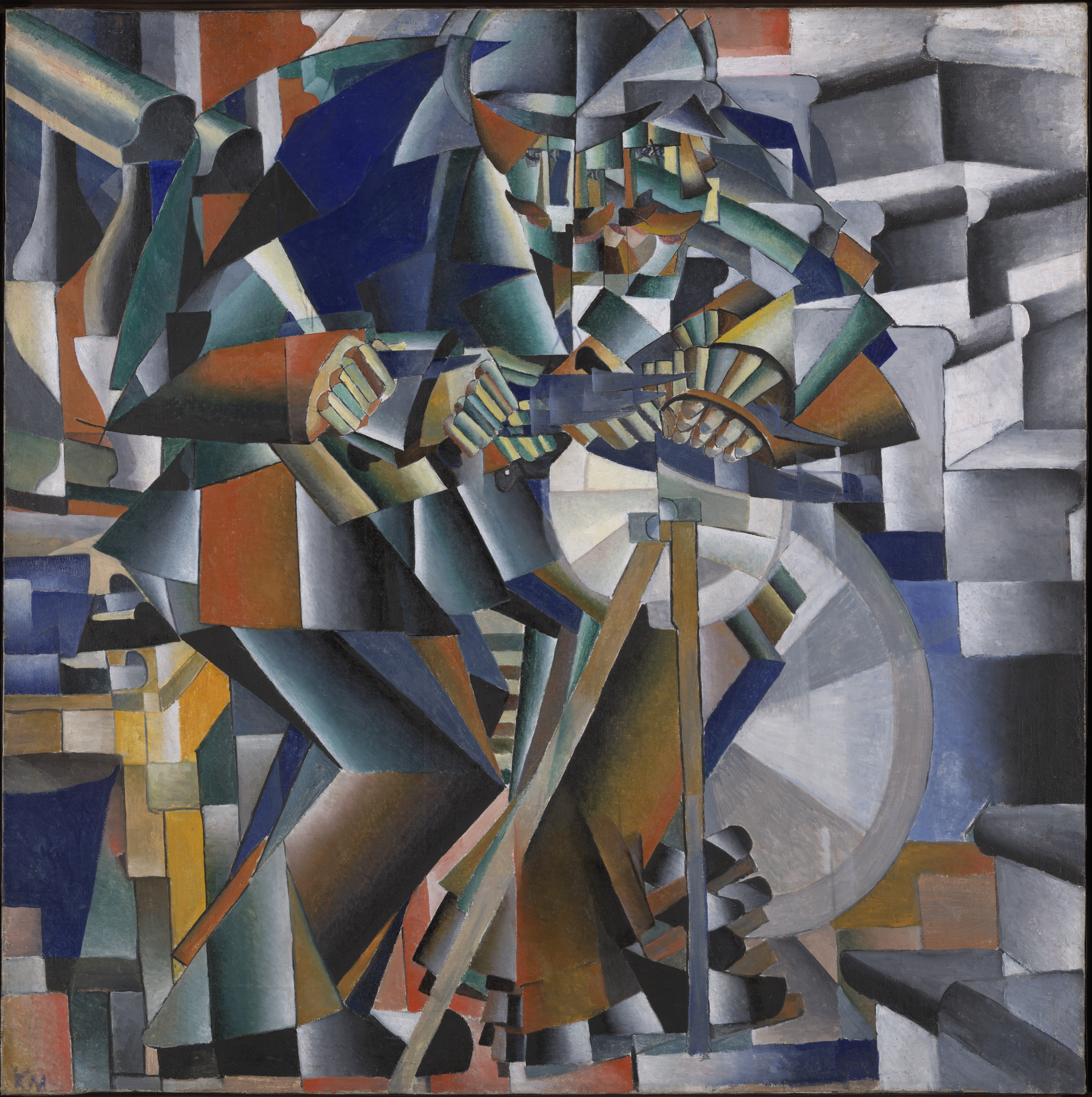
Kazimir Malevich, The Knife Grinder (Principle of Glittering) (1912–13), oil on canvas, 79.534 cm × 79.534 cm, Yale University Art Gallery

For Cubo-Futurist artists, this movement represented a shift in stylistic values from a perception of painting as a reflection of their current reality into a portrayal of idealism through depictions of a perfect future defined by equality and an organised collective consciousness.

One such example would be Kazimir Malevich's 1912–13 The Knife Grinder (The Glittering Edge). The flickering of reflective metallic colours creates a dynamic representation of motion and energy, depicting the "mechanical vibration and dynamic rhythm" of modernisation through industrialisation and mechanical harmony. The knife grinder himself is central to the composition, camouflaged within the dense abstracted geometric shapes that surround and encompass him, invoking the idea that the man has fused into the mechanical perfection of a giant organised system. To Malevich and other artists of the Cubo-Futurist movement, works like this acted as a social metaphor highlighting the process of transformation, revolution, social rebuilding, and proletariat collectivism they wished to see in their society's future. Complex abstracted geometric shapes and representations of perfected mechanical society's highlights the revolutionary nature of their work as, "only futurist art is constructed on collective principles… Only futurist art is, at the present time, 'the art of the proletariat'", as painter and sculptor Nathan Altman (1889–1970) once stated.

Cubo-Futurist artists are unique in their independence and autonomy from other members of the group. Non-representational artists experimenting with Cubo-Futurism – such as Kandinsky, Larionov, Malevich, and Tatlin – adopted the distinctive ideals and theoretical background of the movement but followed their own aesthetic path, thus depicting the freedom these artists were given to express their own perceptions of a modernised world.

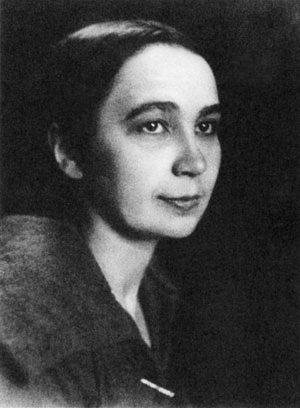
Picture of Natalia Goncharova, one of the members of the Cubo-Futurist movement.

=== Artists ===
The following artists have been associated with Cubo-Futurism:

- Alexander Archipenko
- Wladimir Baranoff-Rossine
- Alexander Bogomazov
- David Burliuk
- Wladimir Burliuk
- Aleksandra Ekster
- Natalia Goncharova
- Ivan Kliun
- Mikhail Larionov
- Lyubov Popova
- Olga Rozanov
- Sonia Terk
- Vasyl Yermylov
- Alberto Magnelli
- Vadym Meller
- Aristarkh Lentulov

=== Sculpture ===
Sculpture was a smaller subsect of the Cubo-Futurist movement. Influenced by the work of Italian futurist sculptor and painter Umberto Boccioni, and Pablo Picasso's cubist sculptures, Russian artists began experimenting with the combination of the two styles. Artists who experimented with Cubist and Futurist (or a combination of both) styles within their sculptures all expressed a dislike of traditional, classical artistic traditions, thus highlighting the characteristically Cubo-Futurist interest in transformation, innovation, and rejuvenation.

Cubo-Futurist sculptors included Joseph Chaikov, Boris Korolev and Vera Mukhina, all of whom taught at the Soviet state art school in Moscow, Vkhutemas.

== Literature ==
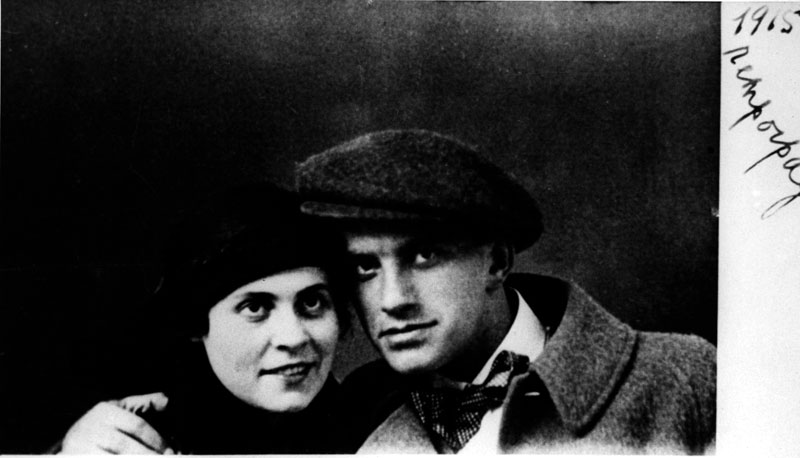
Vladimir Mayakovsky and his muse, Lilya Brik.

=== Poetry ===
Poets that experimented with Cubo-Futurist ideals pressed the importance of deconstructing the rules and meaning of poetry, systematically attacking the previously popular Russian classical and symbolist poets due to their propensity to examine metaphysical, esoteric ideas that did not resonate with the common populace. Cubo-Futurist artists had a passion for the democratisation of poetry through the use of chaotic, common language (and concepts) that allowed for freedom of expression and interpretation by the average person. Like artists of the same movement, these poets were interested in creating "totally new words and a new way of combining them", transforming and recreating poetry into a literary form that depicted their ideas of a modernised future. Poets of the Cubo-Futurist movement saw writing as a "laboratory or workshop" to renew language and literature, dissecting words and generating neologisms in order to shift contemporary understandings of poetry in order to display their interest in revolution and modernity. This practice is known as "transrational poetry" (or zaum). The purity and dynamism artists of this movement found in mechanisation and technology, literary Cubo-Futurists found in transrational poetry, with this poetic experimentation later developing to involve the deconstruction of language to onomatopoeic forms. One such example of this is Velimir Khlebnikov's sound-paintings in his play Zangezi. Poets of this movement also utilised unorthodox methods during their public poetry recitals, such as painted faces, public clowning, and extravagant clothing in order to gather attention to their work, and highlight their futuristic experimentation.

=== Theatre ===
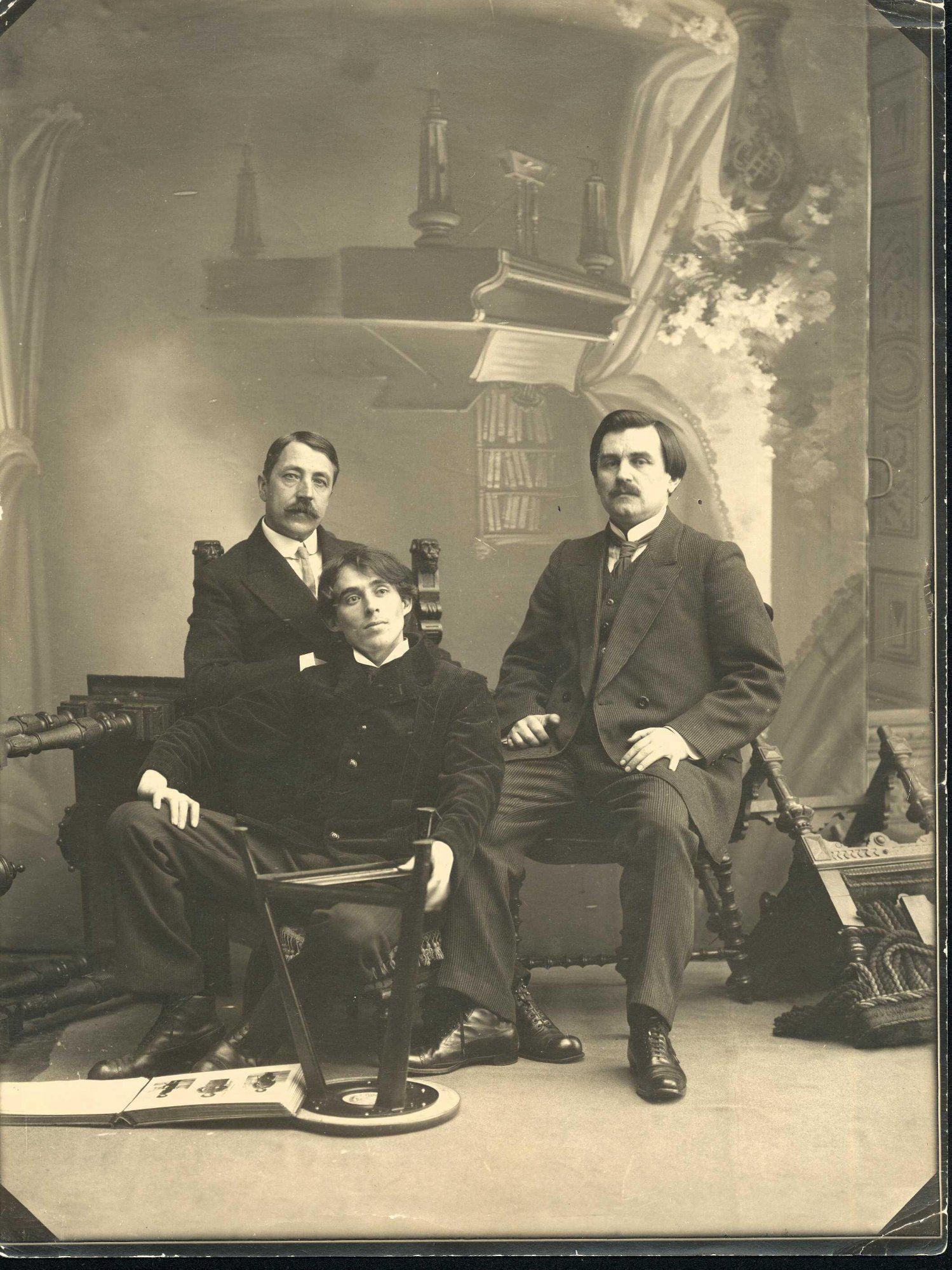
Some of the attendees of the Pervyi vserossiiskii sjezd Baiachei Budushchego (poetov futuristov) (First All-Russian Congress of Bards of the Future [The Futurist Poets]) – Mikhail Matyushin, Kazimir Malevich, and Aleksei Kruchenikh.

Introduction of Cubo-Futurist theories and ideologies into the realm of theatre production came with widespread scandal among those within the turn-of-the-century Russian society. Similar to those that engaged with Cubo-Futurism within the art world, individuals within the theatre community utilised the movement's characteristic ideology of cultural renewal, transformation, and revolution within their works, expanding futurism from the literary and artistic realm and into theatre. In July 1913, a collection of poets and artists within the Cubo-Futurist movement came together for a meeting entitled Pervyi vserossiiskii sezd Baiachei Budushchego (poetov futuristov) (First-All Russian Congress of Bards of the Future [The Futurist Poets]), establishing that the group would create a "new 'Futurian' theatre" that would be run by their own collective and "transform Russian theatre" into a modern art form. The Cubo-Futurists employed a more aggressive style within their performances, making use of arte-azione's (art-in-action) playfulness, provocative or unintelligible language, improvisation, and unpredictability. As stated by Roman Jakobson (1896–1982): "The evenings of the Futurists brought… the public… The public's reaction was various: many came for the scandal, but a broad segment of the student public awaited the new art, wanted the new world".

== Effects of Cubo-Futurism ==
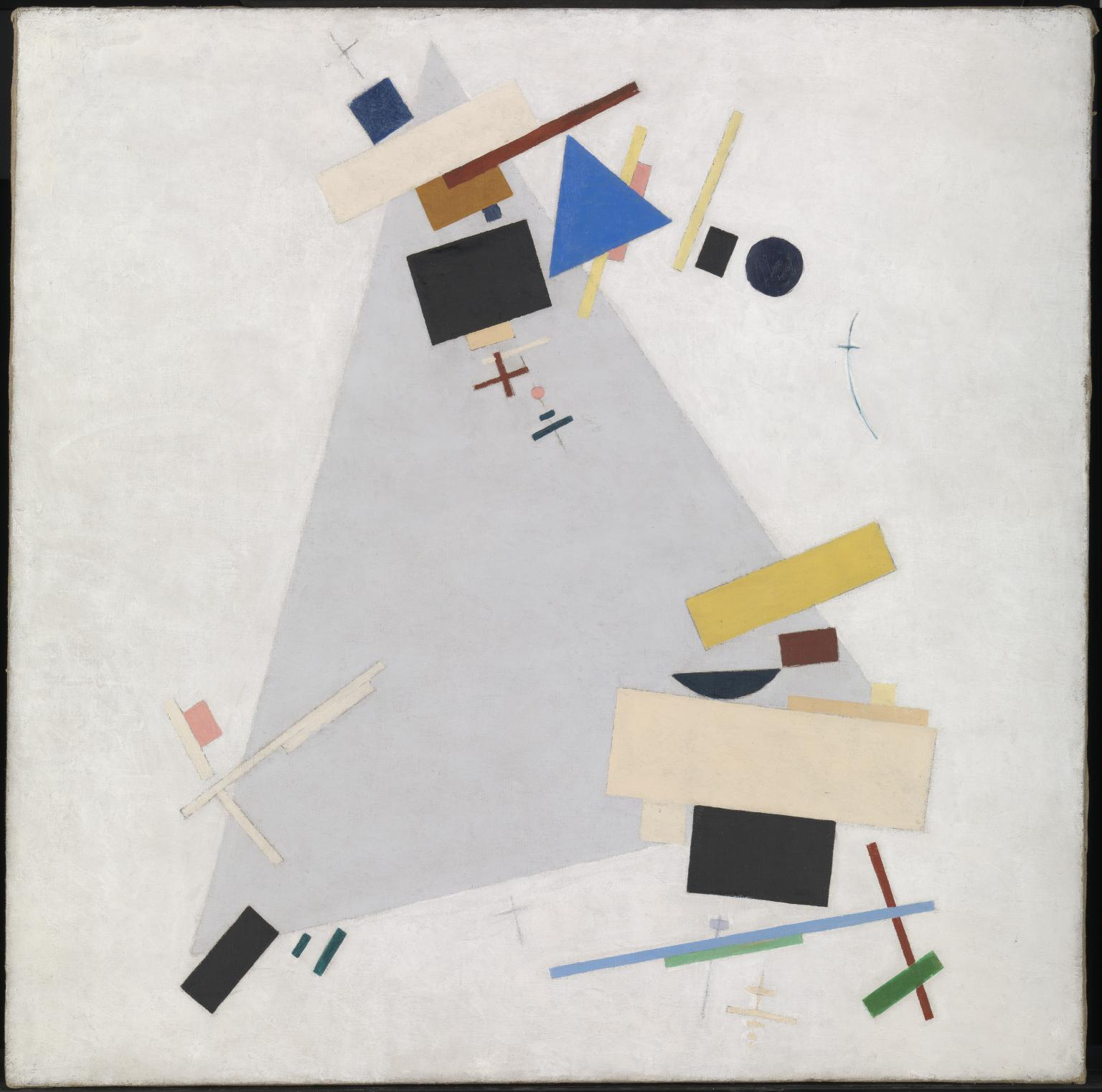
Example of Malevich's suprematist works. Kazimir Malevich, Dynamic Suprematism (1916), oil on canvas, 80.2 x 80.3 cm, Tate Gallery

Cubo-Futurism was incredibly significant in the development of art styles like Rayonism, Suprematism, and Constructivism, with the movement acting as a transitionary phase between objective, figurative works and radical non-objective, non-representational abstract art. Cubo-Futurism gave artists the freedom to engage with the limitations of representation and subjectivity, and experiment with use geometric shapes and fragmented forms in order to convey a movement and dynamism that reflected their attempts to reconstruct understandings of their world and their art.

Cubo-Futurism acted as the jumping point for artists Mikhail Larionov (1881–1964) and Natalia Goncharova to develop Rayism (also called Rayonism), one of the first non-objective Russian artistic styles.

It was either Rayism or, once more, Cubism and Futurism (or a mixture of all three) which then later influenced Kazimir Malevich to create Suprematism, an art mode that is now considered one of the most significant modern art movements of the 20th century.

== Gallery ==
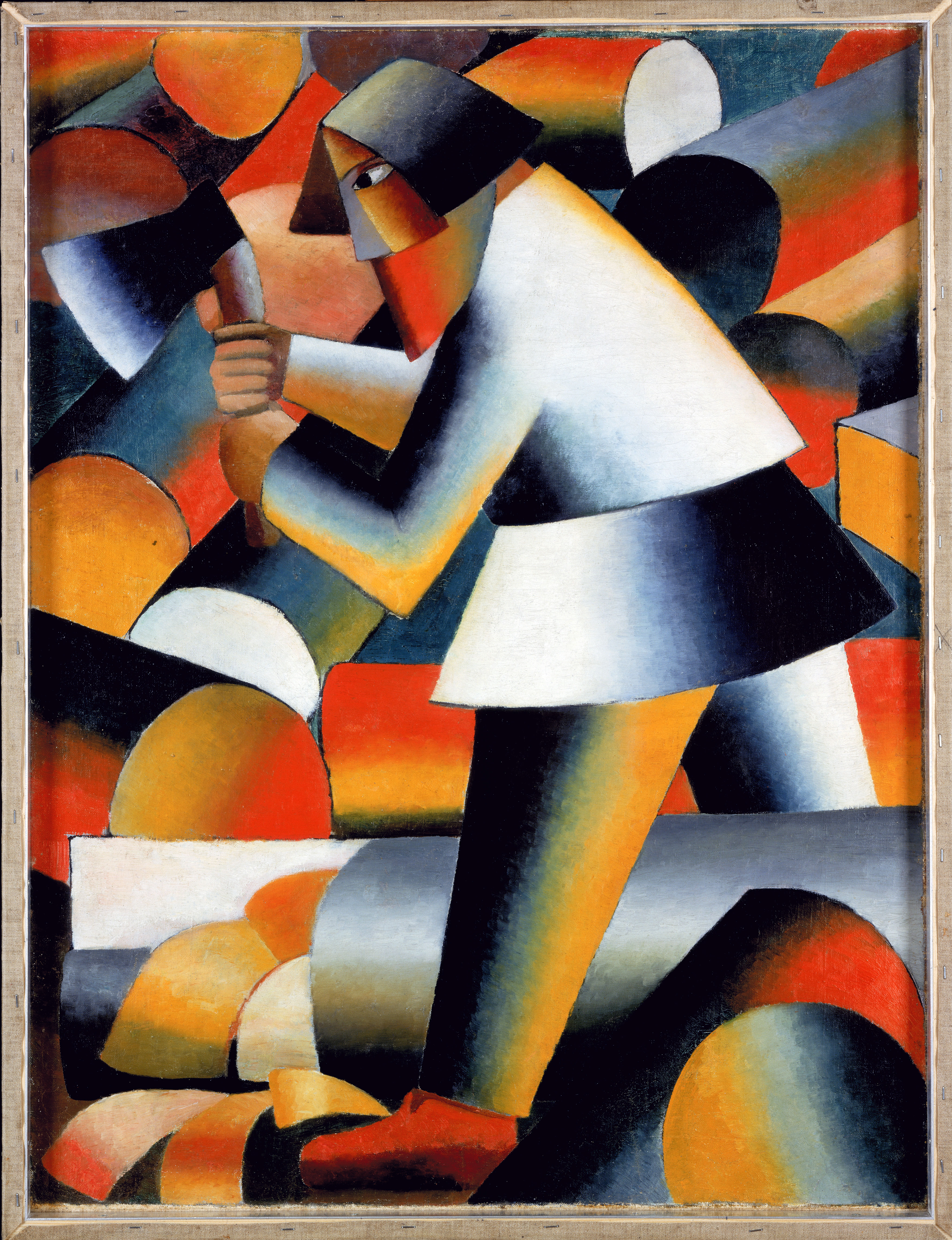
Woodcutter (1912) by Kazimir Malevich

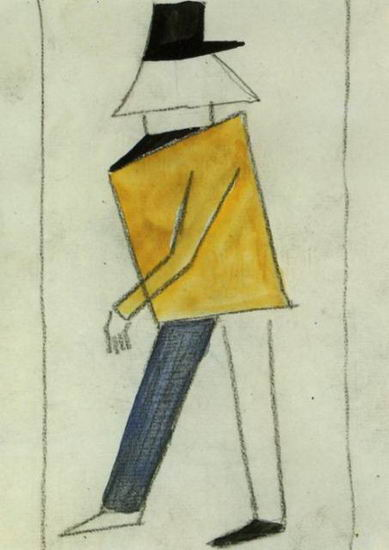
Costume design (c. 1910-1913) by Kazimir Malevich for Victory over the Sun

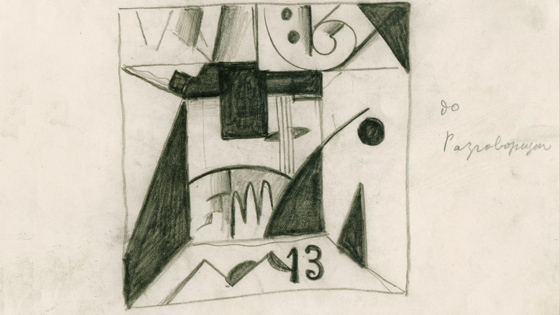
Backdrop design (c. 1910-1913) by Kazimir Malevich for Victory over the Sun

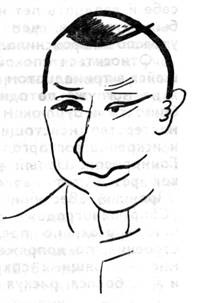
Vladimir Burliuk (from Trebnik Troikh, 1913) by David Burliuk

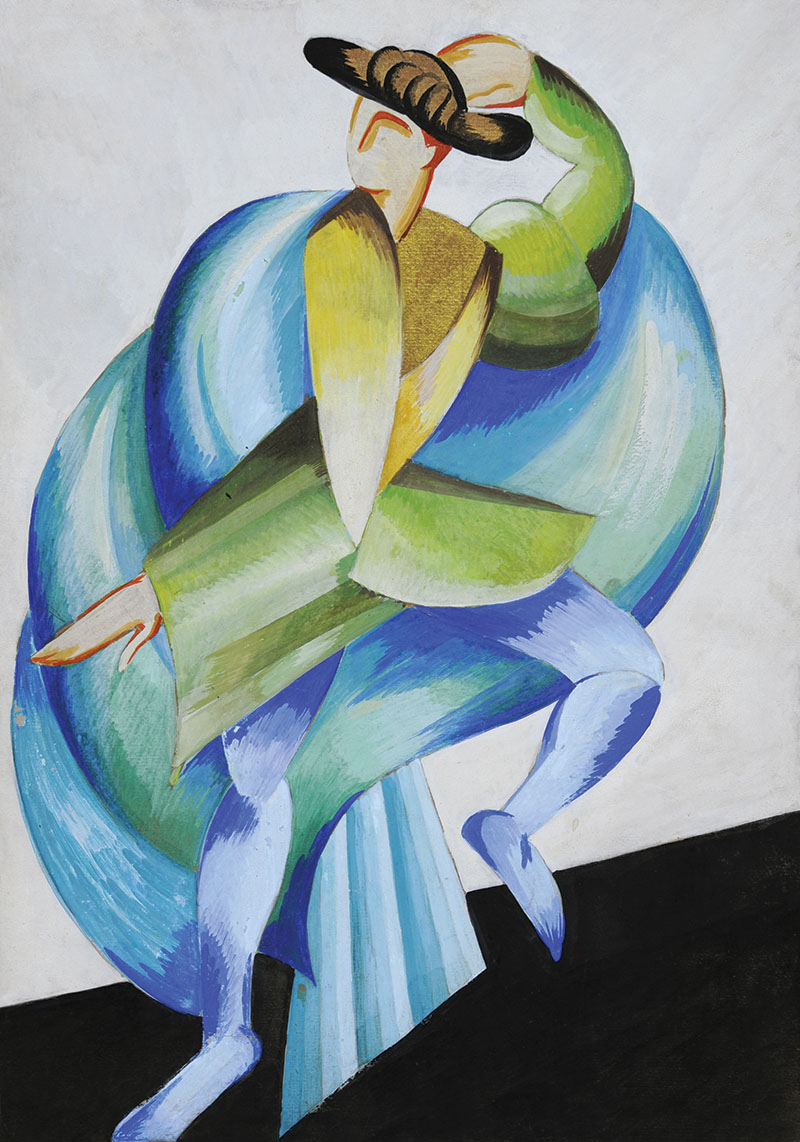
Cavalier (1913) by Alexandra Exter

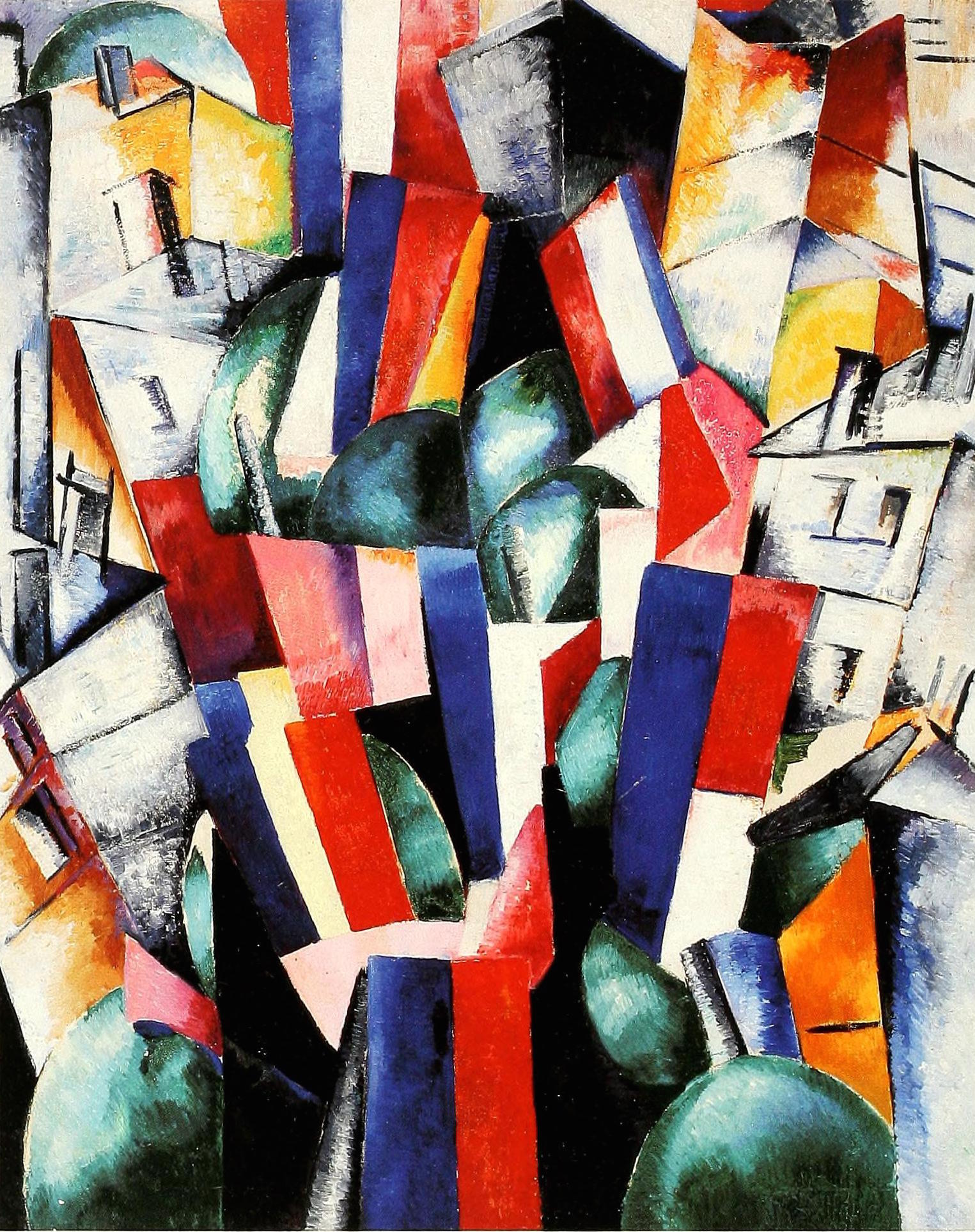
City (1913) by Alexandra Exter

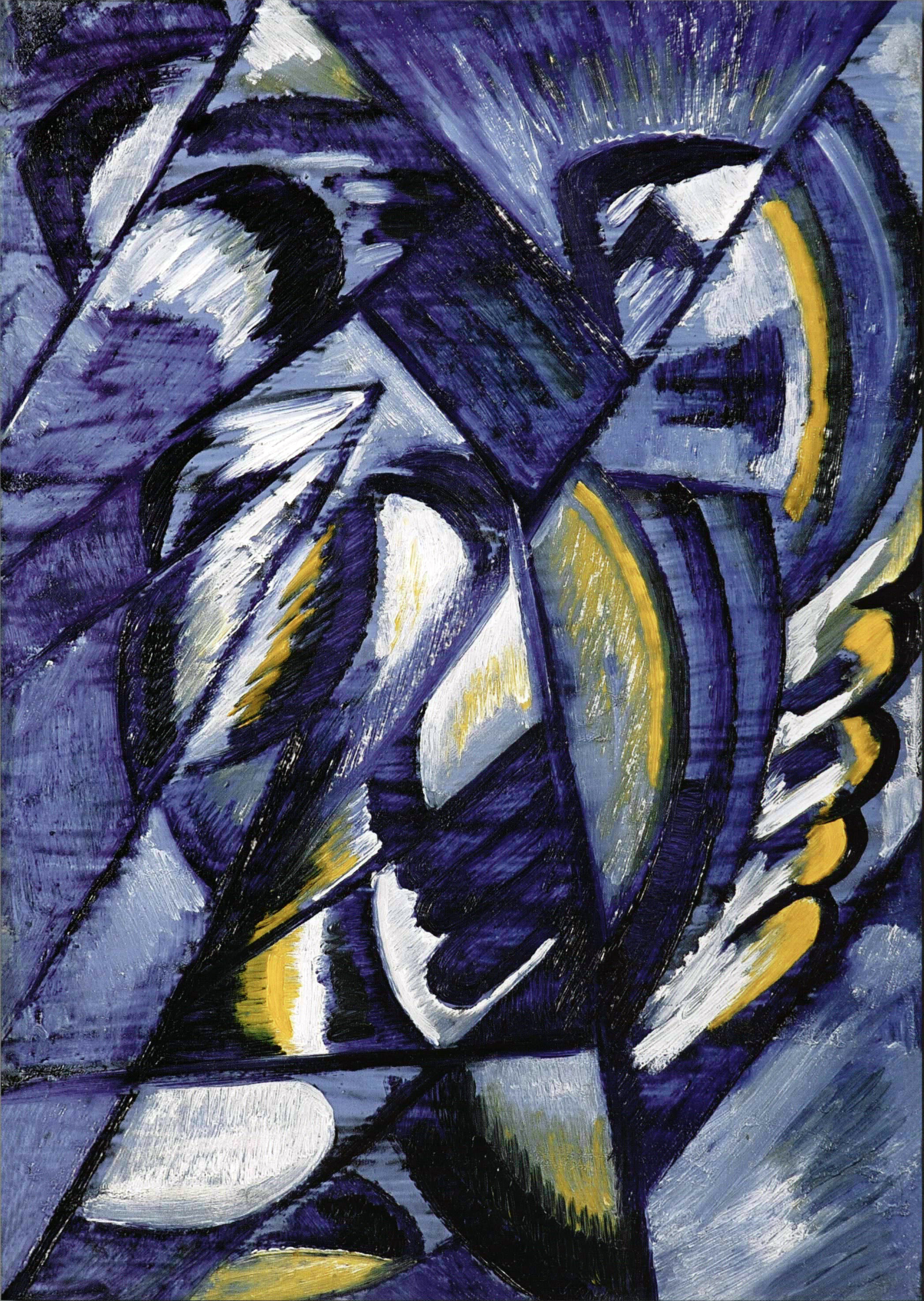
Blue on Tin (1913) by Olga Rozanova

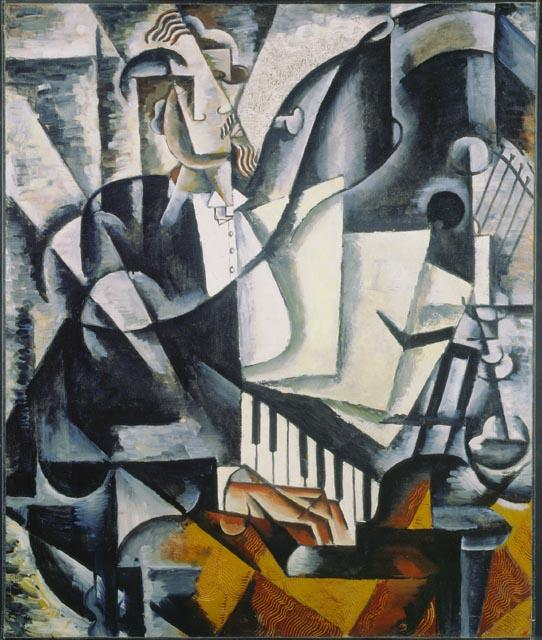
The Pianist (1914) by Lyubov Popova

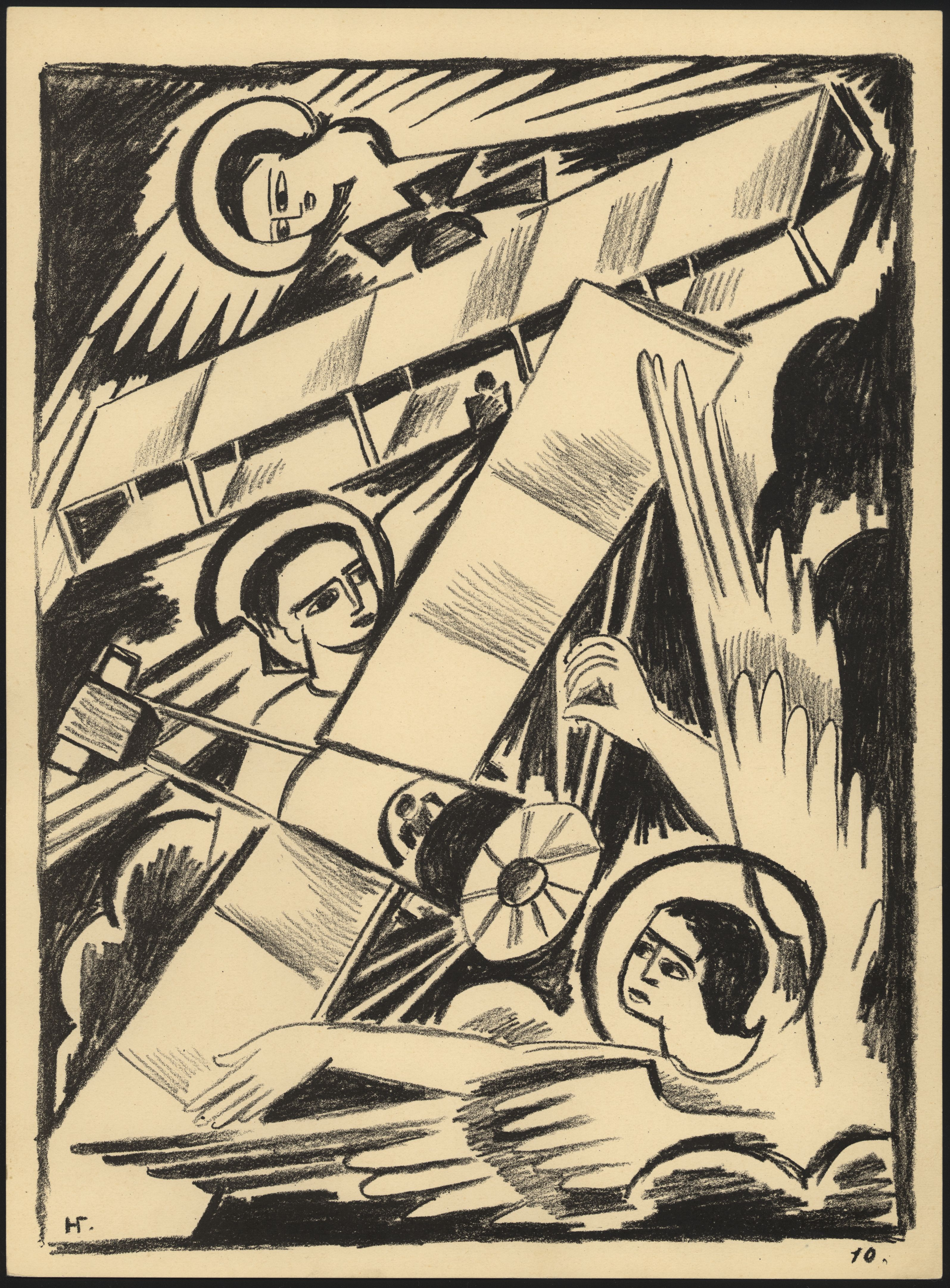
Angels and Aeroplanes (from Mystical Images of War, 1914) by Natalia Goncharova

The poem Constantinople from Tango with Cows (illustrated by David and Vladimir Burliuk) by Vasily Kamensky, 1914

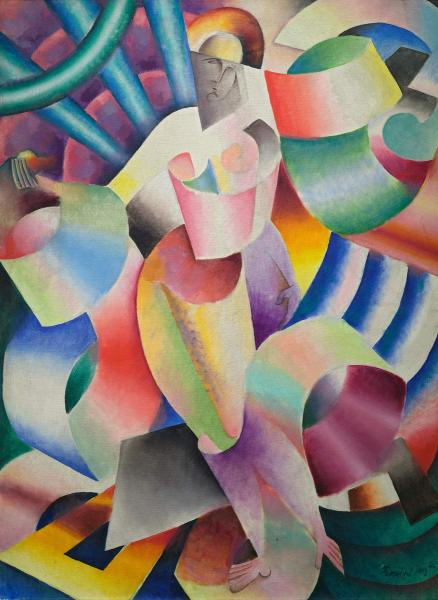
Fyodor Christiania (1915) by Vladimir Baranov-Rossine

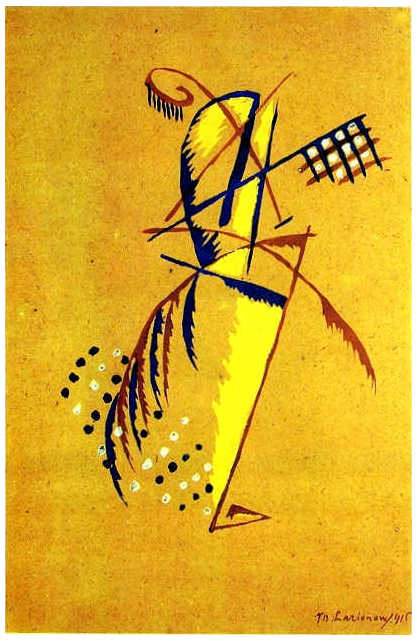
Dancer in Motion (1915) by Mikhail Larionov

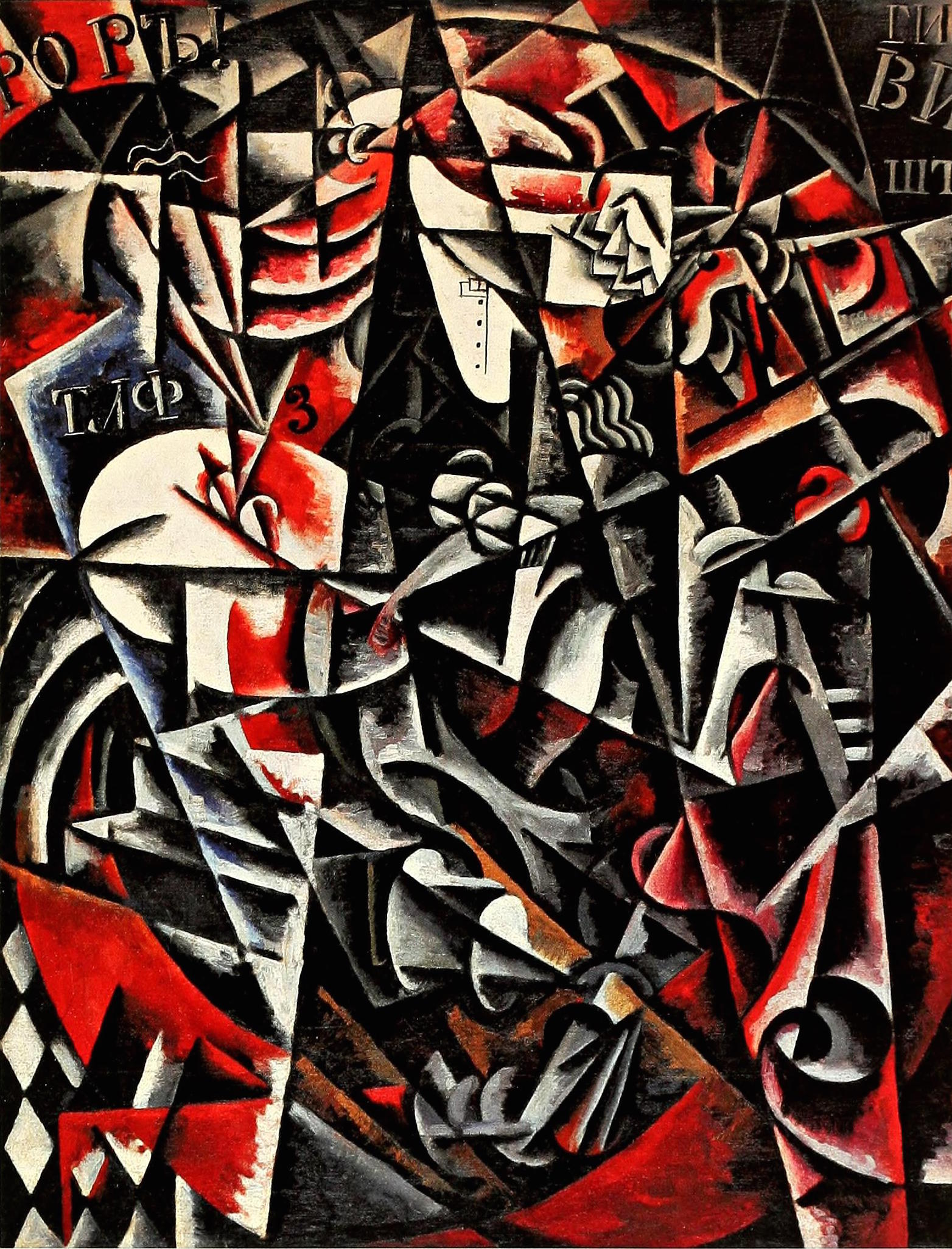
Travelling Woman (1915) by Lyubov Popova

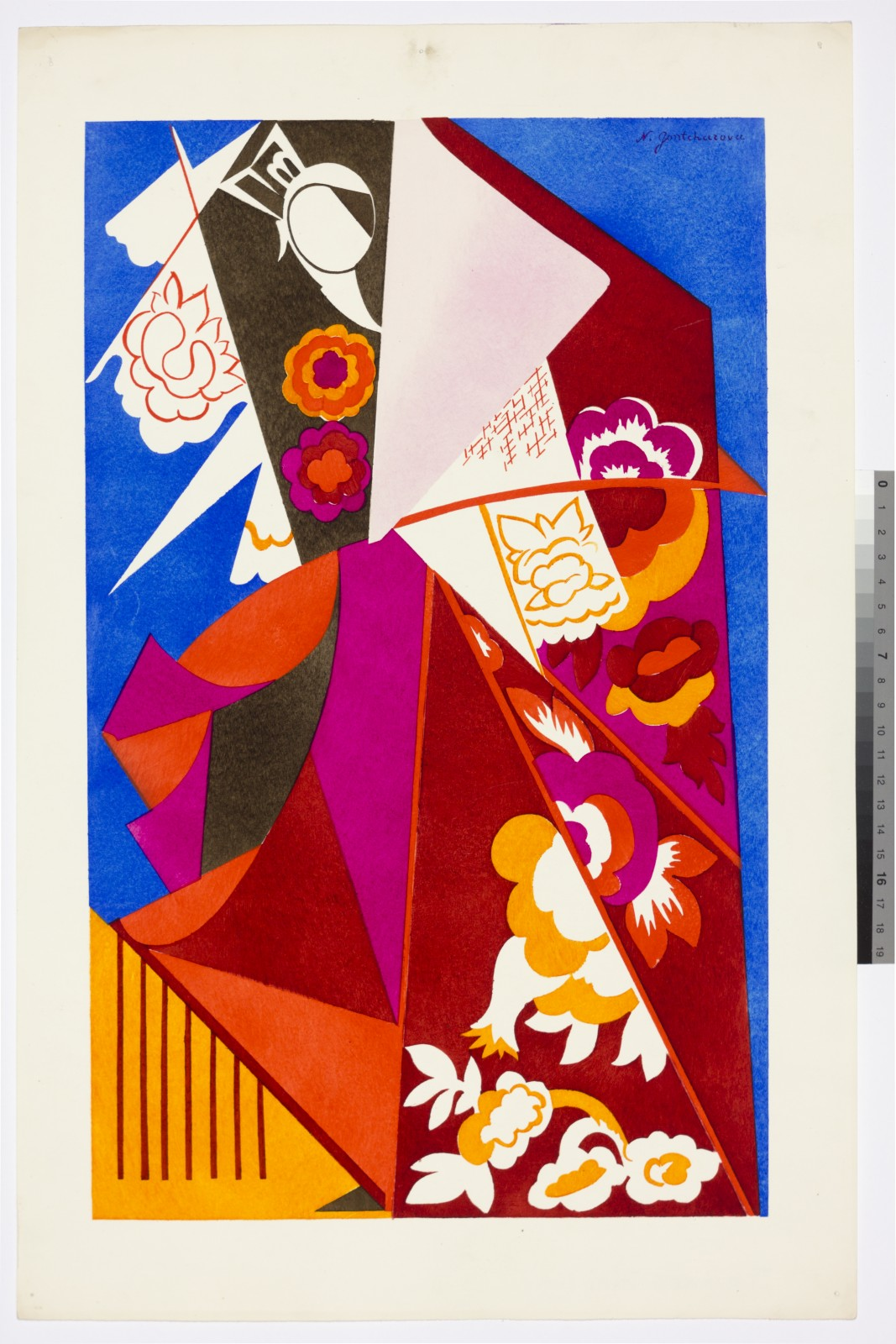
Construction with Flowers (1916) by Natalia Goncharova

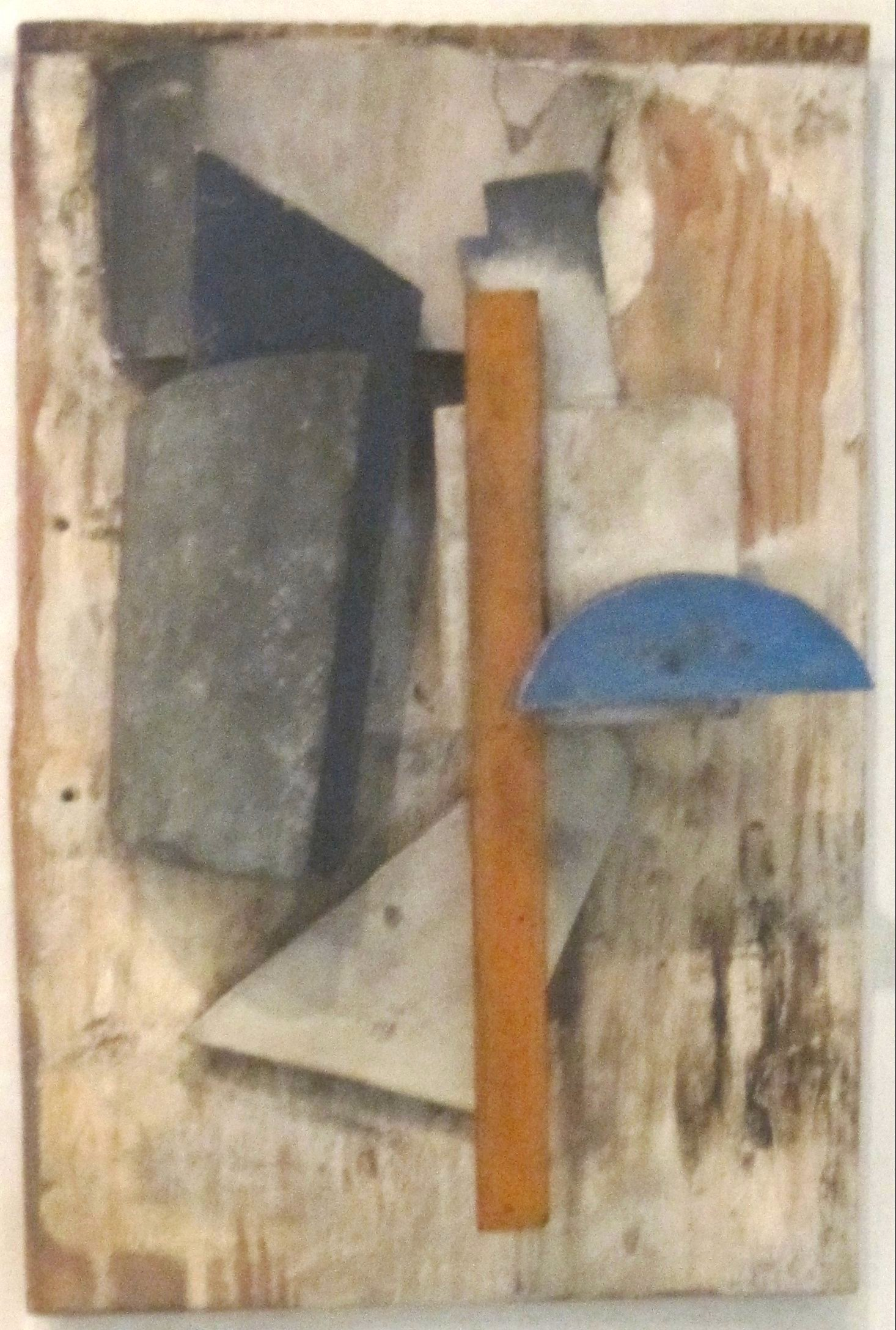
Relief (c. 1915-1916) by Ivan Puni

== See also ==
- Futurism
- Cubism
- Russian Futurism
- Rayonism
- Vorticism
- Natalia Goncharova
- Mikhail Larionov
- Modern art (disambiguation) – list of articles associated with the title 'Modern art'
- Art period
