= Benedikt Livshits =

Russian poet, writer and translator (1886–1938)

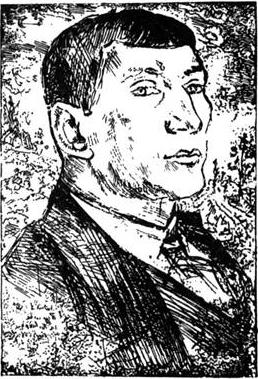
Portrait by David Burliuk, 1911

Benedikt Konstantinovich Livshits (Russian: Бенеди́кт Константи́нович Ли́вшиц; 6 January 1887 [O.S. 24 December 1886] – 21 September 1938) was a Russian poet and writer of the Silver Age of Russian Poetry and a French–Russian poetry translator. He is best remembered as the author of The One and a Half-Eyed Archer (1933), memoirs on Russian avant-garde that were translated to multiple languages.

== Life and career ==
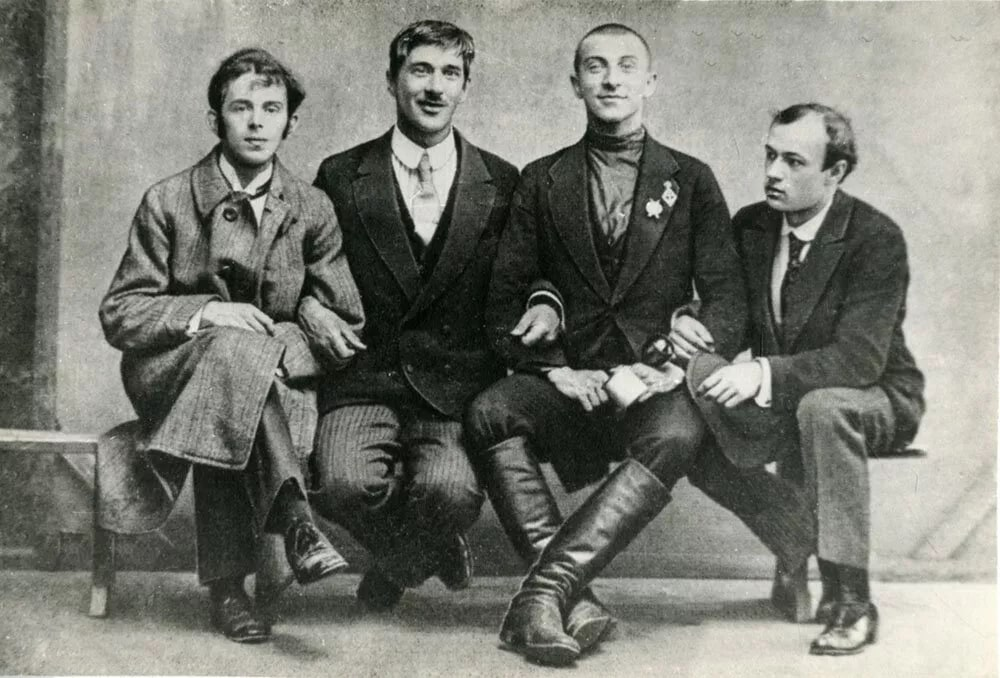
Livshits (second from right) with friends: Osip Mandelstam, Korney Chukovsky, and Yury Annenkov. Photo 1914

Livshits was born to an assimilated Jewish family in Odessa. He studied law at Novorossia University and then moved to Kiev University, where he graduated in 1912. He was conscripted to the Russian army and served in the 88th Infantry Regiment near Novgorod. In 1914, shortly after he converted to Orthodox Christianity, Lifshits again served in the infantry during World War I, where he was wounded and awarded the Cross of St. George.

In 1908, "The Exhibition of Modern Art" was staged in Kublin. This exhibition, which included the works of Georges Braque, Henri Matisse, and other European postimpressionist painters, made a profound impression on the young Livshits. His first poetry was published in the Anthology of Modern Poetry (Kiev) a year later. In 1910 he worked for Sergei Makovsky's symbolist art magazine Apollon. Lifshits also befriended Alexandra Ekster and other figures of Russian avant-garde in painting.

Together with Wladimir Burliuk, David Burliuk, Vladimir Mayakovsky, and Vasily Kamensky he was a member and co-founder of the major Russian Futurist group Hylaea (Russian Gilea). It is said to have been established after Livshits and the Burliuk brothers vacationed at the estate of Count Mordvinov in Chernianka. David Burliuk, Kamensky, and Livshits would form the nucleus of Cubo-Futurism, which became the most influential subdivision of Futurism. He briefly split from the movement in 1914, together with Velimir Khlebnikov, protesting from a nationalist standpoint against the visit of Filippo Marinetti to Saint Petersburg.

His own poetry, however, was only tangentially connected with the mainstream of Russian Futurism, let alone Cubo-Futurism, with its predominantly anti-aesthetic, primitivist, and urbanistic imagery and zaum language. Although Lifshits experimented with transferring the procedures of French Cubism and Surrealism into literature (his best-known Futurist text was the short prose People in Landscape, featuring syntactic dislocations and non-figurative imagery), the bulk of his poetry is euphonic, written in traditional Classicist verse and archaic diction, and employs complex metaphors with references to European poetry and Antiquity. Much of his work is underpinned by a shared philosophical conception of nature and culture, as well as a complex Eurasian view of Russia.

His four volumes of poetry are Marsyas' Flute (1911), Wolves' Sun (1914; the title quotes Tristan Corbière), Swamp Medusa (a book on Saint Petersburg, partly published in 1919 under the title From Marshy Bogs), and Patmos (1926). In 1928 a book Noon at Crotone appeared, which brought together much of his earlier work. In the 1930s, Lifshits wrote many poems on Georgian themes; he visited Georgia many times, befriended Georgian poets whose verse he also translated, learned the language, and planned to publish a fifth collection, Kartvelian Odes. It did not appear, however, until his posthumous rehabilitation in 1964, in Tbilisi.

In 1933 Lifshits published a book of memoirs, The One and a Half-Eyed Archer, which is considered one of the best histories of Russian Futurism. In this book, Lifshits notably coined "Amazons" as a sobriquet of female avant-garde painters, Ekster, Natalia Goncharova, and Olga Rozanova. This work also detailed the cultural discomfort of a fully assimilated Jewish artist in Russia. In 1934, a large book of translations from French poetry, From Romantics to Surrealism appeared. An analysis of his translation works noted his tendency to uphold the structure of the material being translated as a whole and to maintain close proximity to the original.

In 1937, Livshits became a victim of Joseph Stalin's Great Purge. He was arrested in October 1937 and summarily executed with other Leningrad writers on 21 September 1938 as an "enemy of the people", after ostensibly admitting, under torture, to having planned terrorist acts with the Trotskyite Victor Serge and naming dozens of literary figures as his accomplices. His dossier was falsified to state that he died of heart failure on 15 May 1939. His large archive and library was destroyed by NKVD. Lifshits' translations were re-published since 1960s, and memoirs and original poetry since 1989.

Lifshits was married twice: first to Vera Arngold-Zhukova, an actress and cousin of Andrey Bely, and then to Ekaterina Skachkova, a ballerina and later his fellow translator from French. He had two sons, one from each marriage, neither of whom survived past their teens; his younger son, Kirill, was killed in 1942 in the Battle of Stalingrad. Lifshits’s widow, Ekaterina, was also imprisoned in the 1940s and later struggled for his rehabilitation and for the publication of his works. Her memoirs and letters were collected in 2019.

== Literary works ==
- The Flute of Marsias (1911, printing was destroyed by government censorship).
- Sun of wolves (Volch'e solntse), 1914.
- The One and a Half-eyed Archer (Polutoraglazyj strelets), 1933 – memoirs about the Futurist movement.
