= Periods in Western art history =

List of western art periods

This is a chronological list of periods in Western art history. An art period is a phase in the development of the work of an artist, groups of artists or art movement.

== Ancient Classical art ==
- Minoan art
- Aegean art
- Ancient Greek art
- Roman art

== Medieval art ==
- Early Christian – 260 – 525
- Migration Period – 300 – 900
- Anglo-Saxon – 400 – 1066
- Visigothic – 415 – 711
- Pre-Romanesque – 500 – 1000
- Insular – 600 – 1200
- Viking – 700 – 1100
- Byzantine
- Merovingian
- Carolingian
- Ottonian
- Romanesque – 1000 – 1200
- Norman-Sicilian – 1100 – 1200
- Gothic – 1100 – 1400
  - International Gothic

== Renaissance ==
- Italian Renaissance – late 13th century – c. 1600 – late 15th century – late 16th century
- Renaissance Classicism
- Early Netherlandish painting – 1400 – 1500
- Early Cretan School – post-Byzantine art or Cretan Renaissance 1400 – 1500
- Mannerism and Late Renaissance – 1520 – 1600, began in central Italy

== Baroque to Neoclassicism ==
- Baroque – 1600 – 1730, began in Rome
  - Dutch Golden Age painting – 1585 – 1702
  - Flemish Baroque painting – 1585 – 1700
  - Caravaggisti – 1590 – 1650
- Rococo – 1720 – 1780, began in France
- Neoclassicism – 1750 – 1830, began in Rome
- Later Cretan School, Cretan Renaissance – 1500 – 1700
- Heptanese School – 1650 – 1830, began on Ionian Islands

== Romanticism ==
- Nazarene movement – c. 1820 – late 1840s
- The Ancients – 1820s – 1840s
- Purismo – c. 1820 – 1860s
- Düsseldorf school – mid-1820s – 1860s
- Hudson River School – 1850s – c. 1880
- Luminism – 1850s – 1870s, United States
- Modern Greek art – 1830 – 1930s, Greece

== Romanticism to modern art ==
- Norwich school – 1803 – 1833, England
- Biedermeier – 1815 – 1848, Germany
- Academic – c. 1840 – 1900, began in France
- Realism – 1830 – 1870, began in France
- Barbizon school – 1830 – 1870, France
- Peredvizhniki – 1870 – 1890, Russia
  - Abramtsevo Colony – 1870s, Russia
- Hague School – 1870 – 1900, Netherlands
- American Barbizon School 1850 – 1890s – United States
- Spanish Eclecticism – 1845 – 1890, Spain
- Macchiaioli – 1850s, Tuscany, Italy
- Pre-Raphaelite Brotherhood – 1848 – 1854, England

== Modern art ==
Note: The countries listed are the country in which the movement or group started. Most modern art movements were international in scope.

- Impressionism – 1860 – 1890, France
  - American Impressionism – 1880, United States
- Cos Cob Art Colony – 1890s, United States
  - Heidelberg School – late 1880s, Australia
- Luminism (Impressionism)
- Arts and Crafts movement – 1880 – 1910, United Kingdom
- Tonalism – 1880 – 1920, United States
- Symbolism (movement) – 1880 – 1910, France/Belgium
  - Russian Symbolism – 1884 – c. 1910, Russia
  - Aesthetic movement – 1868 – 1901, United Kingdom
- Post-Impressionism – 1886 – 1905, France
  - Les Nabis – 1888 – 1900, France
  - Cloisonnism – c. 1885, France
  - Synthetism – late 1880s – early 1890s, France
- Neo-impressionism – 1886 – 1906, France
  - Pointillism – 1879, France
  - Divisionism – 1880s, France
- Art Nouveau – 1890 – 1914, France
  - Vienna Secession (or Secessionstil) – 1897, Austria
  - Mir iskusstva – 1899, Russia
  - Jugendstil – Germany, Scandinavia
  - Modernisme – 1890 – 1910, Spain
- Russian avant-garde – 1890 – 1930, Russia/Soviet Union
- Art à la Rue – 1890s – 1905, Belgium/France
- Young Poland – 1890 – 1918, Poland
- Hagenbund – 1900 – 1930, Austria
- Fauvism – 1904 – 1909, France
- Expressionism – 1905 – 1930, Germany
  - Die Brücke – 1905 – 1913, Germany
  - Der Blaue Reiter – 1911, Germany
  - Flemish Expressionism – 1911–1940, Belgium
- Bloomsbury Group – 1905 – c. 1945, England
- Cubism – 1907 – 1914, France
  - Jack of Diamonds – 1909 – 1917, Russia
  - Orphism – 1912, France
  - Purism – 1918 – 1926, France
- Ashcan School – 1907, United States
- Art Deco – 1909 – 1939, France
- Futurism – 1910 – 1930, Italy
  - Russian Futurism – 1912 – 1920s, Russia
  - Cubo-Futurism – 1912 – 1915, Russia
- Rayonism – 1911, Russia
- Synchromism – 1912, United States
- Universal Flowering – 1913, Russia
- Vorticism – 1914 – 1920, United Kingdom
- Biomorphism – 1915 – 1940s
- Suprematism – 1915 – 1925, Russia
  - UNOVIS – 1919 – 1922, Russia
- Dada – 1916 – 1930, Switzerland
- Proletkult – 1917 – 1925, Russia
- Productijism – after 1917, Russia
- De Stijl (Neoplasticism) – 1917 – 1931, Netherlands (Utrecht)
- Pittura Metafisica – 1917, Italy
- Arbeitsrat für Kunst – 1918 – 1921
- Bauhaus – 1919 – 1933, Germany
- The "Others" – 1919, United States
- Constructivism – 1920s, Russia/Soviet Union
  - Vkhutemas – 1920 – 1926, Russia
- Precisionism – c. 1920, United States
- Surrealism – since 1920s, France
  - Acéphale – 1936 – 1939, France
  - Lettrism – 1942 –
  - Les Automatistes 1946 – 1951, Quebec, Canada
- Devetsil – 1920 – 1931
- Group of Seven – 1920 – 1933, Canada
- Harlem Renaissance – 1920 – 1930s, United States
- American scene painting – c. 1920 – 1945, United States
- New Objectivity (Neue Sachlichkeit) – 1920s, Germany
- Grupo Montparnasse – 1922, France
- Northwest School – 1930s – 1940s, United States
- Social realism – 1929, international
- Socialist realism – c. 1920 – 1960, began in Soviet Union
  - Leningrad School of Painting – 1930s – 1950s, Soviet Union
  - Socrealism – 1949 – 1955, Poland
- Abstraction-Création – 1931 – 1936, France
- Allianz – 1937 – 1950s, Switzerland
- Abstract Expressionism – 1940s, Post WWII, United States
  - Action painting – 1940s – 1950s, United States
  - Tachisme – late-1940s – mid-1950s, France
  - Color field painting
  - Lyrical Abstraction
  - COBRA – 1946 – 1952, Denmark/Belgium/The Netherlands
  - Abstract Imagists – United States
- Art informel mid-1940s – 1950s

== Contemporary art ==
Contemporary art – 1946–present

Note: there is overlap with what is considered "contemporary art" and "modern art."

- Contemporary Greek art – 1945 Greece
- Vienna School of Fantastic Realism – 1946, Austria
- Neo-Dada – 1950s, international
- International Typographic Style – 1950s, Switzerland
- Soviet Nonconformist Art – 1953 – 1986, Soviet Union
- Painters Eleven – 1954 – 1960, Canada
- Pop Art – mid-1950s, United Kingdom/United States
- Woodlands School – 1958 – 1962, Canada
- Situationism – 1957 – early 1970s, Italy
- New realism – 1960 –
- Magic realism – 1960s, Germany
- Minimalism – 1960 –
- Hard-edge painting – early 1960s, United States
- Fluxus – early 1960s – late-1970s
- Happening – early 1960 –
- Video art – early 1960 –
- Psychedelic art – early 1960s –
- Conceptual art – 1960s –
- Graffiti – 1960s –
- Junk art – 1960s –
- Performance art – 1960s –
- Op Art – 1964 –
- Post-painterly abstraction – 1964 –
- Lyrical Abstraction – mid-1960s –
- Process art – mid-1960s – 1970s
- Arte Povera – 1967 –
- Art and Language – 1968, United Kingdom
- Photorealism – late 1960s – early 1970s
- Land art – late-1960s – early 1970s
- Post-minimalism – late 1960s – 1970s
- Postmodern art – 1970 – present
- Deconstructivism
- Metarealism – 1970 – 1980, Soviet Union
- Sots Art – 1972 – 1990s, Soviet Union/Russia
- Installation art – 1970s –
- Mail art – 1970s –
- Maximalism – 1970s –
- Neo-expressionism – late 1970s –
- Neoism – 1979
- Figuration Libre – early 1980s
- Street art – early 1980s
- Young British Artists – 1988 –
- Digital art – 1990 – present
- Toyism – 1992 – present
- Massurrealism – 1992 –
- Stuckism – 1999 –
- Remodernism – 1999 –
- Excessivism – 2015 –

== See also ==
- Aegean art
- African art
- Indigenous Australian art
- Arts of the ancient world
- Art of Ancient Egypt
- Art in Ancient Greece
- Asian art
- Buddhist art
- Confucian art
- Coptic art
- Hindu art
- Indian art
- Islamic art
- Naive Art
- Pre-Columbian art
- Pre-historic art
- Roman art
- Visigothic art
- Visual arts by indigenous peoples of the Americas
- Transgressive art
- Outsider art
