= Rayonism =

Russian art movement

Mikhail Larionov, Red Rayonism, 1913

Rayonism (or Rayism or Rayonnism) was a style of abstract art that developed in Russia in 1910–1914. Founded and named by Russian Cubo-Futurists Mikhail Larionov and Natalia Goncharova, it was one of Russia's first abstract art movements.

== Background ==
In 1909, Italian poet F. T. Marinetti published the Founding Manifesto of Futurism. The Futurists took speed, technology and modernity as their inspiration, depicting the dynamic character of early 20th century life; examples of Italian Futurists are Umberto Boccioni and Giacomo Balla. Shortly after the movement started, Russian Futurism, Ego-Futurism and Cubo-Futurism began; in Russia, the movement was developed by painter David Burliuk, poets Aleksei Kruchyonykh, Vasily Kamensky and Vladimir Mayakovsky, and many others. Larionov and Goncharova were early followers of Russian Futurism.

In 1910, the latter two people, together with many associates such as Aristarkh Lentulov and Ilya Mashkov, they founded the exhibiting society the Jack of Diamonds. However, in 1912, Goncharova and Larionov left, in protest at the group's reliance on French art, and organised their own rival exhibitions. It was then that Rayonism began, with a distinct vision of what abstract art was representative of. Larionov's approach to abstract painting was the idea that certain scientific principles, like radioactivity, ultraviolet light, and x-rays, were the foundation for the vision of what he wanted to create.

== History of the movement ==
Goncharova began to paint in the Rayonist style as early as 1909, but the Rayonist Manifesto by her and Larionov was written in 1912, and published the subsequent year. In the manifesto, Larionov expresses the following, "Long live the style of Rayonist painting created by us, free from realistic forms, existing and developing itself only according to its own pictorial laws."

The Rayonists sought an art that floated beyond abstraction, outside time and space, and to break the barriers between the artist and the public. Rayonist paintings thus focused on the rays reflecting from the objects, and how the rays moved. They derived the name from the use of dynamic rays of contrasting color, representing lines of reflected light — "intersection of reflected rays of various objects". At the famous 1913 Target exhibition, they introduced the style to the public.

Larionov and Goncharova also wrote:

The style of Rayonist painting that we advance signifies spatial forms which are obtained arising from the intersection of the reflected rays of various objects, and forms chosen by the artist's will. The ray is depicted provisionally on the surface by a colored line. That which is valuable for the lover of painting finds its maximum expression in a rayonist picture. The objects that we see in life play no role here, but that which is the essence of painting itself can be shown here best of all – the combination of color, its saturation, the relation of colored masses, depth, texture ... .

We do not sense the object with our eye, as it is depicted conventionally in pictures and as a result of following this or that device; in fact, we do not sense the object as such. We perceive a sum of rays proceeding from a source of light; these are reflected from the object and enter our field of vision.

Consequently, if we wish to paint literally what we see, then we must paint the sum of rays reflected from the object. But in order to receive the total sum of rays from the desired object, we must select them deliberately – because together with the rays of the object being perceived, there also fall into our range of vision reflected reflex rays belonging to other nearby objects. Now, if we wish to depict an object exactly as we see it, then we must depict also these reflex rays belonging to other objects – and then we will depict literally what we see ...

Now, if we concern ourselves not with the objects themselves but with the sums of rays from them, we can build a picture in the following way:

The sum of rays from object A intersects the sum of rays from object B, while a form emerges in the space between them driven by the artist's will.

Perception, not of the object itself, but of the sum of rays from it, is, by its very nature, much closer to the symbolic surface of the picture than is the object itself. This is almost the same as the mirage which appears in the scorching air of the desert and depicts distant towns, lakes, and oases in the sky (in concrete instances). Rayonism erases the barriers that exist between the picture's surface and nature.

Later that same year, the Rayonists started painting their faces; in explanation, Larionov and fellow theoretician Ilia Zdanevich wrote the manifesto "Why We Paint Our Faces", which included suggested Rayonist face painting designs as illustrations.

Rayonism ended with the start of the Great War.

The movement received minimal acceptance for their influence on Russian abstract art until a few pieces were acquired by the Tate Gallery in 1952. There are few locations where works representative of this style can be viewed by the public outside of galleries, primarily in London, New York, or Paris. Many exist in private collections, especially due to the long history of abstract art being frowned upon by the Soviets.

Although short-lived, Rayonism was a crucial step in the development of Russian abstract art. As Larionov said, it represented the "true freeing of art" from the former "realistic" conventions that had "oppressed" the artistic community.

Electro act "The Rayonists" took their name from the movement.

== See also ==
- Ray tracing (graphics)
