= The Knifegrinder (Malevich) =

1912–1913 painting by Kazimir Malevich

The Knifegrinder or Principle of Glittering
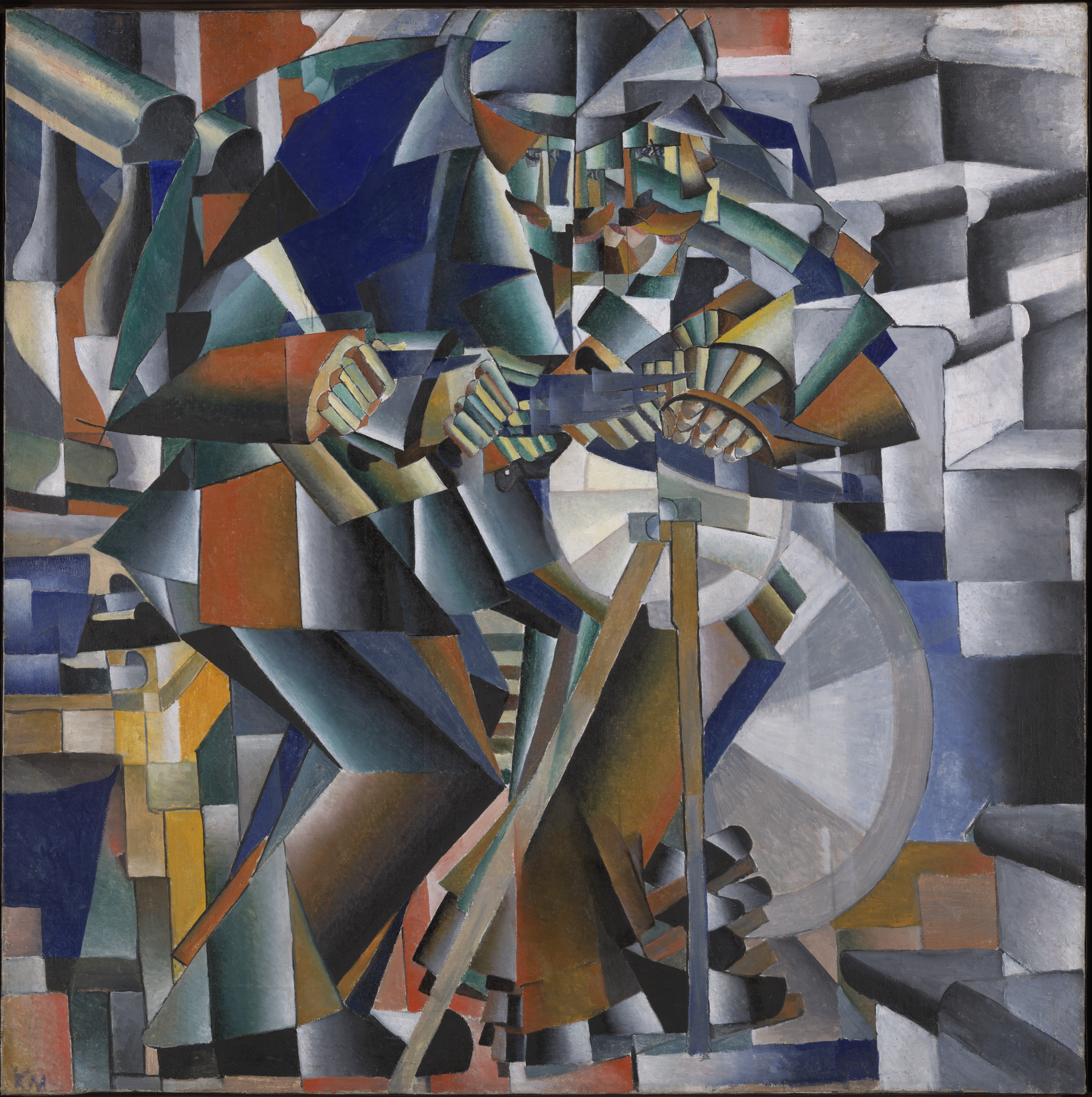
- Artist: Kazimir Malevich
- Year: 1912–1913
- Medium: Oil on canvas
- Dimensions: 79.534 cm × 79.534 cm (31.3125 in × 31.3125 in)
- Location: Yale University Art Gallery, New Haven

The Knifegrinder or Principle of Glittering (Russian: Точильщик, romanized: Tochil'schik Printsip Mel'kaniia), also called The Knifegrinder (The Glittering Edge), and sometimes shortened to simply The Knifegrinder, is a 1912–1913 cubo-futurist painting by the artist Kazimir Malevich, hence the fragmentation of form associated with futurism as well as the abstract geometry related to cubism. As of 2014, it is in the collection of the Yale University Art Gallery in New Haven, Connecticut.

== History ==
Very little documentation of the work exists, but it is known that it was painted circa 1912–1913, during the artist's Cubo-Futurist phase.

In 1941, it was given to the Yale University Art Gallery by the Collection Société Anonyme.

== Description ==
The artwork is typical of Malevich's other paintings, in that the subject matter is of a person generally overlooked by society.

The painting depicts a moustached man in a suit and hat manually grinding a knife on a knife sharpener, or a grinding wheel. The human is in a constant state of movement; the person is either repeatedly inspecting his progress on the knife, and, dismayed by the fact that it is not yet sharp enough, once more starts busily peddling the machine, is simply applying the blade to the machine in a fragmentary way, as though he were a novice, or is only shown carefully putting the blade to the sharpener in slow motion. Shavings of metal are suggested by chunks of green around the grinder's face and hands. Behind him on the left are some vases atop shelves and a table and possibly one or two metal pipes, whilst on the right are unclear grey objects (possibly buildings), implying that the person is a professional knife grinder in their workshop; a small staircase may also be observed at the bottom right corner.

Blues, greens, reds, and silvers are dominant in the painting; other colours used are orange, yellow, and brown. The metallic palette was probably chosen to emphasise the violent manner in which the shavings and knife glitter.
