= Aristarkh Lentulov =

Russian painter

- Born: 16 January [O.S. 4 January] 1882; Nizhny Lomov, Penza Governorate, Russian Empire
- Died: 15 April 1943 (aged 61); Moscow, Russian SFSR, Soviet Union
- Known for: Painter
- Movement: Post-Impressionism, Fauvism, Cubism, Orphism, Cubo-Futurism

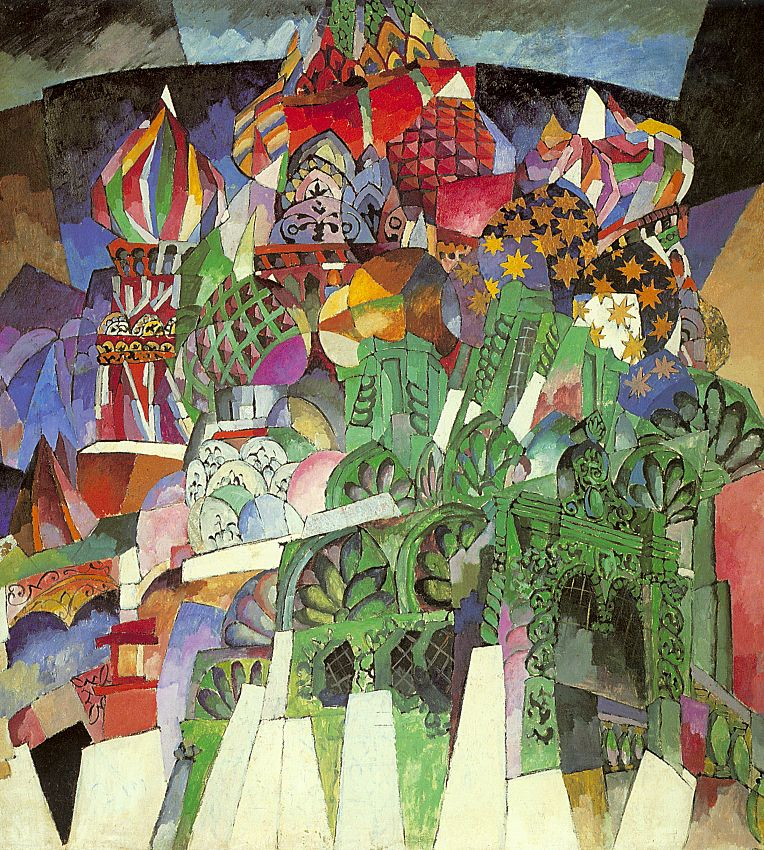
Saint Basil's Cathedral, 1913, Tretyakov Gallery, Moscow.

Aristarkh Vasilyevich Lentulov (Russian: Аристарх Васильевич Лентулов; 16 January [O.S. 4 January] 1882 – 15 April 1943) was a major Russian avant-garde artist of Cubist orientation who also worked on set designs for the theatre.

== Biography ==
Aristarkh Lentulov was born in the town of Nizhny Lomov in Penza Governorate, Russia, into the family of a rural priest. He studied art in Penza from 1898 to 1900 and Kiev Art School from 1903 to 1905, and then in the private studio of Dmitry Kardovsky in Saint Petersburg in 1906.

He lived in Moscow from 1909, and he was one of the founders of the avant-garde exhibiting association of artists, the Jack of Diamonds group. This group remained active until its dissolution in 1916.

From 1910 to 1911, Lentulov went to Paris to study at the studios of Henri Le Fauconnier and Jean Metzinger and the Académie de La Palette, and painted as independent artist in France and Italy. The 1910s were for Lentulov a period of creative productivity and experimentation. He was drawn to Orphism influenced by the French artist Robert Delaunay. Whilst there, he became acquainted with contemporary French painters such as Albert Gleizes, Jean Metzinger, Fernand Léger and Robert Delaunay and after absorbing fauvists' and cubists' principles, developed his own unique colorful style of painting. Later, after his return to Russia in 1912 he became a major influence on what to become the Russian futurism and in particular Cubo-Futurism. Wassily Kandinsky and Kazimir Malevich were both influenced by him.

Lentulov also formed another group, with Vladimir Mayakovsky and Kazimir Malevich, called Today's Lubock (Segodnyashnii Lubok). They produced satire art that was anti-Austria and anti-Germany. The art pulled inspiration from Russian folklore and lubok art. Lentulov's own art was heavily inspired by traditional and folk Russian architecture.

From pre-revolutionary times, Lentulov was actively involved in various theatrical projects, designing for plays in the Kamerny Theatre (The Merry Wives of Windsor, 1916) and contributing sets for a production of Scriabin's Prometheus in the Bolshoi Theatre in 1919.

In 1928, Lentulov entered into the Society of Moscow artists, which included artists formerly associated with the Jack of Diamonds group. He became chairman of the Society and also started teaching at the Russian state art and technical school (VKhUTEMAS).

Lentulov died in Moscow in 1943. He was buried in the Vagankovo Cemetery.

== Selected works ==
- Saint Basil's Cathedral, 1913, Tretyakov Gallery, Moscow.
- Ringing, 1913, GTG
- Moscow, 1913, GTG;
- In The iverskoy, 1916, GTG;
- View with the red house, 1917;
- Churches. New Jerusalem , 1917;
- Aleksandra Khokhlova, 1919
- Self-portrait with the violin
- Portrait A. 4. Tairova. 1920;
- The cracking of petroleum refinery, 1931, GTG;
- Night on the patriarch ponds, 1928, GTG;
- Passionate area at night, 1928, GRM
- Sunset in the Volga, 1928;
- The sun above the roofs. Rise, 1928;
- Vegetables, 1933, GTG
- Building of the metro over the Lubyanka area, 1936, GTG;
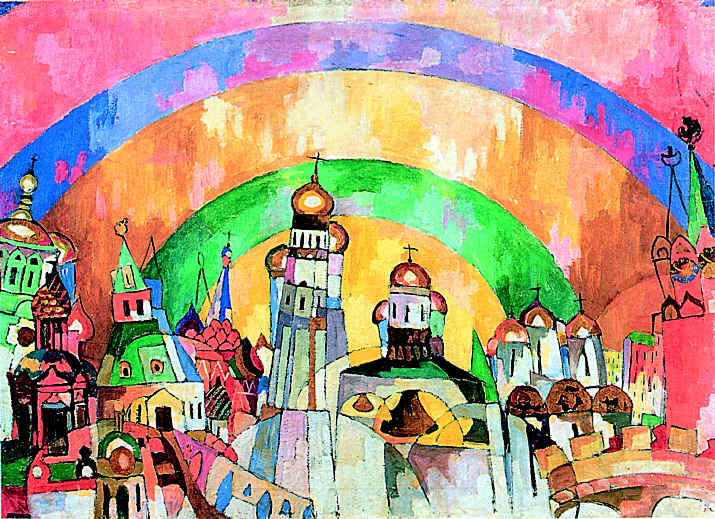
Skybell (Nebozvon), 1915

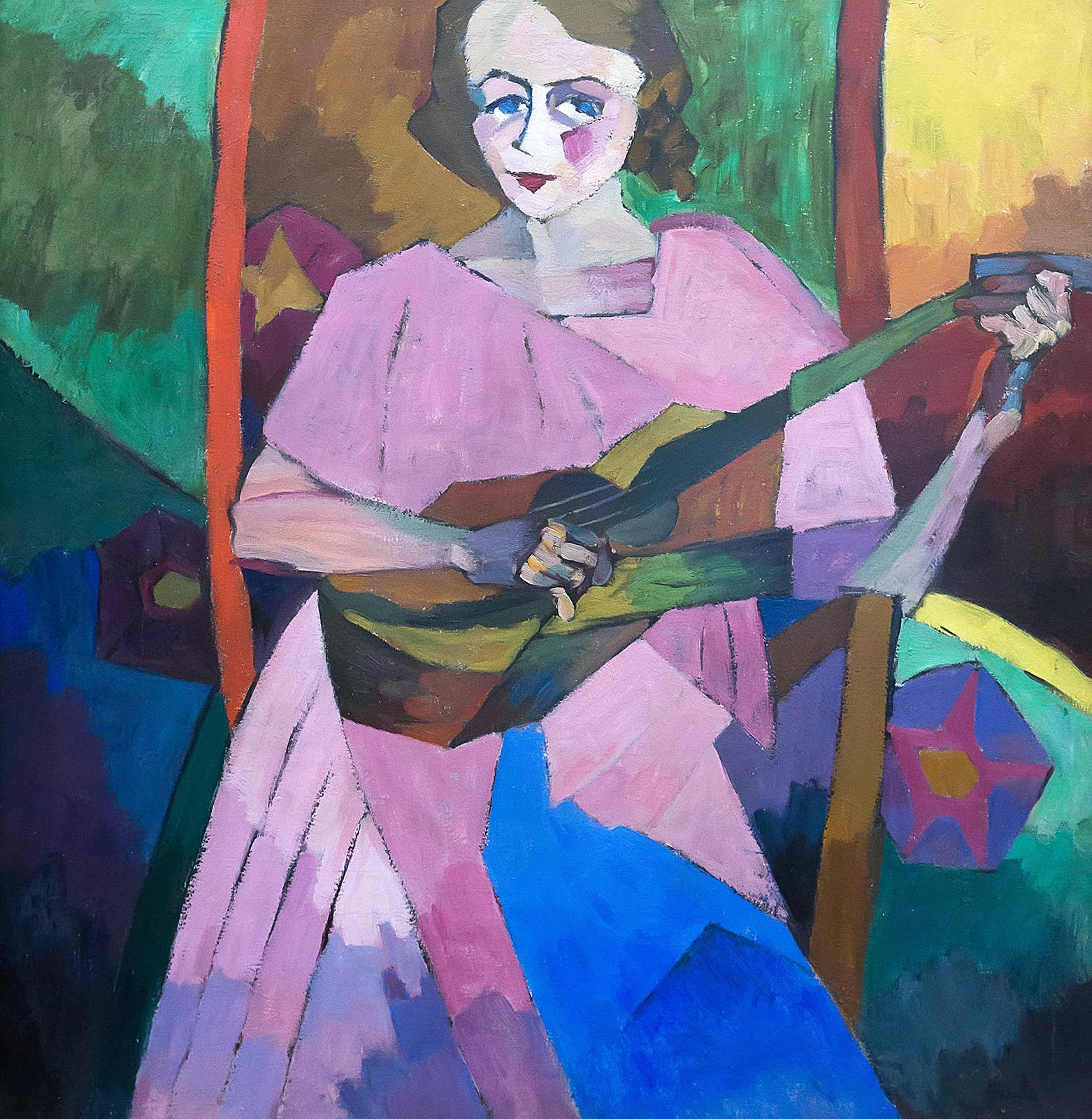
Woman with Guitar, 1913

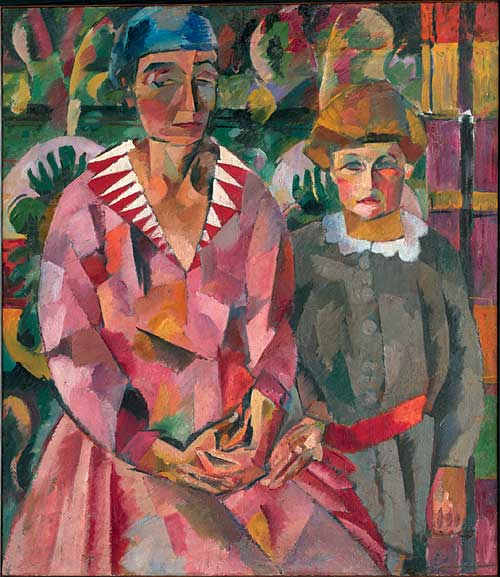
Portrait of Artist's Wife and Daughter, 1915

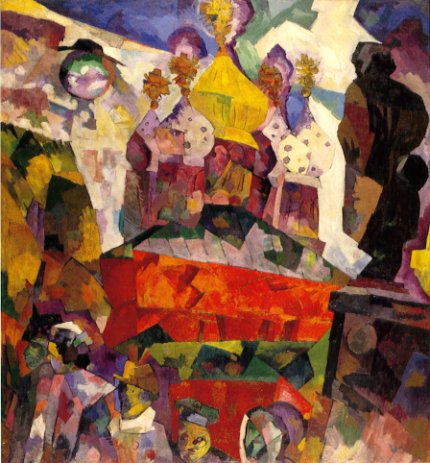
Tverskoi Boulevard, 1917

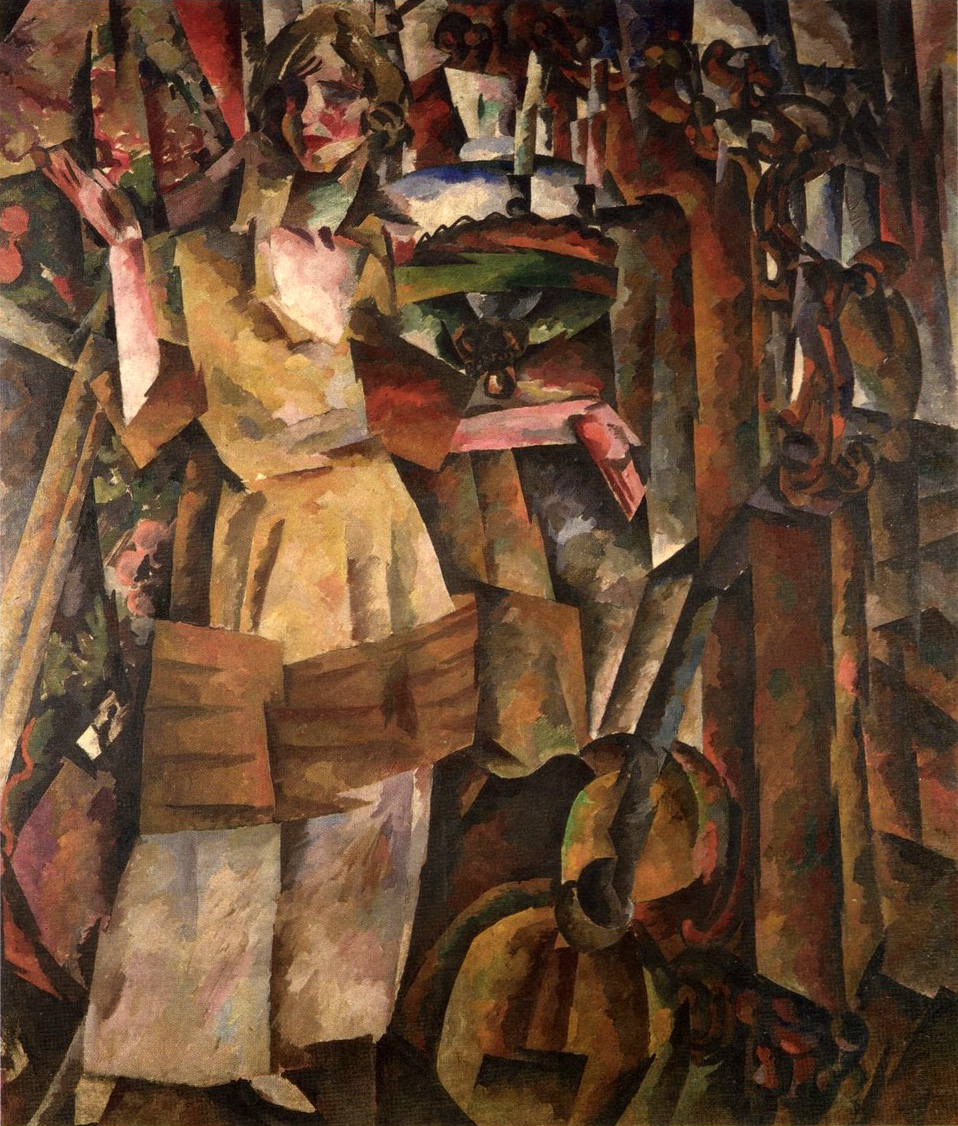
Aleksandra Khokhlova, 1919

== See also ==
- List of Russian artists

== Bibliography ==
- Lentulova M., Khudozhnik A. Lentulov. Recollections. M., 1969.
- Aristarkh Lentulov. Catalog of exhibition, M., 1968
