= Modern art (disambiguation) =

Modern art is a developed from the mid-19th century to the 20th century.

Modern art may also refer to:

- Modern Art (game), a card game by Reiner Knizia
- The Modern Art, a psychedelic rock band
- Modern architecture
- Modern Art (Art Pepper album), 1957
- Modern Art (Art Farmer album), 1958
- Modern Art (John Foxx album), 2001
- Modern Art (The Rippingtons album), 2009
- Modern Art (Matthew Sweet album), 2011
- Modern Art EP, an EP by Chronic Future
- Modern Art (illusion), a stage magic trick sometimes regarded as a variant of dividing a woman in half

== See also ==
- Contemporary art
