= Vladimir Burliuk =

Ukrainian artist

- Владимир Бурлюк
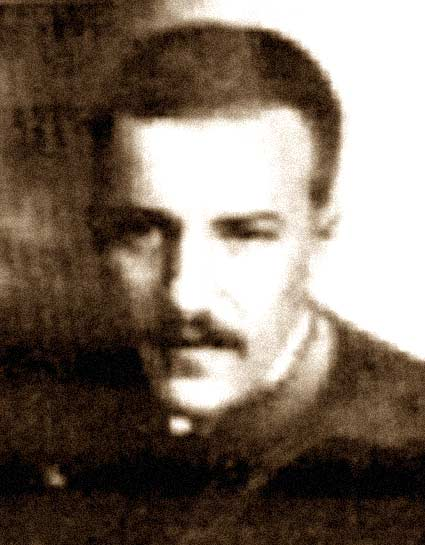
- Born: March 27, 1886; Kotelva, Kharkov Governorate, Russian Empire (now Poltava Oblast, Ukraine)
- Died: 1917; Thessaloniki, Greece
- Movement: Primitivism, Cubo-Futurism

Vladimir Davydovych Burliuk (Russian: Влади́мир Дави́дович Бурлю́к; Ukrainian: Володи́мир Дави́дович Бурлю́к, romanized: Volodymyr Davydovych Burliuk; 27 March [O.S. 15 March] 1886 – 1917) was a Ukrainian avant-garde artist (Neo-Primitivist and Cubo-Futurist) and book illustrator from the Russian empire. He died at the age of 32 in 1917 in World War I.

== Biography ==
Vladimir Davydovych Burliuk was born on March 15, 1886, in Kotelva, the younger brother of David Burliuk. His family is partly descended from Ukrainian Cossacks who held premier positions in the Hetmanate. His mother, Ludmila Mikhnevich, was of ethnic Belarusian descent.

In 1903 he studied under Anton Ažbe in Munich, and a year later he was a soldier in the Russo-Japanese War. From 1905 to 1910 Burliuk attended the Kyiv Art School. He lived in various places while going to KKHU, starting in Moscow, where he lived from 1907 until 1908. In 1908 he returned to Kiev and was in close contact with Aleksandra Ekster and Mikhail Larionov. Together with the members of the group The Link (Zveno) Wladimir and David Burliuk organized an avant-garde exhibition in Kyiv.

From 1909 to 1910 he lived in St.Petersburg and from 1910 to 1911 he lived in Moscow. In 1910 he became the member of the group Jack of Diamonds together with David Burliuk, Ekster, Malevich (later also Nathan Altman and Wladimir Tatlin). In the same year he became the member of the group of avant-garde artists known as the Soyuz Molodyozhi (Union of the Youth).

In 1911 he joined the art school in Odesa. From 1913 to 1915 he illustrated many futuristic publications in Moscow, including the book The Assistance of the Muses in Spring (1915). He also co-illustrated Velimir Khlebnikov's Roar! Gauntlets, 1908–1914 alongside Kazimir Malevich.

He was drafted into the Imperial army in 1916 and was killed the following year while fighting on the Macedonian front of World War I.

== Gallery ==
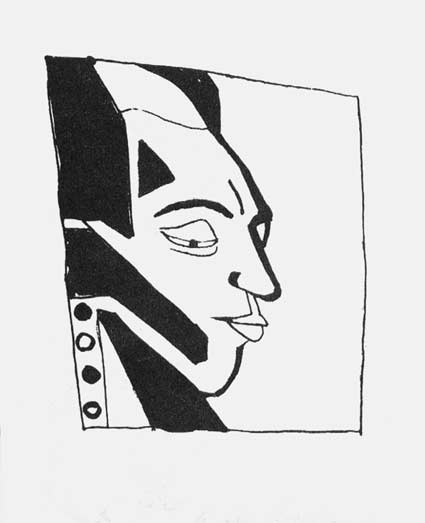
Velemir Khlebnikov, 1913

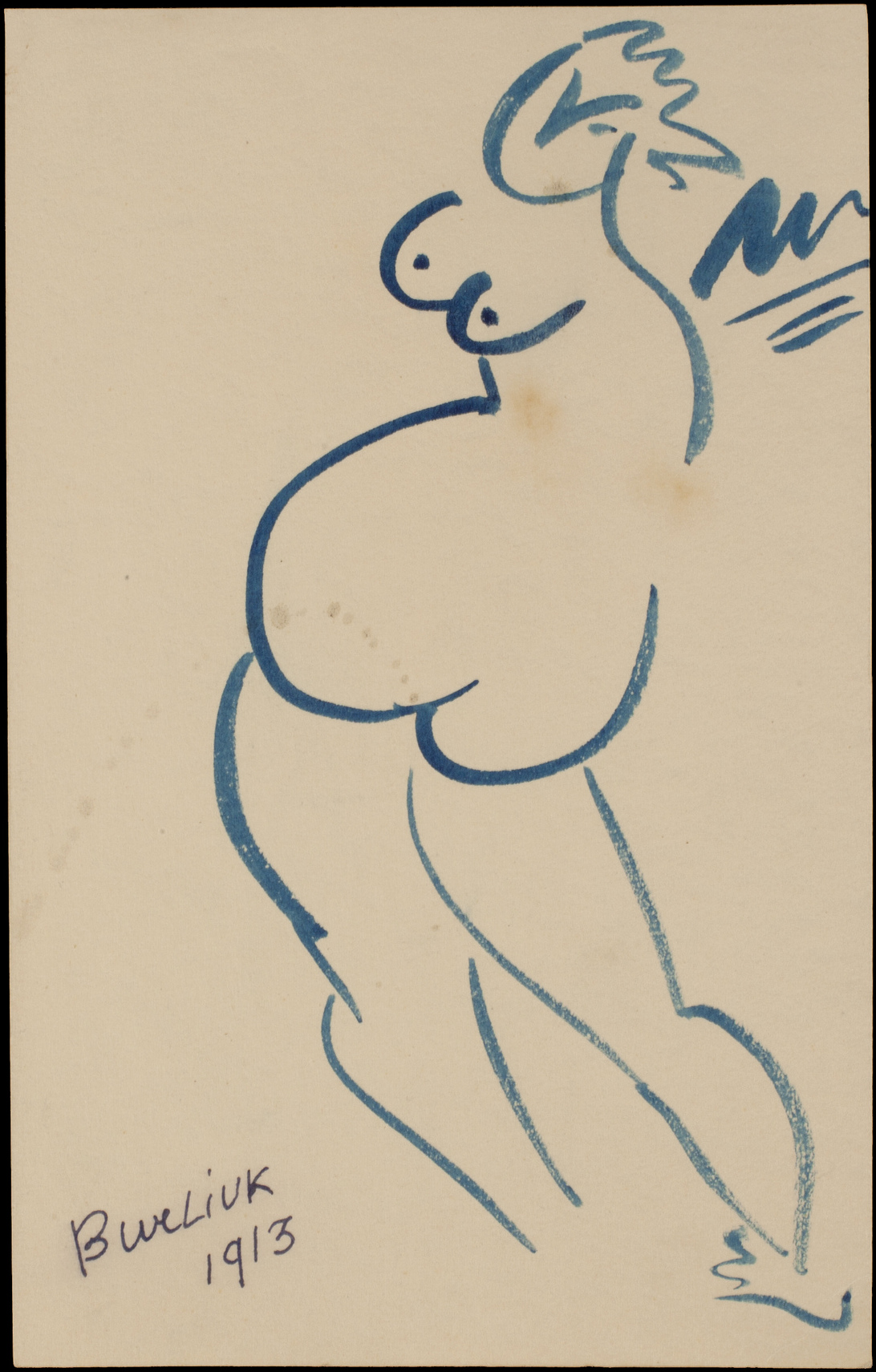
Femme Figure, 1913; M.T. Abraham Foundation

Orchard 1908-1909
