= Vasily Kamensky =

Russian Cubo-futurist poet (1884–1961)

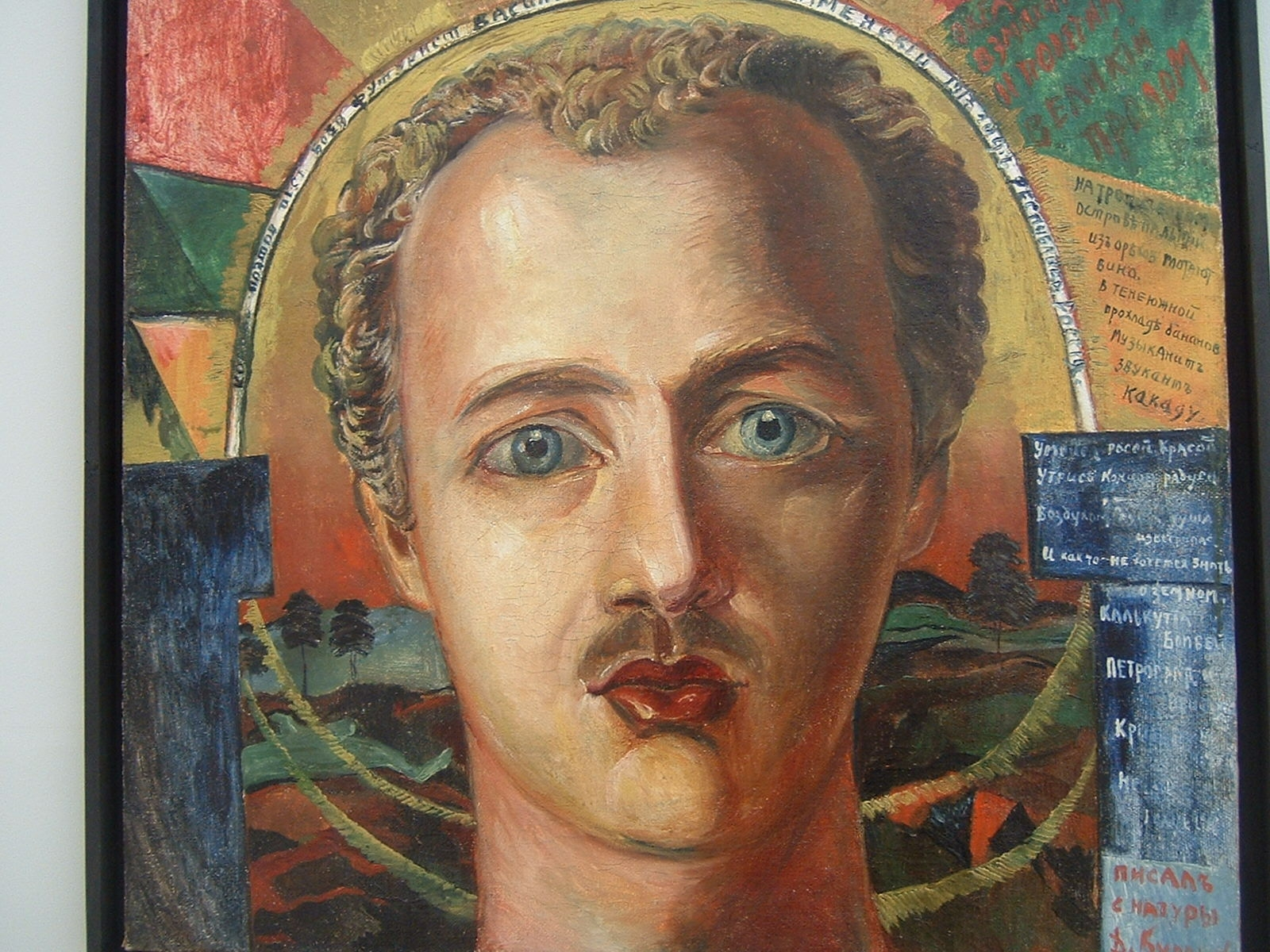
- Portrait of Kamensky by David Burliuk, 1916
- Born: Vasily Vasilyevich Kamensky; April 17, 1884; Perm, Russian Empire
- Died: November 11, 1961 (aged 77); Moscow, Soviet Union
- Occupations: Writer, poet, artist
- Known for: Futurism

Vasily Vasilyevich Kamensky (Russian: Васи́лий Васи́льевич Каме́нский; 17 April [O.S. 5 April] 1884 – November 11, 1961) was a Russian Futurist poet, playwright, and artist as well as one of the first Russian aviators.

== Biography ==
Kamensky was born in Perm, where his father was an inspector of goldfields. (The story that he was born on a boat on the Kama River, which he himself promoted and recounts in his memoirs, is untrue.) He lost his parents at the age of five and went to live in Perm with his aunt, whose husband piloted steam tugs on the river; he later wrote "My whole childhood took place in a house on the Kama wharf among tugs, barges, rafts, boats, stevedores, sailors, bargees, captains..."

He left school in 1900, and from 1902 to 1906 worked as a railroad clerk. In 1904 he began to contribute to the newspaper Permskii Krai, publishing poems and notices; at the newspaper he met local Marxists and developed his own leftist political orientation. At this time he also took up acting and traveled around Russia with a theatrical troupe. On his return to the Urals, he became an agitator and led the strike committee at Nizhny Tagil, for which he was sentenced to prison. On his release, he traveled to Istanbul and Tehran; the impressions from this Eastern trip would leave a mark on his later work.

=== Working in Moscow ===
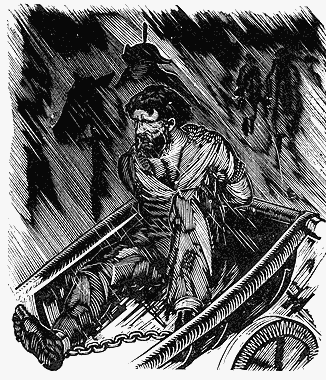
Nikolay Dmitrevsky, "The way". Wood engraving to a poem by Vasily Kamensky "Yemelyan Pugachev"

In 1906 he arrived in Moscow, where in 1908 he began working as an editor on the journal Vesna (Spring), meeting important Moscow writers such as David Burliuk, with whom he studied painting, and Velimir Khlebnikov. Two years later the three collaborated with other writers on the anthology Sadok sudei (A cage [or hatchery] for judges) and formed the proto-Futurist group Hylaea (Russian: Гилея [Gileya]), soon joined by Aleksei Kruchyonykh and Vladimir Mayakovsky.

In 1910 Kamensky published his first prose work, the short novel Zemlyanka (The mud hut), "in which urban life is abandoned for the joy and beauty of nature," but its lack of success temporarily discouraged him from further literary endeavor.

Kamensky left Moscow to travel around the country, and became one of the first Russians to master the new art of aviation, flying a Blériot XI; he brought the Russian word самолет [samolyot] 'airplane' into circulation. After an airplane crash in 1911, however, he gave up flying. For a couple of years he lived on his estate near Perm, but in 1913 he moved back to Moscow, though he toured Russia with Burlyuk and Mayakovsky, promoting Futurism; "from this time Kamensky was an invariable participant in Futurist collections, newspapers, journals, and public appearances." He also returned to literary activity, in 1914 publishing his poetry collection Tango s korovami (Tango with cows) and in 1915 his long poem Stenka Razin, about the 17th-century rebel.

=== The October Revolution ===
He welcomed the October Revolution of 1917, and was one of the first writers elected to the Moscow Soviet of Workers' and Soldiers' Deputies. In November he "persuaded Filippov, the Moscow baker (his shops had been the center of struggle during the February Days and even earlier during the 1905 revolt in Moscow), to subsidize a small café for poets. It was located in an old laundry on a small pereulok called Nastasyinsky just off the Tverskaya." (Soon anarchists began frequenting the Poets' Café, and after it closed in April 1918 they set up their journal Anarkhiya there.) For the first anniversary of the October Revolution, he turned Stenka Razin into a play; Robert Leach writes that this "most convincing version created a very strong impression when it was presented at the Vvedensky People's House, Moscow":

Stenka Razin was played by Nikolai Znamensky from the Moscow Art Theatre, the play was designed in an attractive childish-primitive style by Pavel Kuznetsov and directed by Meyerhold's former pupil, Arkady Zonov, and Vasily Sakhnovsky, formerly Komissarzhevsky's partner at the theatre named after Vera Komissarzhevskaya. It was, wrote one critic, an 'enormous success', partly at least because it 'reeked of streets and circus'.... The play employs an utterly direct and simple style, with plenty of clowning but a minimum of Futurist mannerisms, and achieves something of the spirit of the folktale.

=== Kamensky's waning years ===
That was the peak of Kamensky's career. In the 1920s he played a minor role in Mayakovsky's LEF group; in the 1930s he wrote his memoir, Put' entuziasta (The path of an enthusiast, 1931), and two more historical dramas, Emelyan Pugachev (1931) and Ivan Bolotnikov (1934). On April 19, 1948, he suffered a stroke that left him paralyzed until his death in 1961; the house in which he lived in the village of Troitsa in the Perm Krai from 1932 to 1951 is now a museum.

The Dictionary of Literary Biography sums up his career in these words:

Kamensky was involved in significant literary events throughout his career and knew many people who were central to the Russian avant-garde. His zhelezobetonnye poemy (ferroconcrete poems) were among the boldest and most distinctive experiments in Russian Futurism, and he freely adapted other Futurist techniques to his own impressionist style. Although his greatest contribution to literature was most likely his discovery of Velimir Khlebnikov, Kamensky was a creative poet in his own right and an active participant in the artistic life of Russia in the first third of the twentieth century.

== See also ==
- Russian Futurism
