= Madan Lal Madhu =

Indian poet and translator (1925-2014)

- Born: 1925; British India
- Died: 7 July 2014 (aged 88–89); Moscow, Russia
- Occupations: Writer; Translator; Poet
- Known for: Translation of Russian classics
- Spouse: Tatyana
- Children: A son and a daughter
- Awards: Padma Shri; Medal of Pushkin; Order of Friendship

Madan Lal Madhu (1925–2014) was an Indian poet and translator, known for his translations of Russian classics into Hindi. He was one of the founders of Hindustani Samaj, an Indian community in Moscow and a recipient of the Medal of Pushkin and the Order of Friendship of the former Soviet Union. The Government of India awarded him the fourth highest civilian award of Padma Shri in 1991.

== Biography ==
Madhu, born in 1925, secured his master's degree before starting his career as an academic, working as a teacher for 10 years, during which time he started writing plays, poems and literary criticisms. He had early acquaintance with Russian culture when he secured his PhD, based on a comparative study of the works of Maxim Gorky and Premchand. In 1957, during the India visit of the then president of the now defunct Soviet Union, Nikita Khrushchev, he was invited to serve as a translator in Moscow, in view of his knowledge of Russian culture. Moving to Moscow, he was entrusted with the job of translating the works of Karl Marx and Vladimir Lenin into Hindi which he did by referring to the English language translations of the original, as he did not know the Russian language then. Soon, he learned the language so that he could refer to the original works and, apart from Communist literature, started translating Russian classics.

Madhu translated over 100 Russian classics into Hindi language, including War and Peace and Anna Karenina of Leo Tolstoy, poems of Chukovsky and Marshak and several works of Pushkin, Dostoyevsky, Gogol, Turgenev, Kuprin, Lermontov, Mayakovsky and Chekhov. Besides, he translated the works of Premchand into Russian language and published two volumes of poems, Ek Do Teen and Aise Ladke Bhi Hote Hain, several plays and literary articles. He also wrote two memoirs, Yadoon ke Dhundle Ujale Chehre is one among them. He was one of the founders of the Hindustani Samaj, an Indo-Russian cultural forum based in Moscow and served as its president for over 30 years. The Indian Embassy in Moscow celebrated his fifty years of service in the city in 2008 and the Russian Centre of Science and Culture, New Delhi honoured him on the occasion of 55 years of Russian life in 2013.

The Government of India awarded him the civilian honour of the Padma Shri in 1991. A recipient of the Medal of Pushkin, he was awarded him the Order of Friendship of the Russian Federation in 2001. He died on 7 July 2014, aged 88, in the Russian capital, following a cardiac arrest. He was a divorcee and had a son and a daughter. Hindustani Samaj, has instituted an annual literary competition, Padma Shri Madan Lal Madhu Translation competition and the Embassy of India in Moscow has named a corner of its library as Padma Shri Madan Lal Madhu corner, in his honour.

== See also ==
- Leo Tolstoy
- Chukovsky
- Marshak
- Pushkin
- Dostoyevsky
- Gogol
- Turgenev
- Kuprin
- Lermontov
- Mayakovsky
- Chekhov
