= Artur Fonvizin =

Russian painter

Artur Vladimirovich Fonvizin
- Born: Artur Vladimirovich Fonvizin; 11 January 1883; Riga, Russian Empire
- Died: 19 August 1973 (aged 90); Moscow, Russian SFSR, Soviet Union
- Known for: Painting
- Movement: Formalism, Expressionism
- Awards: Honoured Artist of the Russian Federation

Artur Vladimirovich Fonvizin (Russian: Артур Влади́мирович Фонви́зин, from German: von Wiesen; 11 January 1883 – 19 August 1973) was a Soviet painter of watercolours.

== Biography ==
Artur Fonvizin was born on 11 January 1883 in Riga, Governorate of Livonia, Russian Empire (now Latvia), the son of a German-born forester.

=== Studies ===
After finishing high school in 1901, he went to study at the Moscow School of Painting, Sculpture and Architecture. His early works were signed von Wiesen. His teachers were K. N. Gorski, V. N. Baksheev, and P. I. Klodt.

There he met Mikhail Larionov, the leader of the Union of Youth, ready to "subvert the old art." When the Union arranged an exhibition without the permission of the school authorities, he was expelled from the school, along with Mikhail Larionov and Sergei Sudeikin.

In 1904, he moved to Munich, where he continued his studies at private art studios.

In 1906, he returned to Russia, to live for a time with his parents in their village.

=== Shows ===
From 1907 until the Great War, as a member of Larionov's group, Fonvizin was a notable participant in the exhibitions Blue Rose (1907), Stephanos (1909), Union of Youth, the first exhibition of the Jack of Diamonds (December 1910), the exhibitions Target and The Donkey's Tail (1910–12). He participated in the salons of the Golden Fleece and Wreath-Stephanos, and joined the World of Art movement. His works of this period can be characterized as symbolist, in the so-called lyrical primitive style. His most famous works of the time are The Bride (1902), Leda (1904), and Composition with the figure of Christ (1904).

When the First World War started, Fonvizin moved to the province of Tambov, where he painted a great deal from nature. In 1918, he headed the art studio at the Proletarian Culture artistic organisation in Tambov. In 1922, he became a member of the creative organization Makovets and participated in its exhibitions. In 1923, he taught at the Art College of Nizhny Novgorod. In 1926, he returned to the Tambov studio of illustrative art.

=== A World of Watercolors ===
In 1927, he went to Moscow, where the following year he joined the Society of Artists of Moscow and the Association of Artists of Revolutionary Russia. At the same time, he moved on to watercolours, his primary medium for the rest of his life. In 1929, he visited Leningrad, where he sketched views of the city; in the early 1930s he travelled to Kerch and Askania-Nova. Other works of those years include illustrations for 1001 Nights (1932), and A German Romantic Tale (1936).

His first solo exhibition was held at the Pushkin Museum in 1936.

In 1937, during a Communist campaign against formalism in art, the Soviet press lumped him with The Gang of Formalists (which comprised The Three F's: Falk, Favorsky, and Fonvizin).

From the beginning of the 1940s to his death, the main themes of the artist's works were portraits of theatre actresses in stage costume, sketches of the circus, pictures of pre-revolutionary life, images of flowers, and landscapes. Fonvizin's distinguishing characteristic is that he painted directly, without the use of preparatory sketches in pencil.

=== Exiled ===
In 1943, because of his German descent, Fonvizin was exiled to Kazakhstan. There he began his cycles Karaganda and The Cabmen.

From 1958 to 1960, the artist lived in the village of Pirogovo, where he painted landscapes.

He continued to exhibit his works after the Second World War. His personal exhibitions were held in the Union of Theatrical Artists of the Russian Federation (1940), Central House of Artistic Workers (1944, 1947), Central House of Litterateurs (1955), in the halls of the Moscow Union of Artists (1958), and at the Union of Artists of the USSR (1969).

In 1970, he received the title of Honoured Artist of the Russian Federation.

He died on 19 August 1973 in Moscow.

Sketches and watercolor portraits of actors and artists, landscapes and still lifes by Fonvizin are kept in the Tretyakov Gallery, the Pushkin Museum, and the State Russian Museum.
