= Nikolay Kuznetsov =

Nikolay Kuznetsov or Nikolai Kuznetsov may refer to:

- Nikolai Kuznetsov (admiral) (1904–1974), Soviet Navy admiral, Hero of the Soviet Union
  - Russian aircraft carrier Admiral Kuznetsov, aircraft carrier built in 1991, named after the naval officer
- Nikolai Kuznetsov (artilleryist) (1922—2008) Hero of the Soviet Union and full bearer of the Order of Glory
- Nikolai Kuznetsov (botanist), President of the Estonian Naturalists' Society 1905–1911
- Nikolay Kuznetsov (cyclist) (born 1973), Russian cyclist, brother of Svetlana Kuznetsova
- Nikolay Kuznetsov (fencer) (1882–after 1912), Russian fencer
- Nikolay Kuznetsov (footballer) (born 1999), Russian football player
- Nikolai Kuznetsov (pianist) (born 1994), Russian pianist
- Nikolai Kuznetsov (pilot) (1922–2009), Director of the Kazakh Soviet Socialist Republic Administration of Civil Aviation
- Nikolay Kuznetsov (rower) (born 1953), Soviet rower
- Nikolai Kuznetsov (spy) (1911–1944), Soviet intelligence agent during World War II
- Nikolay Kuznetsov (water polo) (1931–1995), Soviet water polo player
- Nikolai Dmitriyevich Kuznetsov (1911–1995), Soviet jet and rocket engine designer, Hero of Socialist Labor
- Nikolai Dmitriyevich Kuznetsov (painter) (1850–1930), Ukrainian-Russian painter
- Nikolai Efimovich Kuznetsov (1879–1970), Russian and Soviet painter
- Nikolai Yakovlevich Kuznetsov (1873–1948), Russian entomologist, paleoentomologist and physiologist
- Nikolay V. Kuznetsov (born 1979), Russian nonlinear dynamics and control theory scientist
- Nicolas Kusnezov, or Nikolaj Nikolajevich Kuznetsov-Ugamsky (1898–1963), a notable myrmecologist
