= Knave of Diamonds (arts association) =

Russian artistic group

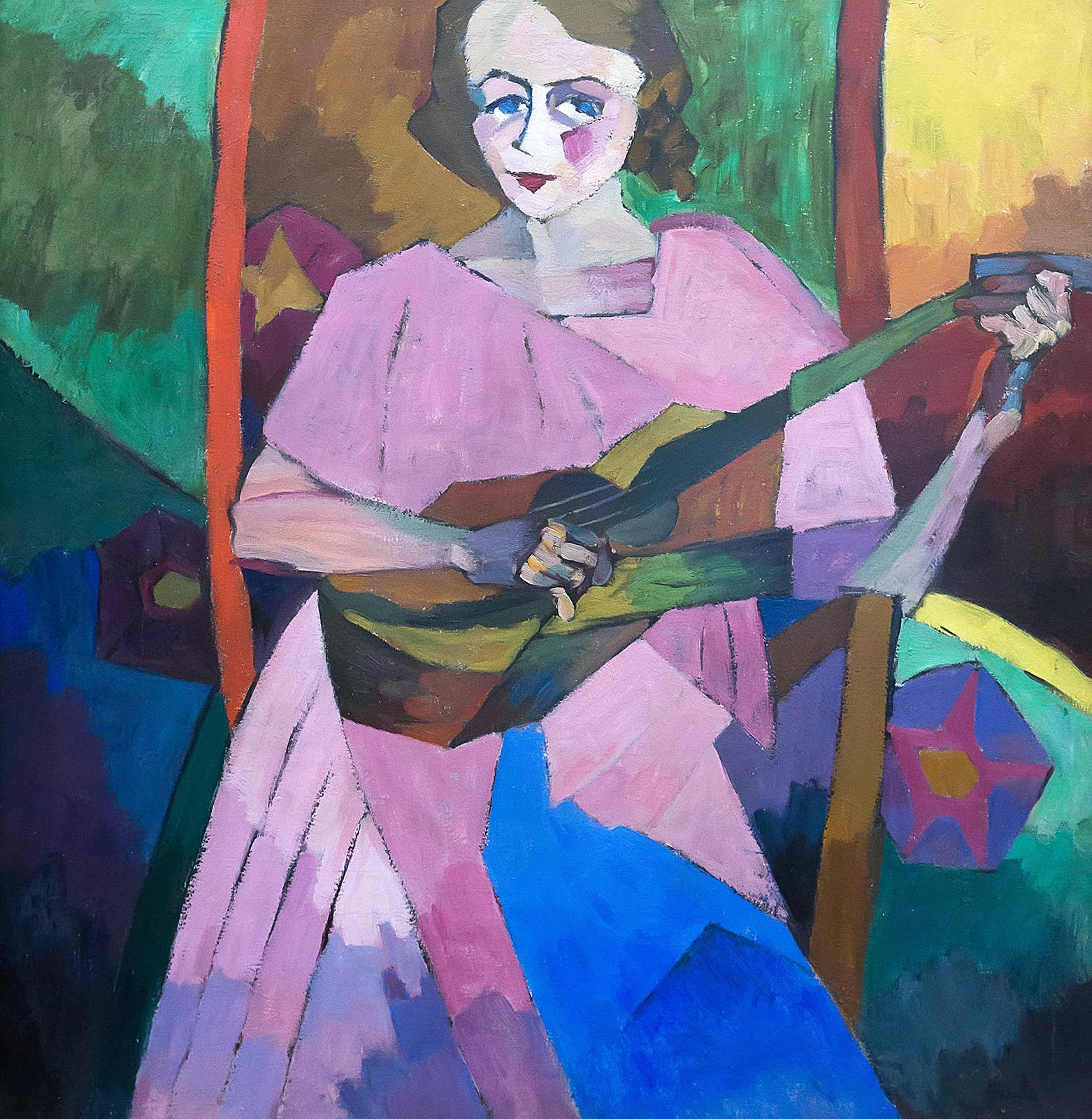
Aristarkh Lentulov, Woman with a Guitar, 1913

Knave of Diamonds (Russian: Бубновый валет, romanized: Bubnovy valet), also called Jack Of Diamonds, was a circle of avant-garde artists in Russia, heavily influenced by French painting styles, who sought "to unite the stylistic system of Cézanne with the primitive traditions of folk art, the Russian lubok (popular prints) and tradesman's signs." Named for the eponymous exhibition held in Moscow in 1910, the group's intention was to provoke the art establishment in Russia, challenge "good taste," and shock. The group remained active until December 1917.

== Inception: The Knave of Diamonds First Exhibition, Moscow, 1910 ==
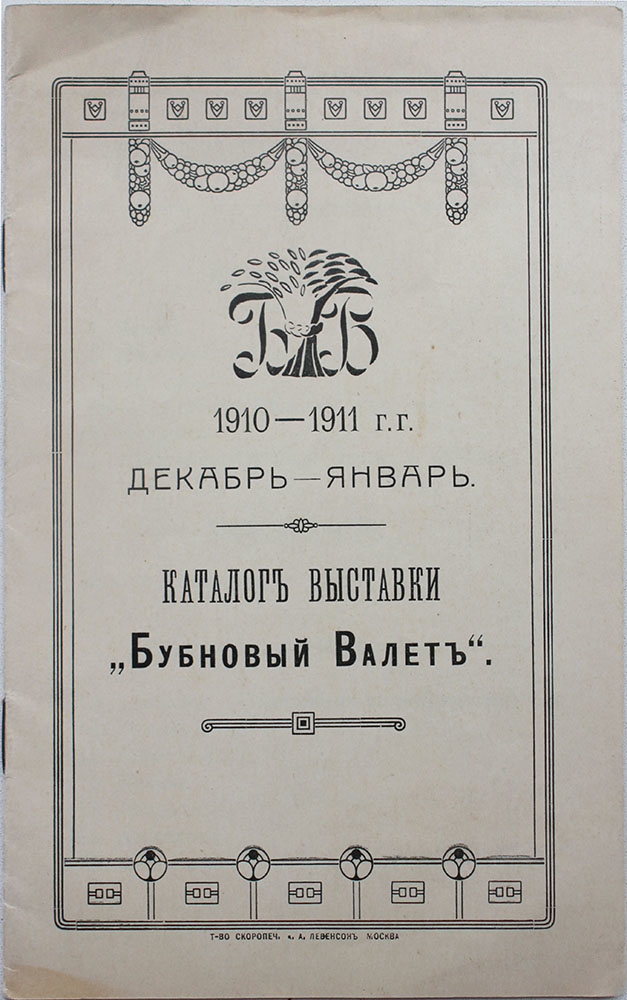
Knave of Diamonds Exhibition Catalogue (1910) Moscow, Russia

The inaugural Knave of Diamonds exhibition opened in Moscow in Levisson Building on 10 December 1910, and ran through to January 16, 1911, and included works by thirty eight artists.

The exhibition featured French cubist paintings by Henri Le Fauconnier, André Lhote, Albert Gleizes, Jean Metzinger and Luc Albert Moreau. Curated by Alexandre Mercereau, the exhibition additionally included works by Russian-German expressionists from Munich Wassily Kandinsky and his partner Gabrielle Munter, Alexey von Jawlensky and Marianne von Werefkin, Germans (including Ernst Ludwig Kirchner, Otto Mueller, Alexander Kanoldt, Adolf Erbslöh, Italian Erma Bossi, the Dutch from Paris (including Kees van Dongen), Russian-French Léopold Survage and Russian artists active in the Moscow scene, including the group of young artists recently expelled from the Moscow School of Painting, Sculpture and Architecture due to their "leftist tendencies".

A stated objective of the exhibition was "to offer young Russian artists who find it extremely difficult to get accepted for exhibitions under the existing indolence and cliquishness of our artistic spheres, the chance to get onto the main road."

But the exhibition's name itself, coined by Mikhail Larionov because "he liked the sound of it." was itself a salvo at the exhibition-attending public of the period. While one contemporary account blandly concluded: "Organizers regard the title Knave of Diamonds as a symbol of young enthusiasm and passion, 'for the knave implies youth and the suit of diamonds represents seething blood,'" the public itself understood the symbolism to trend in a different direction: "unaccustomed to such novel titles," they assumed the show to be "a gambling house or brothel," and "in no way an art exhibition." The reviews that followed were commensurately critical.

The Moscow painters, admirers of modern French artistic styles and frequent visitors to collectors Sergei Shchukin's and his rival Ivan Morozov's houses (from 1909, Shchukin's mansion was open every afternoon Sunday for public viewing) where they could admire canvases by Cézanne, Henri Matisse, Van Gogh, Gauguin and Pablo Picasso, included Mikhail Larionov and his wife Natalya Goncharova, Pyotr Konchalovsky, Aristarkh Lentulov, Ilya Mashkov, Aleksandr Kuprin, Vasily Rozhdestvensky, Robert Falk, David Burlyuk and his brother Vladimir Burlyuk, Aleksey Morgunov, Artur Fonvizin, Boris Takke, Sergei Lobanov and Victor Savinkov, brother of revolutionary Boris Savinkov.

Kazimir Malevich and Alexandra Exter also participated in the first exhibition.

== Notable members and associates ==
The group was founded by Pyotr Konchalovsky (elected Chairman), Aristarkh Lentulov (founding member, ensured funding for the first exhibition through his rich father-in-law Pyotr Rukin and his merchant colleagues from Nizhny Novgorod), Mikhail Larionov and Natalya Goncharova, Ilya Mashkov (elected secretary), Aleksandr Kuprin (elected treasurer), Vasily Rozhdestvensky (founding board member), and included Robert Falk, David Burliuk, Wladimir Burliuk, Vasily Kamensky, Velimir Khlebnikov, Kazimir Malevich, Alexander Osmerkin, Alexander Shevchenko, Aleksey Kruchenykh, Adolf Milman, Lyubov Popova, Vladimir Mayakovsky, Antonina Sofronova, and Moisey Feigin. Their works demonstrate the artists’ interest in the developing of the new styles (Russian Primitivism, Russian Cezanneism, Moscow School of Neo-Primitivism, among others) that emerged around their first exhibition as a result of their integrating folk art of the provinces in the artworks. Other new styles and genres, such as performance and body-art, emerged from this unlikely blending of fine European art, Russian folk art, and urban folk of the masses in Russia. The artistic significance of the individual members of The Knave of Diamonds aside, their activities conditioned a qualitative shift in Russian art of the 1910s. Among the most important changes was the democratization of the art society in Russia.

=== Moscow's Fractious Avante-Garde ===
The show's title was subsequently adopted to form a new artistic association in Moscow, an association which soon became the largest and one of the most significant exhibition societies. This group of artists contended that Moscow would be the future of the contemporary art scene, with its artists revitalizing depleted Western European culture with the purity and vitality of their work. With a nod to Dadaist ideas, the group as a whole paid close attention to traditionally crafted toys, indigenous art forms, signboards, and even icons. The lubok print style was exalted, and folklore motifs embraced. "The Russian artists were following the paths that Gauguin, Matisse and Picasso had gone down in discovering the primitives of Africa and Oceania, with the only difference that they did not need to go far away to find inspiration but got it at home - in shop signs, in tin-ware or the works of other non-professional folk artisans."

In 1912, the more radical members of the group, including Mikhail Larionov and Goncharova, split to form the Donkey's Tail.

== Exhibitions ==
- Knave of Diamonds (10 Dec 1910 — 16 Jan 1911) at Levisson house, Bolshaya Dmitrovka Street, Moscow
- Knave of Diamonds (23 (or 25) Jan — 26 Feb 1912) at Moscow Military District Economic Society of Officers, 10 Vozdvizhenka str., Moscow
- Knave of Diamonds (7 Feb — 7 Mar 1913) at Levisson house, Bolshaya Dmitrovka Street, Moscow, 3 – 28 April, St. Petersburg
- Knave of Diamonds (5 Feb — 2 Mar 1914) at Society of Lovers of Art, Moscow
- Artists of Moscow for Victims of the War (6 Dec 1915 — 18 Jan 1916)
- Knave of Diamonds (6 Nov — 19 Dec 1916) at Kira Mikhailova Art Salon, Bolshaya Dmitrovka Street, Moscow
- Knave of Diamonds (21 Nov — 3 Dec 1917) at Kira Mikhailova Art Salon, Bolshaya Dmitrovka Street, Moscow
- Vystavka proizvedenii khudozhnikov gruppy 'Bubnovyi valet' [Knave of Diamond Retrospective (1927)] Moscow

=== The Second Exhibition (1912) ===
The Second Exhibition (23 Jan — 26 Feb 1912) at Moscow Military District Economic Society of Officers, 10 Vozdvizhenka str., Moscow included the French Pablo Picasso, Albert Gleizes, André Derain, Robert Delaunay, Charles Camoin, Fernand Leger, Henri Le Fauconnier, Henri Matisse, Othon Friesz, German Ernst Ludwig Kirchner, August Macke, Franz Marc, Otto Mueller, Max Pechstein, Heinrich Nauen, Erich Heckel and Wassily Kandinsky with Gabrielle Munter, Kees van Dongen, Norwegian Xan Krohn, Russians Alexandra Exter, Pyotr Konchalovsky, Nikolai Kulbin, Aleksandr Kuprin, Aristarkh Lentulov, Ilya Mashkov, Adolf Milman, Robert Falk, Victor Savinkov, David Burlyuk and his brother Vladimir Burlyuk, Alexis Gritchenko.

=== The Third Exhibition (1913) ===
The Third Exhibition (7 Feb — 7 Mar 1913) at Levisson house, Moscow, and 3 – 28 April, St. Petersburg included the French Pablo Picasso and Georges Braque, Henri Rousseau, Maurice de Vlaminck, André Derain, Henri Le Fauconnier, Paul Signac, Albert Marquet, Swiss-French Félix Vallotton, Latvian-French Frédéric Fiebig, Dutch Kees van Dongen, Conrad Kickert, Lodewijk Schelfhout, Czech Otakar Kubín, Russians Alexandra Exter, Pyotr Konchalovsky, Ilya Mashkov, Aleksandr Kuprin, Aristarkh Lentulov, Adolf Milman, Vasily Rozhdestvensky, Vladimir Tatlin, Robert Falk, Victor Savinkov, David Burlyuk and his brother Vladimir Burlyuk, Alexis Gritchenko.

=== The Fourth Exhibition (1914) ===
The Fourth Exhibition (5 Feb — 2 Mar 1914) at Society of Lovers of Art, Moscow included the French Pablo Picasso and Georges Braque, Maurice de Vlaminck, André Derain, Henri Le Fauconnier, Dutch Conrad Kickert, Lodewijk Schelfhout, Russians Alexandra Exter, Kazimir Malevich, Lyubov Popova, Nadezhda Udaltsova, Pyotr Konchalovsky, Ilya Mashkov, Aleksandr Kuprin, Aristarkh Lentulov, Adolf Milman, Vasily Rozhdestvensky, Robert Falk, Victor Savinkov, David Burlyuk and his brother Vladimir Burlyuk.

=== The Fifth Exhibition (1916) ===
The Fifth Exhibition (6 Nov — 19 Dec 1916) at Kira Mikhailova Art Salon, Bolshaya Dmitrovka Street, Moscow due to the 1WW could not show the works of the foreigners (save for Norwegian Xan Krohn) and included only the Russians Alexandra Exter, Kazimir Malevich, Ivan Kljun, Lyubov Popova, Nadezhda Udaltsova, Olga Rozanova, Ivan Puni, Xenia Boguslavskaya, Marc Chagall, Nathan Altman, Vera Pestel, Pyotr Konchalovsky, Aleksandr Kuprin, Aristarkh Lentulov, Robert Falk, Victor Savinkov.

=== The Sixth Exhibition (1917) ===
The Sixth Exhibition opened from 21 Nov (4 december) 1917 to December 3 (16) at R.Levisson House in Moscow, the very same place where the First inaugural “Knave of Diamonds” Exhibition had opened in 1910, and became the group’s last exhibition. In 1916, Knave of Diamonds was left by its original founders Pyotr Konchalovsky and Ilya Mashkov, with Alexander Kuprin replacing Konchalovsky as Chairman, and in 1917 the last of the original founders, Alexander Kuprin, Aristarkh Lentulov, Adolf Milman, Robert Falk and Vasily Rozhdestvensky also left. On October 14 (27), 1917, Kazimir Malevich was elected new chairman of the board, while Lev Bruni, Ivan Malyutin, Alexander Osmerkin, Lyubov Popova, Vladimir Tatlin, Nadezhda Udaltsova became full members of the society. The new members dominated the last Sixth Exhibition: Kazimir Malevich, Ivan Kliun, Olga Rozanova, Alexandra Exter, Vasily Kamensky, David Burliuk, Vladislav Khodasevich, Alexander Baryshnikov, A. M. Gumilina, N. M. Davydova, Xan Krohn and his wife Julia Holmberg-Krohn, Nikolai Kuznetsov, Mikhail Leblanc, Mikhail Menkov, D. V. Petrovsky, Eduard Shiman. At the Exhibition’s closing on December 3 (16), David Burliuk, Vasily Kamensky and Kazimir Malevich read the thesis called "Painting on Fences", and Knave of Diamonds was dismissed.

== Influences ==
The Knave of Diamonds defined "the Russian pre-revolutionary culture", a favorite culture of the Moscow intelligentsia in the 1970s.

== Related artist groups ==
Painters Mikhail Larionov, Natalia Goncharova, and a sub-group of artists ceded from the group to form the more radical Donkey's Tail, accusing the Knaves of artistic stagnation. Goncharova called out what she saw as the group's replacement of "artistic creation with theorizing." Despite these period claims, in retrospect, "it is hard to award primacy and originality of pictorial enterprise" to either group.

== Gallery ==
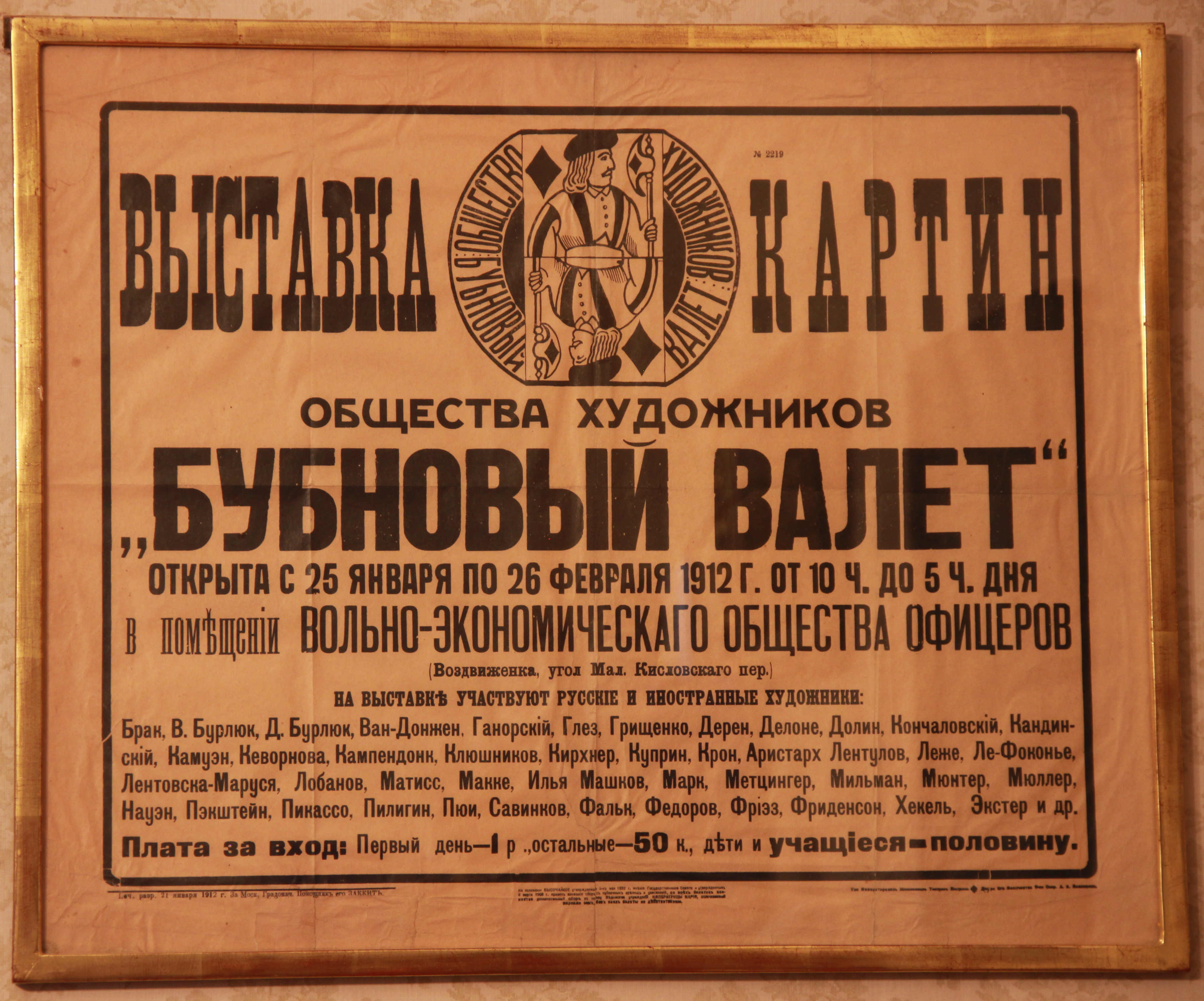
Knave of Diamond Exhibition 1912 Moscow

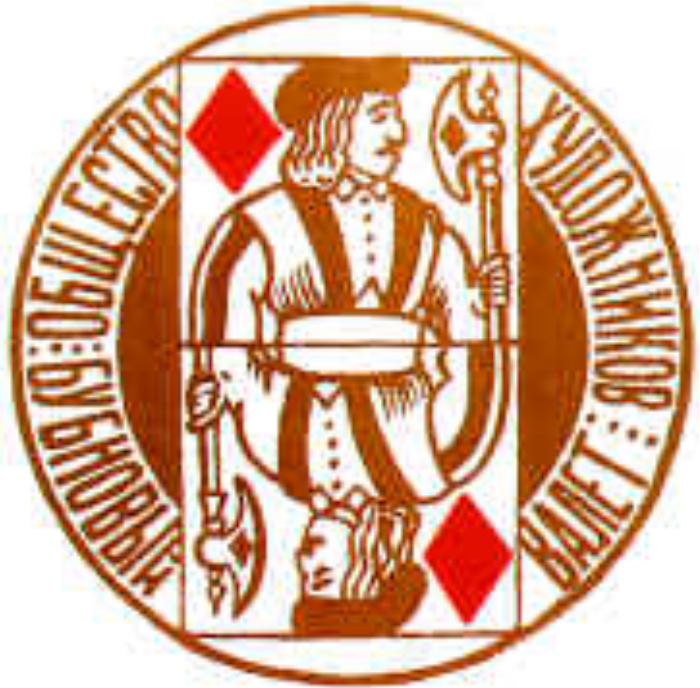
Knave of Diamonds logo designed by Aleksey Morgunov

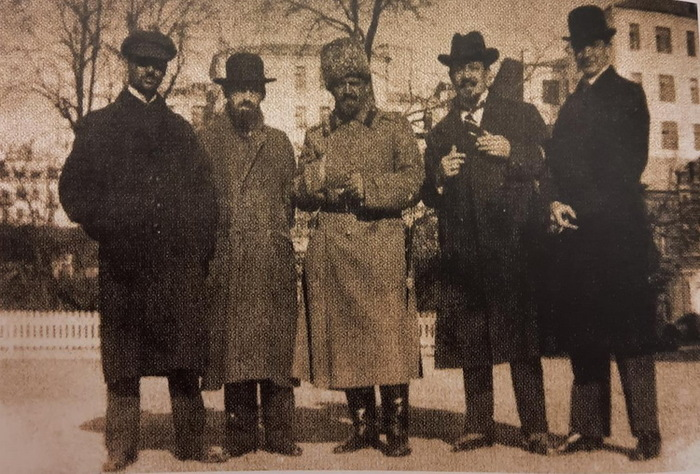
L-R: Pyotr Konchalovsky, Vasily Rozhdestvensky, Alexander Kuprin, Robert Falk, unknown. 1914

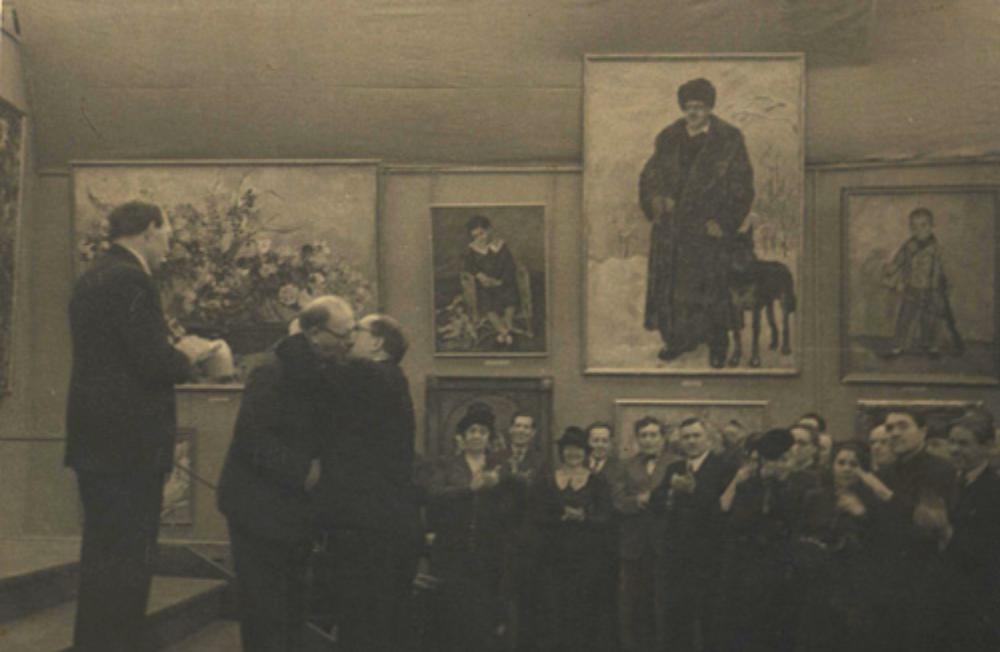
At Konchalovsky exhibition in 1941, Mashkov congratulates Konchalovsky

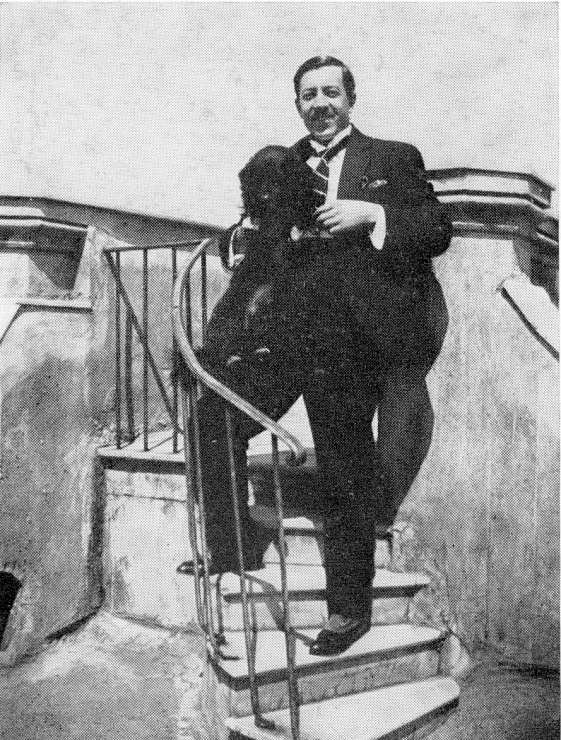
Ilya Mashkov above his study at Myasnitskaya in Moscow

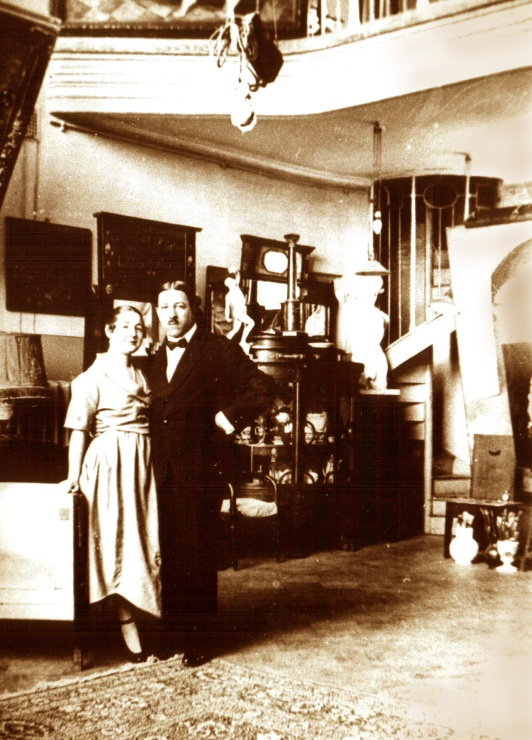
Ilya Mashkov with wife Maria at his workshop

== Literature ==
- Cubism and Its Histories, David Cottington - 2004
- Architecture and Cubism, Eve Blau, Nancy J. Troy - 2002
- A Cubism Reader: Documents and Criticism, 1906-1914, Mark Antliff, Patricia Dee Leighten - 2008
- Cubism, José Pierre - 1969
- Honour, H. and J. Fleming, (2009) A World History of Art. 7th edn. London: Laurence King Publishing, p. 784. ISBN 9781856695848
- Mark Antliff and Patricia Leighten, A Cubism Reader, Documents and Criticism, 1906–1914, University of Chicago Press, 2008, pp. 293–295
- Cottington, David (April 19, 2004). Cubism and Its Histories. Manchester University Press. ISBN 9780719050046.
- Mikhail Lifshitz, The Crisis of Ugliness: From Cubism to Pop-Art. Translated and with an Introduction by David Riff. Leiden: BRILL, 2018 (originally published in Russian by Iskusstvo, 1968)
- Daniel Robbins, Sources of Cubism and Futurism, Art Journal, Vol. 41, No. 4, (Winter 1981)
- Kolokytha, Chara; Hammond, J.M.; Vlčková, Lucie. "Cubism". Routledge Encyclopedia of Modernism.
