= Adolf Milman =

Russian and French painter (1886–1930)

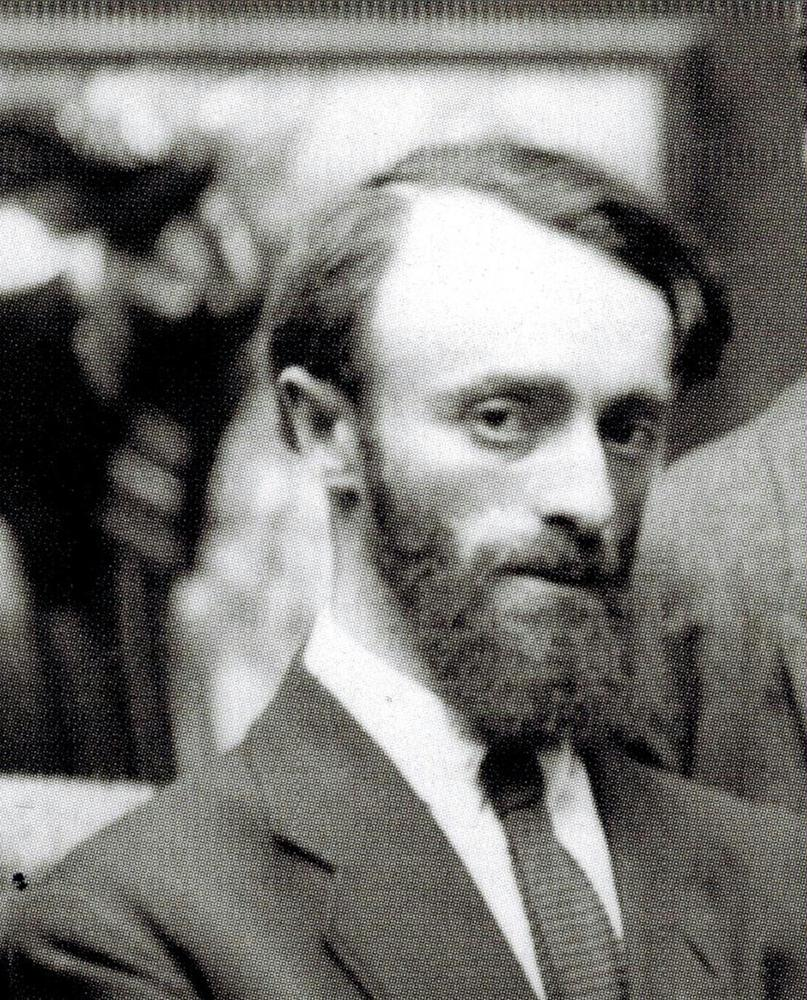
- Adolf Milman
- Born: c. 1886; Kishinev, Russian Empire
- Died: January 15, 1930; Paris, France
- Known for: Painter

Adolf Izrailevich Milman (Russian: Адольф Израилевич Мильман; c. 1886 – 15 January 1930) was a Russian and French painter.

== Biography ==
Milman was born into a large Jewish family in Kishinev, where he studied at a commercial school. In the early 1900s, the family moved to Moscow, where Milman entered the Moscow School of Painting, Sculpture and Architecture. From 1904 he attended the art studio of Ilya Mashkov, who soon became his good friend. In the same studio the young artist became friends with Robert Falk.

From 1911, he was a member of the review board of the Jack of Diamonds art group. His works were displayed at its group expositions in 1912–1914. In October 1917, Milman withdrew from the Jack of Diamonds group and joined the Mir Iskusstva society, along with Falk, Aristarkh Lentulov and others.

In 1912–1917, Milman taught in Mashkov's private studio of painting and drawing. The artist became ill with tuberculosis and took treatment in the Crimea annually from 1914.

In 1918, Milman took part in organizing the Fine Arts Department of Narkompros. The same year he moved to Kiev, where P. F. Chelishchev and S. M. Yutkevich were among his art students. Later he lived in Sudak in the Crimea. At the same time, he contracted sleeping sickness. His only personal exhibition took place in Feodosiya in 1920.

From 1921, the artist lived in Paris, where his paintings were repeatedly exhibited for several years (until 1924); however, he stopped painting in 1922. In 1920–1922, the Canadian artist Edwin Holgate studied with Milman. The artist spent the last eight years of his life bedridden and lost the ability to speak. He was buried in the Montparnasse Cemetery.

== Gallery ==
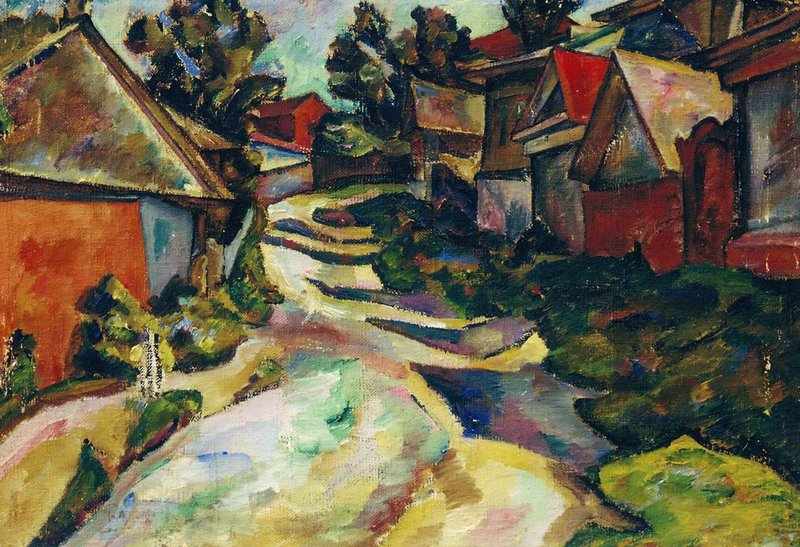
Village Street, 1913; (Taganrog Museum of Art)

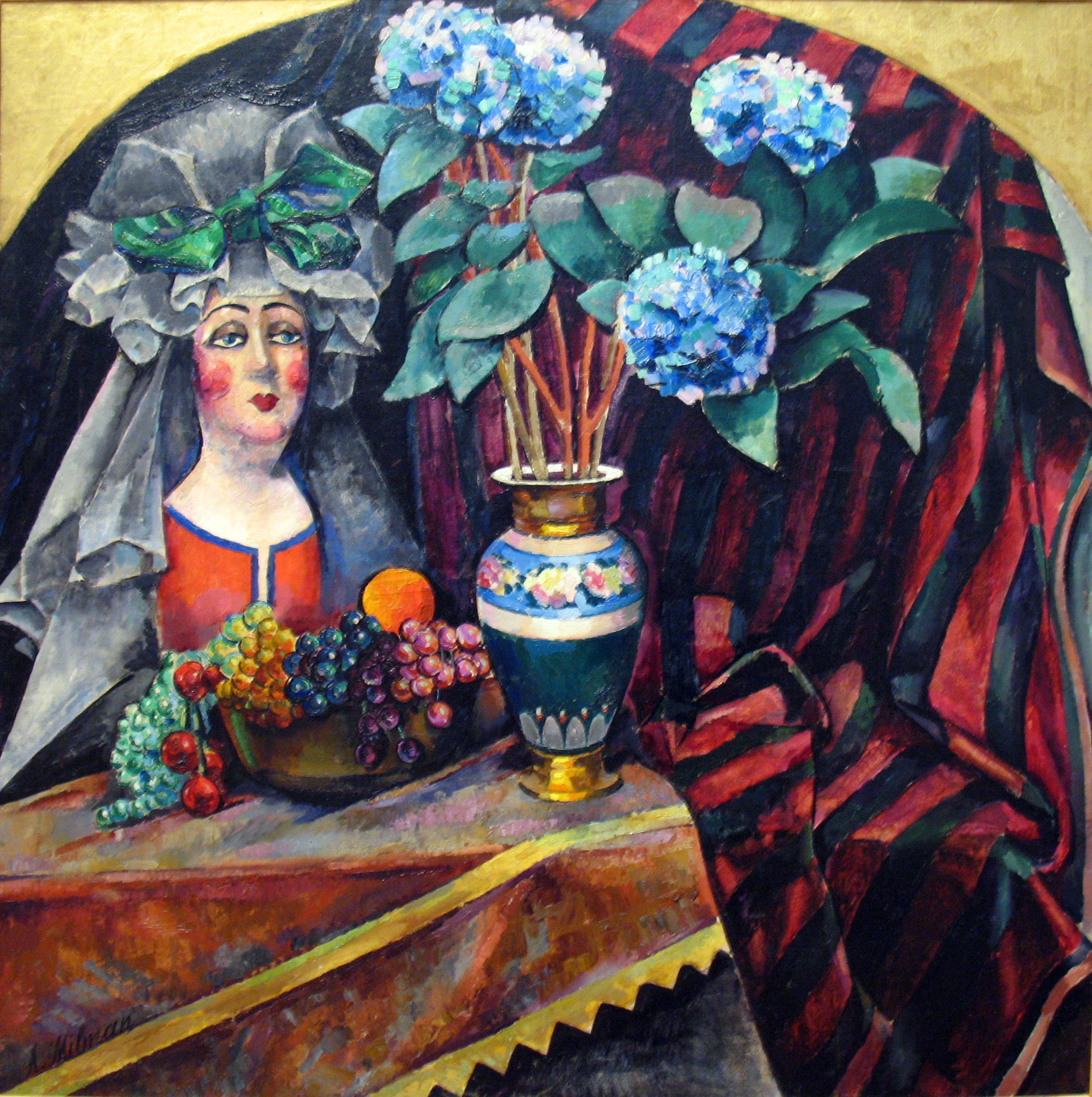
Still life with a doll, 1916; (Tretyakov Gallery)
