= Aleksey Morgunov =

Russian avant-garde painter

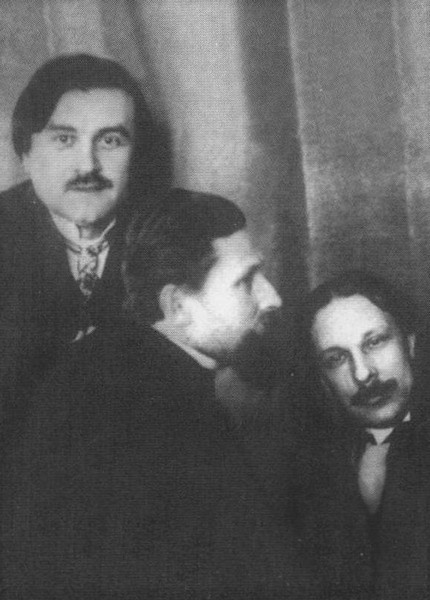
Malevich, Kliun and Aleksei Morgunov (1914)

Aleksei Alekseevich Morgunov (Russian: Алексей Алексеевич Моргунов; 21 October 1884, Moscow – 15 February 1935, Moscow) was a Russian Avant-Garde painter. His works were originally in the Neo-Primitivist style, but became influenced by Fauvism. Together with Kazimir Malevich and Ivan Kliun, he created a style known as "Februaryism". He later took up Neo-Classicism, then was forced to adopt the Socialist Realism model.

== Biography ==
He is generally believed to have been the illegitimate son of the painter, Alexei Savrasov and, like him, suffered from alcoholism in his later years. His mother, Yekaterina, died in 1920. His initial studies began at the Stroganov Moscow State Academy of Arts and Industry in 1899, but he also took private lessons from Konstantin Korovin and Sergey Ivanov. In 1904, he was accepted as a member of the Moscow Association of Artists and began to participate in their exhibitions. From 1909 to 1910, he travelled throughout Western Europe and came under the influence of Impressionism.

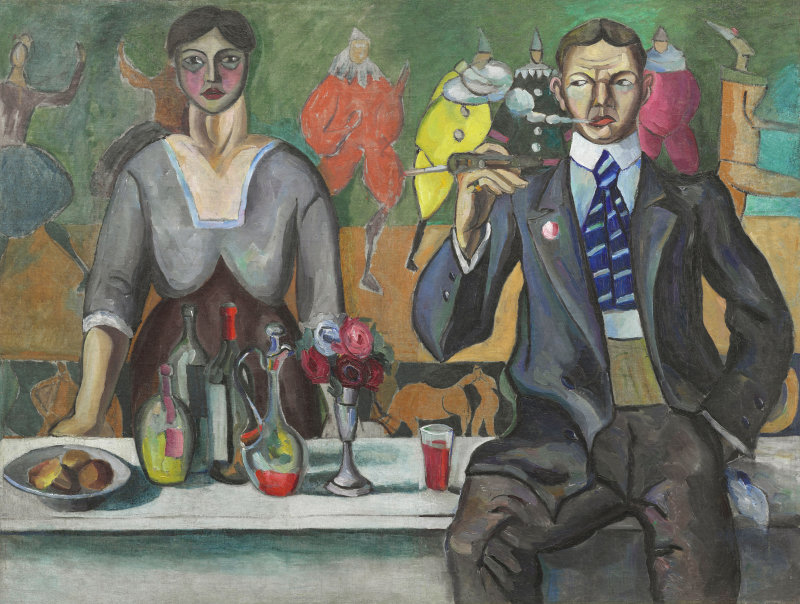
Natalia Goncharova and Mikhail Larionov, 1913; Art Institute, Chicago

Upon returning, he established an informal workshop which became a meeting place for left-wing artists. He also associated with a group of radical artists led by Mikhail Larionov and participated in his ground-breaking exhibition called the "Jack of Diamonds". He also exhibited with Larionov's even more radical group called the Donkey's Tail in 1912. By 1914, he had begun to move in other directions.

After that time, he became an associate of Kazimir Malevich. Together with Ivan Kliun, they created their own short-lived movement called "Fevrialism" (Februaryism), following a rather impolite debate at the Polytechnic Museum, in February. They were also known as the "лошкарей" (spoons) because they wore spoons in their buttonholes. He did not, however, stay with Malevich after the creation of the Suprematist movement. This was at a time when many of his personal relationships were beginning to suffer from his alcoholism.

He dropped out of the art community for a few years; returning during the early Soviet period. After the 1917 October Revolution by 1918, he was a member of the College of Fine Arts; a division of the People's Commissariat for Education (Narkompros). From 1920 to 1921, he worked for their procurement and tariff commission. For some of those years, he also served as a teacher at his alma mater, the Stroganov Academy (then known as the "First Free State Art Workshops") and participated in "Proletkult". He eventually adopted the requisite style of Socialist Realism. In the 1930s, several of his paintings were reproduced as postcards.

Thanks to the collector, George Costakis, some of his Fevrialist works may be seen at the Museum of Modern Art in Thessaloniki.

== Selected paintings ==
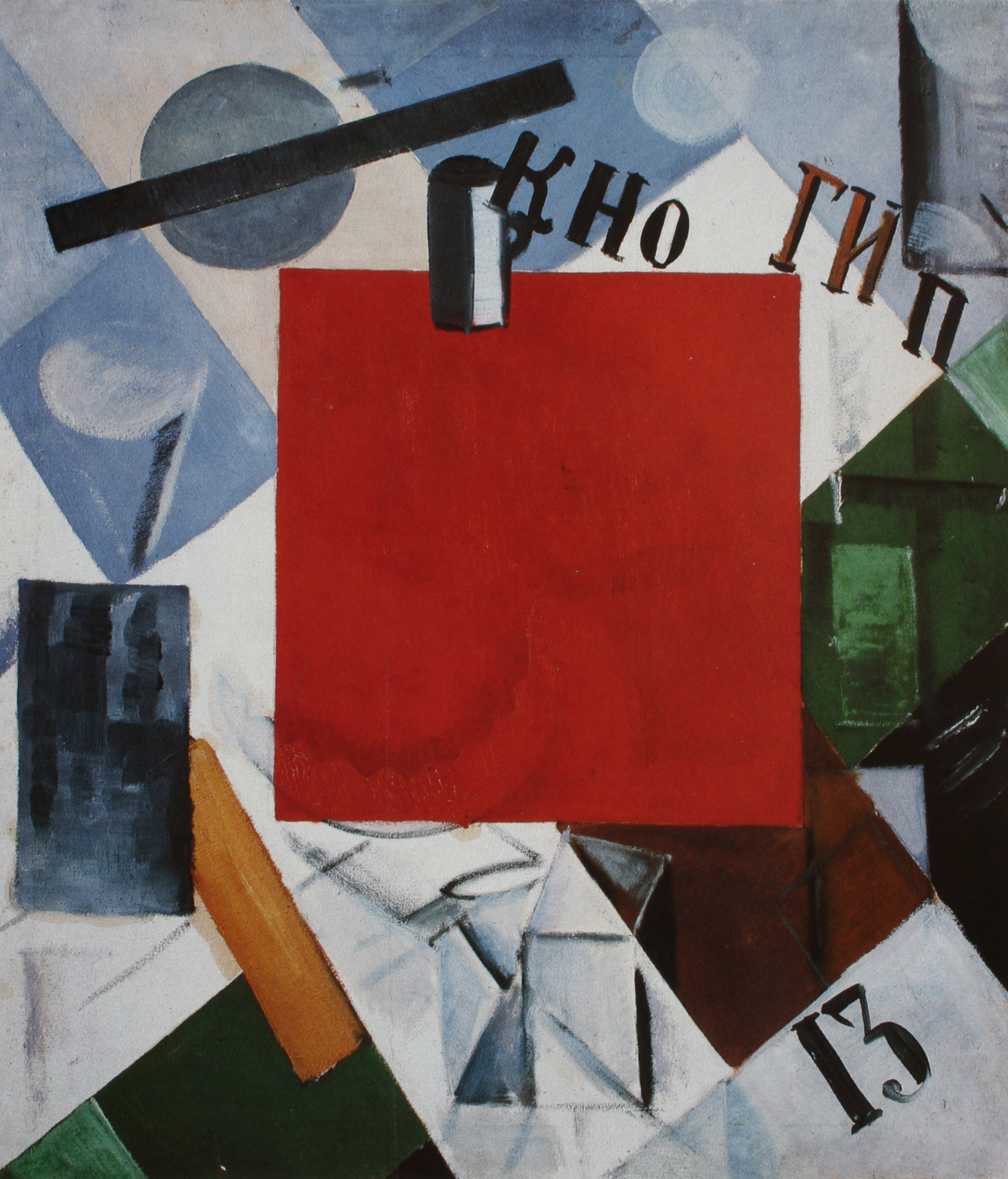
Composition #1

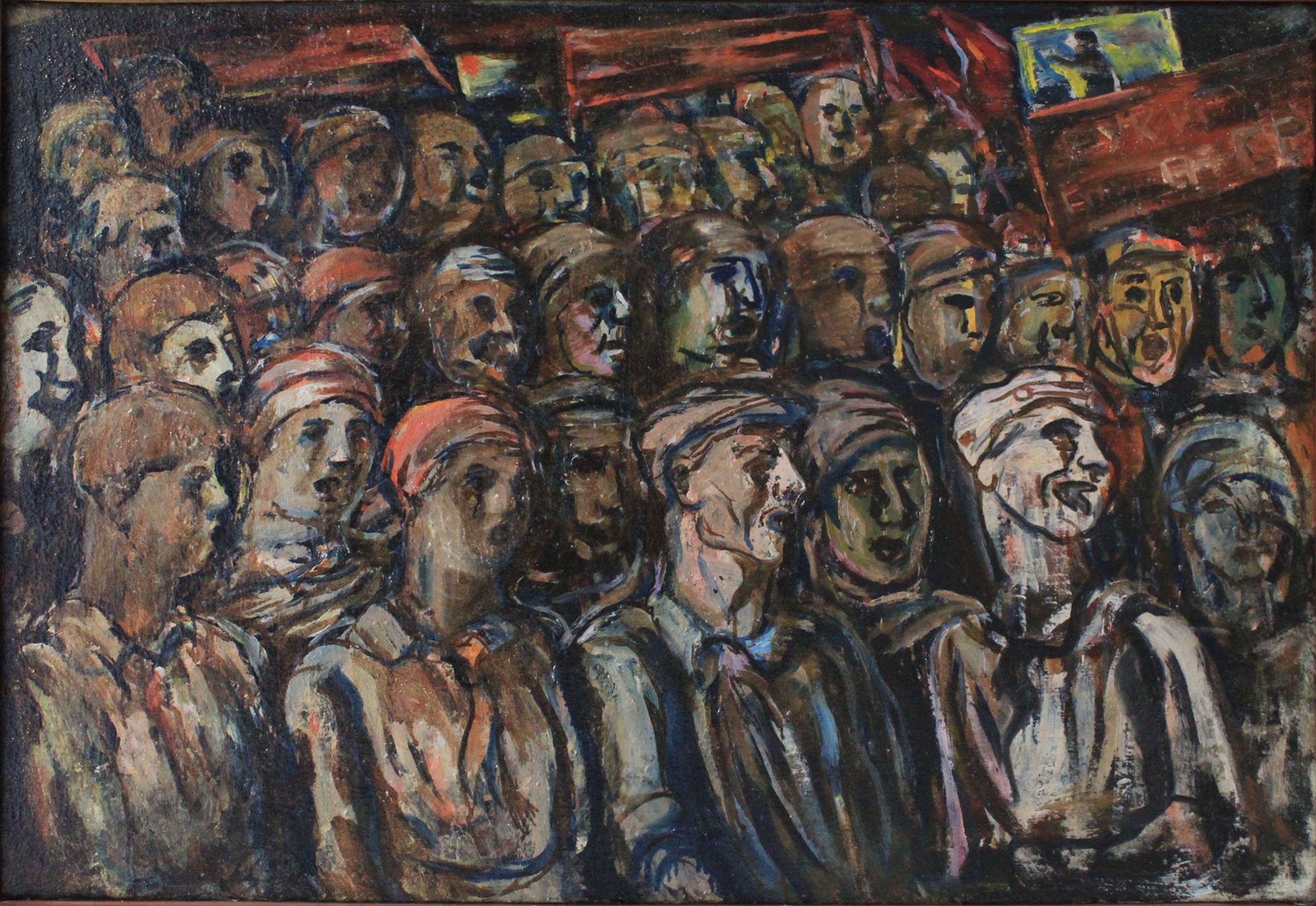
Demonstration (1928)

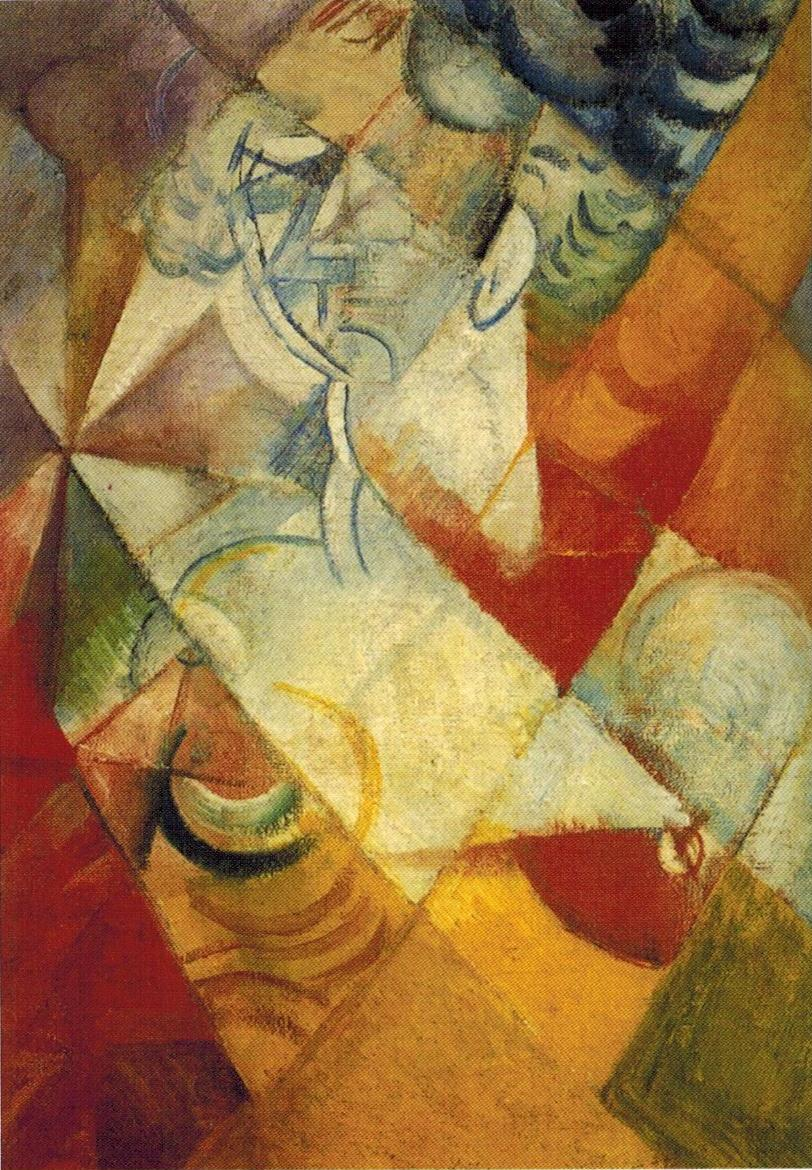
Portrait

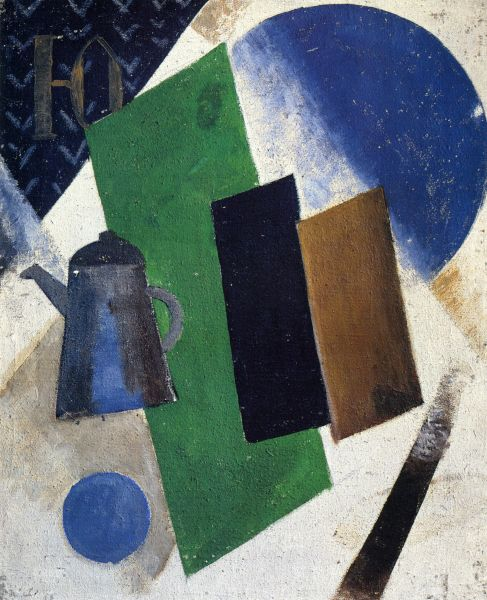
Composition with the Letter "Ю"
