= Moisey Feigin =

Soviet and Russian artist

Moses (Moisey) Aleksandrovich Feigin (Russian: Моисей Александрович Фейгин; 23 October 1904 – 26 April 2008) was a Soviet and Russian artist of Jewish descent. Feigin held the Guinness World Record for the world's oldest professional working artist until his death in 2008 at the age of 103. A centenarian, he was considered the last representative of the Russian avant-garde art.

Feigin was born on 23 October 1904. He was the last surviving member of the Bubnovyi Valet, an art group that was active during the early 20th century. His last personal art exhibition was held from 27 April until 10 May 2007 at the Central House of Artists in Moscow, Russia. Feigin was 102 years and 199 days old at the time that this last exhibition opened. The Guinness World Records officially certified Feigin as the world's oldest professional working artist in February 2008 based on this art exhibition.

Feigin died on 26 April 2008 in Moscow.

== See also ==
- Boris Efimov
