= Kuprin =

Kuprin (Russian: Куприн), female Kuprina is a Russian surname. Notable people with the surname include:

- Aleksandr Kuprin (1870–1938), Russian writer
- Alexander V. Kuprin (1880–1960), Russian painter
- Ksenia Kuprina

== See also ==
- 3618 Kuprin, a small object in the asteroid belt
