= Xan Krohn =

Norwegian expressionist painter (1882–1959)

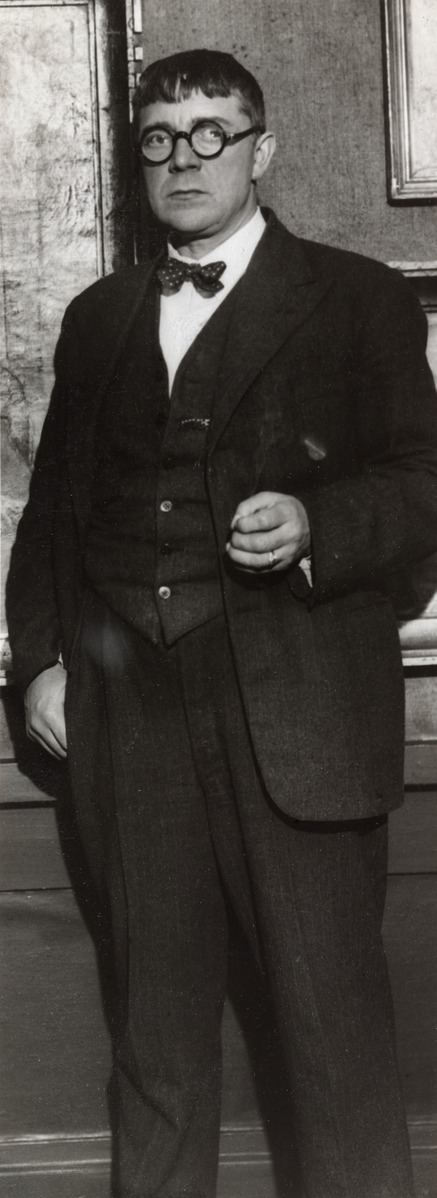
- Xan Krohn, 1930s
- Born: Christian Cornelius Krohn; 15 June 1882; Bergen, Norway
- Died: 30 October 1959 (aged 77); Oslo, Norway
- Known for: Painting
- Movement: Cubism, Expressionism

Xan Krohn (born Christian Cornelius Krohn) (June 15, 1882, Bergen – October 30, 1959, Oslo) was a Norwegian artist who worked for many years in Russia. He summed up his life’s experience in the book “En vagabonds vandring på jorden” (“A vagabond’s journey on earth”) which he published in 1950 in Oslo.

== Biography ==
He studied painting at the Den kongelige tegneskole (Royal Drawing School) in 1899-1902, and from 1905 at the Russian Academy of Arts in St. Petersburg under Russia's most significant realist painter Ilya Repin. In 1906 he went to the academy of Simon Hollósy (1857–1918) in Munich. In 1907, he moved to Paris and began studying at the Colarossi and simultaneously studied at the Grande Chaumière Academy. While studying at the Grande Chaumière Academy, he met the Russian-Swedish aristocrat, artist Julia de Holmberg (1882-1956), born in Kursk. Before Christmas 1907, Xan Kron married Julia.

In the fall of 1908, the Krohn couple settled in Kyiv. Krohn and Julia jointly participated in exhibitions in Kyiv and Odessa.

During his stay in Russia he was associated with the Mir iskusstva ("World of Art") and Knave of Diamonds ("Бубновый валет") movements.

Krohn participated in Knave of Diamonds Second exhibition in 1912 (with 7 canvases) and then in the Fourth exhibition in 1916 (with 20 canvases), becoming the only foreign participant due to the war time restrictions on the movements of canvases and people.

Till the end of 1917 he lived mostly in Russia, but the revolution of 1917 caused Krohn take his family and move to Oslo. From Oslo Krohn made several sea journeys around the world, visiting numerous countries in Africa and Asia, such travels becoming a part of his life. He worked as a decorative painter at the National Theatre (Oslo) and also worked as a stonemason. In 1925 he made the altarpiece in Totenviken Church. It consists of two parts: a glass window, which depicts "Jesus blesses the little children", and a fresco entitled "The institution of the Lord's Supper".

His art bears traces of most of the trends of the time. His main work revolved around landscapes, but he also created nudes, portraits and, like his spouse, flower paintings. He made photographs and collages.

While he worked in the Russian Empire, he had solo exhibitions in Odesa, St. Petersburg, Kiev and Riga. He has also painted frescoes now stored in the Georgian Museum in Tbilisi.

In Norway he exhibited with all major art associations and at the annual Autumn Exhibition in Oslo in 1950-1958.

== Family ==
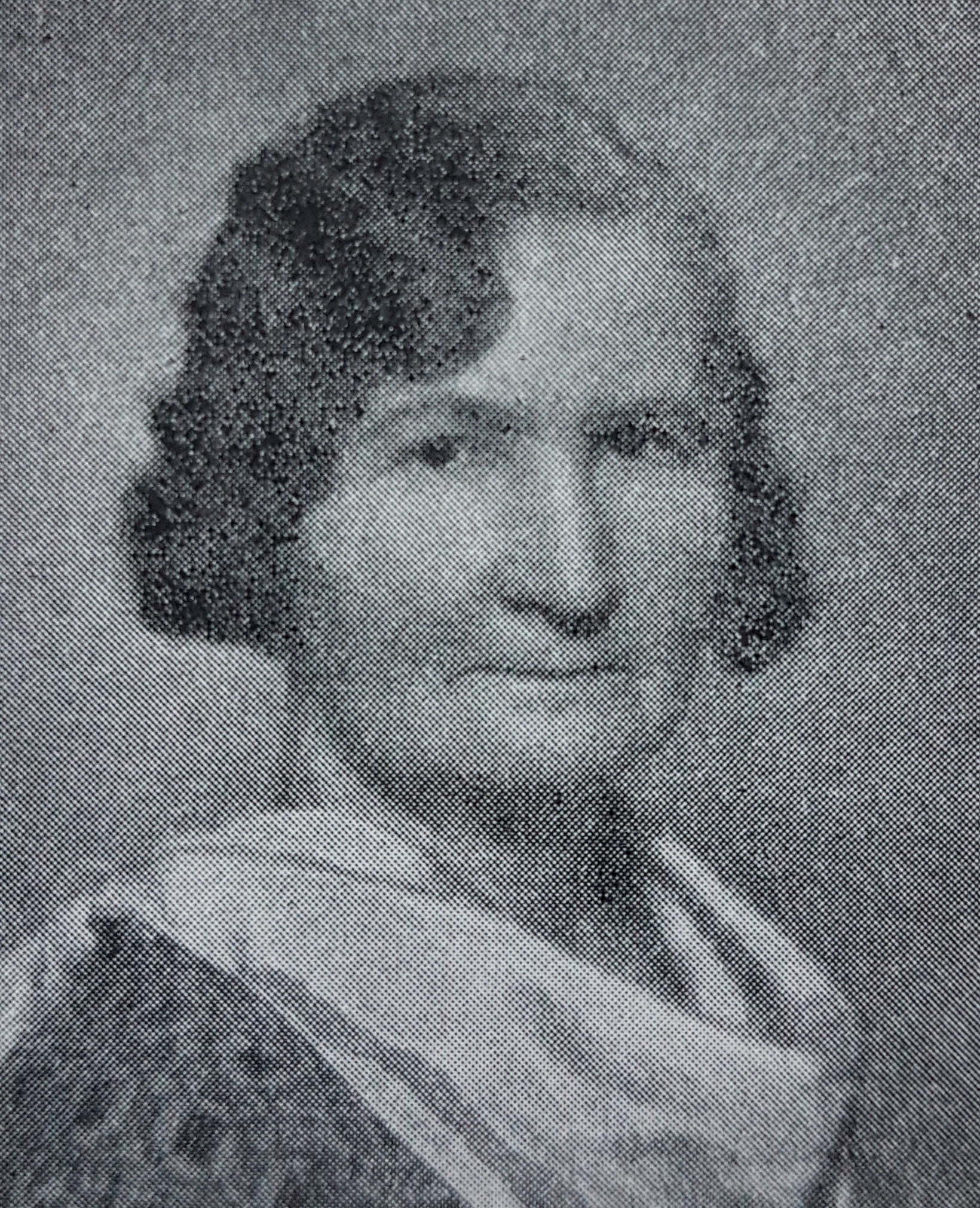
Julie de Holmberg-Krohn

Xan was the son of Conrad Peter Krohn (1845–) and Ingeborg Severine Christine Krüger (1850–1910). His father was a ship captain from Farsund. His parents divorced and his mother emigrated to the United States in 1885 and his father emigrated separately to the United States in 1889.

In 1907 he married Russian noblewoman and artist Julie de Holmberg (1882–1956) from Kursk and they settled in Kiev.

Later, with the Orthodox priest's daughter Sonja Trezvinskaja he had a son Oleg Krohn (1914–44),. In 1923 Oleg together with his mother left the USSR for Norway to join his father and also became a Norwegian artist.

Oleg's daughter Sonja Krohn (born 1941), Xan's granddaughter, also became an artist in Norway.

== Literature ==
- Sigrid Rømcke Thue, Xan Krohn i Norsk kunstnerleksikon, bind 2, s. 658–659.
- Kari Lien, Norges glemte avantgardist i Morgenbladet 18. januar 2008
- Krohn, Xan. En vagabonds vandring på jorden. 1950, Oslo, Gyldendal.
- Поспелов Г. Г. «Бубновый валет»: Примитив и городской фольклор в московской живописи 1910-х годов.
- Exhibitions of Soviet visual art: reference book in 5 volumes. Moscow, Sovetsky khudozhnik Editions, 1965-1981. - Vol. 1: 1917-1932 гг. – pp. 8–12. (Выставки советского изобразительного искусства : справочник : [в 5 томах]. – М.: Советский художник, 1965-1981. - Т. 1: 1917-1932 гг. – С. 8-12)
- Balakhovskaya Faina, Gumilina Antonina // Encyclopedia of Russian Avant-garde: Fine Arts. Architecture / Authors-compilers V. I. Rakitin, A. D. Sarabyanov; Scientific editor A. D. Sarabyanov. Moscow, RA, Global Expert & Service Team Editions, 2013. — Vol. I: Biographies. — pp. 215–216. — ISBN 978-5-902801-11-5. (Балаховская Фаина Михайловна, Гумилина Антонина Михайловна // Энциклопедия русского авангарда: Изобразительное искусство. Архитектура / Авторы-составители В. И. Ракитин, А. Д. Сарабьянов; Научный редактор А. Д. Сарабьянов. — Moscow, RA, Global Expert & Service Team Editions, 2013. — Vol. I: Biographies. — pp. 215–216. — ISBN 978-5-902801-11-5).
- Северюхин Д.Я., Лейкинд О.Л. Золотой век художественных объединений в России и СССР (1820-1932). Справочник. Санкт-Петербург, издательство «Чернышев», 1992. ISBN 5-85555-004-4. (Severyukhin D.Ya., Leykind O.L. The Golden Age of Artistic Associations in Russia and the USSR (1820-1932). Handbook. St. Petersburg, Chernyshev Publishing House, 1992. ISBN 5-85555-004-4)
