= Donkey's Tail =

Russian artistic group

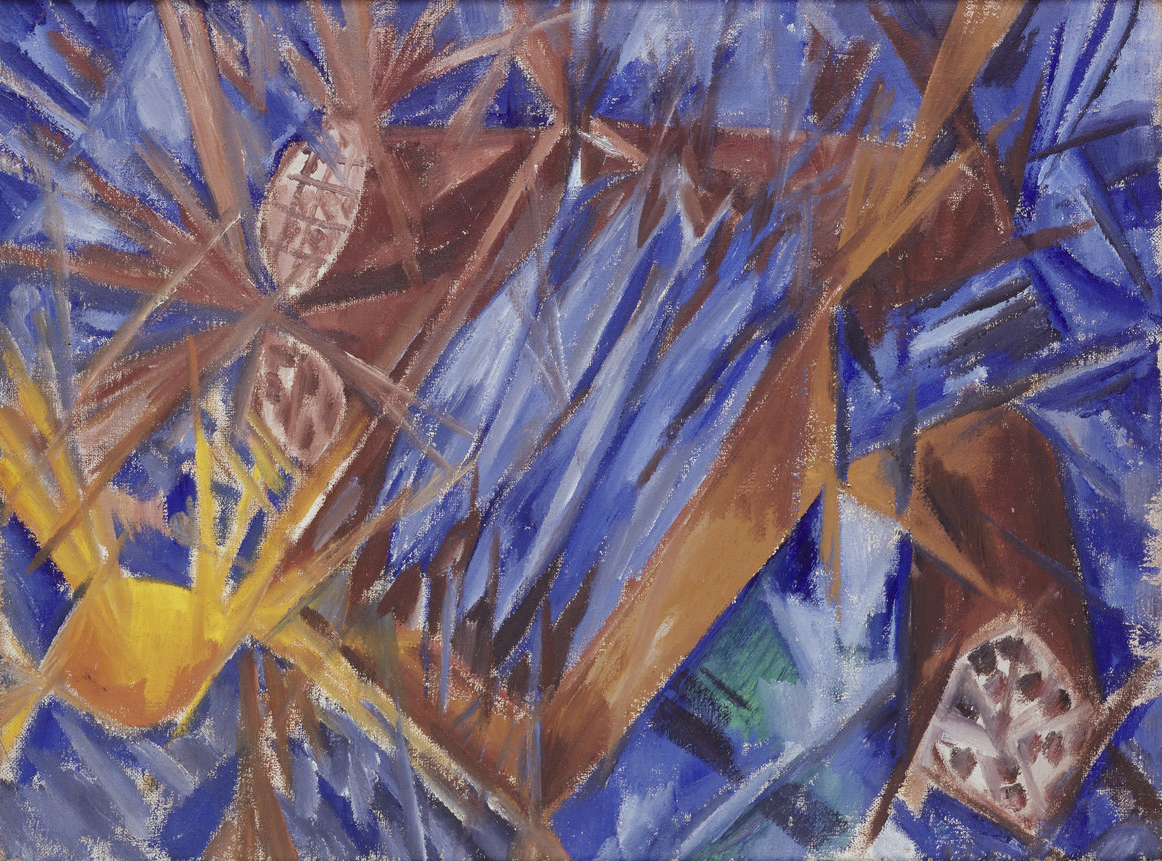
Larionov, Rayonist Sausages and Mackerel, 1912)

Donkey's Tail (Russian: Ослиный хвост, Romanized: Osliniy khvost) was a Russian artistic group created from the most radical members of the Jack of Diamonds group. The group included such painters as: Mikhail Larionov (inventor of the name), Natalia Goncharova, Kazimir Malevich, Marc Chagall, and Aleksandr Shevchenko. The group, according to Gino Severini in his autobiography, was Futurist; it is known that, even if they were not, they were certainly influenced by the Cubo-Futurism movement. The only exhibition of the group took place in Moscow in 1912 (notable for being the start of Malevich's entry into his Cubo-Futurist phase), and in 1913, the group fell apart.

== Larionov's Invention of Knave of Diamonds ==
Aspiring to establish their leadership within the Russian avant-garde, Mikhail Larionov and Natalia Goncharova became key organizers of several avant-garde art groups of the most radical leaning. In 1907, together with brothers David Burliuk and Vladimir Burliuk, they created the group "Venok-Stefanos". When "Venok-Stefanos" depleted its potential, Larionov decided to consolidate his resources with other radical avant-garde groups - with "New Munich Art Association" of Wassily Kandinsky and the group of Russian Cezannists and Fauvists led by Pyotr Konchalovsky, Ilya Mashkov and Aristarkh Lentulov who had been expelled from Moscow School of Painting, Sculpture and Architecture in 1909 among 63 other students for radical art inclinations that unnerved their conservative educators.

They united into a group with the provocative name Knave of Diamonds, which was invented by Mikhail Larionov (later, Aristarkh Lentulov claimed in his memoirs that they had jointly invented this name with Larionov), which in Russian tradition meant “rebellion, disobedience, challenge, audacity and energy of youth”, a sheer break with everything that existed in the realm of painting of that time. According to Alexander V. Kuprin, Mikhail Larionov also valued the connotations which the notion ”valet de carreau” had in France since its first appearing in Molière's "Le Dépit amoureux” in 1656, implying “swindler, rogue”, since it would subtly emphasize the mockingly daring attitude of modern Russian “knaves of diamonds” to the established art schools.

== Larionov breaks out and invents Donkey's Tail ==
However, the salon at Levisson House in Moscow which was hired for the “Knave of Diamonds” inaugural first exhibition, turned out to be rather small to offer ample space for all 38 participants. It became especially so since Ilya Mashkov brought in a giant self-portrait of himself and Pyotr Konchalovsky, causing Mikhail Larionov's ire, who complained that this huge canvas took the place intended for his own 3, or even 4 paintings.

Mikhail Larionov who grew increasingly irritated at the fact that the public and the critics were paying increased attention to the pictures of Pyotr Konchalovsky and Ilya Mashkov, to the detriment of Larionov's own canvases and those of Natalia Goncharova, while he was the very man who had invented the Exhibition's concept and coined the very name of “Knave of Diamonds”, used this as the pretext to stir up open conflict with the Konchalovsky-Mashkov-Lentulov group. On December 20, 1910 Larionov and several of his followers entered the exhibition and began to demonstratively remove their paintings from the walls. Lentulov managed to settle the conflict, but on January 3, 1911, two weeks before the closing of the exhibition, Mikhail Larionov announced in the press that he had already broke with the “Knave of Diamonds” and was preparating a new exhibition of his new group in the coming season of 1911/1912, that will bear the name Donkey's Tail.

== Donkey's Tail Name Etymology ==
The name "Donkey's Tail" was selected since it was associated with an incident at the Paris Salon des Indépendants in March 1910, when a group of mystifiers, having previously "warmed up" the public with manifestos of the non-existent “artist Joachim-Raphaël Boronali” (anagram of French word “aliboron” — donkey), exhibited an abstract painting "And the Sun Fell Asleep over the Adriatic", supposedly painted by the tail of a donkey Lolo owned by Frederic Gerard - the owner of cafe “Le Lapin Agile” at Montmartre. The Russian avant-garde artists liked this incident. The famed realist Ilya Repin also liked it and, in his polemical manner, used the details of the Parisian incident in his critical article about the French and Russian innovative artists presented in St. Petersburg at the First "Salon" of Izdebsky, writing: "They tied a brush to a donkey's tail, put a palette with paints and a canvas under the tail. They fed the donkey something tasty: it wagged its tail with pleasure, and a painting by Cézanne appeared."

Mikhail Larionov stated: "The gutter press made a fuss about this incident. Now we are picking the gauntlet. The spectators believe that we paint with a donkey's tail - so let us be a donkey's tail for them."

But despite the fact that Larionov announced the upcoming “Donkey's Tail” exhibition during the first inaugural exhibition of the Knave of Diamonds in January 1911, the preparations for the exhibition dragged on for more than a year and were not yet finished. As a result, the Knave of Diamonds managed to prepare its exhibition first, making it on 23 Jan — 26 Feb 1912. Because of this, Larionov had no choice but to make a premature propaganda salvo against the Knave of Diamonds group on December 11, 1911 in the newspaper "Voice of Moscow", where Larionov toppled the achievements of his recent comrades, calling them depreciatively "Repin-style realists", recalling that it was he who invented the name "Knave of Diamonds ", and expressed the credo of his new group: "The public already recognizes "Knave of Diamonds ". While we are absolutely free. We were "Knave of Diamonds ". This year we will be "Donkey's Tail", next year we will turn out as "Target". We are not bound - not even by a name. Always young and independent."

However, in order to get ahead of the Knave of Diamonds, Larionov hastily prepared a trial mini-exhibition of the formative Donkey's Tail group in St. Petersburg from January 4 to February 12, 1912 - as part of a larger “3rd exhibition of the Union of Youth”. His group participated with less than half of its listed members: Natalia Goncharova, Mikhail Larionov, Kazimir Malevich, Alexey Morgunov, Vladimir Tatlin, Artur Fonvizin, Aleksandr Shevchenko. Conservative St. Petersburg critics met the new Moscow group with indignation and sarcasm: "Donkey's Tail", this is something incredible! A kind of a mental asylum."

"Here is a complete mockery of both art and the public. And what pathetic mischief had forced these unknown youths to choose such a name and stand under the flag of a donkey's tail!"

== First Donkey's Tail Exhibition in Moscow in March 11 – April 8, 1912 ==
The first trial mini-exhibition of the "Donkey's Tail" in St. Petersburg paved the way for the main "Donkey's Tail" exhibition of 1912, where Mikhail Larionov was supposed to give the principal fight to the Knave of Diamonds. However, Larionov failed to organize his exhibition simultaneously with the Knave of Diamonds exhibition which ended on 26 Feb 1912, so that he could compete with it face to face, and exhibited only on 11 March - half a month later.

The "Donkey's Tail" exhibition was held in the exhibition hall of the School of Painting, Sculpture and Architecture (Myasnitskaya St., 21), and showed canvases by Mikhail Larionov and Natalia Goncharova, Kazimir Malevich, Vladimir Tatlin, Aleksandr Shevchenko, Marc Chagall, Artur Fonvizin. Larionov also invited Olga Rozanova, Pavel Filonov, Ilya Shkolnik.

The first "Donkey's Tail" exhibition occurred under unfavorable circumstances for Larionov and his group due to the significant success of the "Knave of Diamonds " exhibition, since the Knave of Diamonds not only presented their best canvases, but also acquainted the public with the latest achievements of European painting - works by French Cubists, including Pablo Picasso, Georges Braque, Henri Matisse, André Derain, Robert Delaunay, abstract "improvisations" by Wassily Kandinsky and Germans from Der Blaue Reiter - August Macke, Franz Marc and Marianne von Werefkin.

To counter this preponderance, Larionov and Goncharova made a demarche that allowed them to seize the initiative in the struggle for public interest before the opening of their exhibition. On February 12, 1912 they stormed into the Polytechnic Museum, where Knave of Diamonds under Pyotr Konchalovsky were having debates "On Modern Art", and Larionov attacked them with the provocative statement that the Knave of Diamonds were conservative and backward. After the audience burst with indignation, Mikhail Larionov shouted: "The French are great. The Jacks of Diamonds merely mimick the French and me!" and left, hitting the lectern so that it cracked. This stirred sensation in the newspapers, and the spectators became eager to see what Donkey's Tail was to offer.

The "Donkey's Tail" exhibition was centered around the paintings of the group's leader Larionov, executed in the style of neo-primitivism, with numerous scenes from the life of ordinary soldiers (as Larionov had just completed his annual military training), and by Natalia Goncharova - dominated by the peasant life scenes and religious themes.

Goncharova's paintings devoted to religious themes caused the most scandalous reaction, since they were a breach with the strict Orthodox canons, thus part of her canvases on religious themes were removed from the exhibition on the eve of its opening at the request of Censorship committee. Among the banned works was the tetraptych "Four Evangelists" by Goncharova.

The exhibition was visited by circa ten thousand people, fourteen items were sold, but the reviews were dominated by disappointment, regret and irony. "From the "Donkey's Tail" exhibition one could expect some kind of crazy innovation, and unusual boldness. But time quickly dulls the superficial sharpness of novelty, and the title of the exhibition, as well as its content, no longer seem bold and provocative to anyone,” wrote Alexander Koyransky in “Utro Rossii”

Famous symbolist poet and critic Maximilian Voloshin noted that “the public was disappointed, as it had become accustomed to scandals and expected more, and the Burliuk brothers know how to stun - but this time, they didn't. And despite Larionov's haughty phrase that "You are my epigones", which he hurled at Knave of Diamonds, in the general public's opinion it was Knave of Diamonds's David Burliuk who turned out to be more radical and more to the left than Larionov. The Muscovites found that "Donkey's Tail" was not up to its name, and for a good reason reproached the artists for self-praise.”

In his analysis, watercolor artist and critic Maximilian Voloshin observed that the Donkey's Tail exhibition was "more daring and audacious in words than in sheer painting," describing the artworks as quick, intentionally rough sketches that teased the viewer's expectations. He noted that the artists shared a distinct focus on everyday subjects, such as soldiers, barbers, and sex workers, and often selected their color palettes to match their subject matter. According to Voloshin, by using hues reminiscent of pomade for hairdressers or mud and leather for military life, the painters successfully captured the atmosphere of their themes.

== Differences between Donkey's Tail and Knave of Diamonds ==
For the general public, the difference between the "Donkey's Tail" and the "Knave of Diamonds " was elusive. Many professional artists and critics, too, did not perceive any essential difference - or down-graded it to a struggle of ambitions and the sheer desire to stun the public.

However, the statements and the pictures of the artists reveal that dissimilarity between them might be attributed to relevant philosophical and conceptual reasons.

The Knave of Diamonds primarily adhered to the constructive and plastic principles of Cezannism, and used the painting language and techniques of Cézanne mainly for their self-expression, using a limited set of forms for it (still-life, architectural landskape). This this “Knave of Diamonds” copied Pablo Picasso's approach, who time after time reproduced the same subjects and forms of still lifes with a wine bottle and a tobacco pack, still life with a guitar, a harlequin, demonstrating the changing imprint of his personality and technique on them.

Mikhail Larionov, Natalia Goncharova and Donkey's Tail adhered rather to "neo-primitivism" and folk art than to Cézanne whom they found “too refined”, and they sought to depict, first of all, “people's life” – the life of peasants, ordinary soldiers and poor city dwellers, as well as what they considered to be topical for the Russian people at a given time. In this regard, they paradoxically came close to the realist Peredvizhniki philosophy.

They also differed in their attitude to the West: the Knave of Diamonds were definitely European-oriented, and it was no coincidence that they were called “the main Russian Frenchmen”. Therefore, there was such an abundance of the best Western artists at all Knave of Diamonds exhibitions, which emphasized the organic relationship between Russian and European avant-garde.

On the contrary, Mikhail Larionov and Donkey's Tail fundamentally rejected the influence of the West on Russian national painting, declaring that the it was “more inclined to borrow from Eastern sources, from Chinese popular prints, sometimes Japanese, from Persian miniatures, Indian and Tatar sources. It was no coincidence that when the founder of the Futurist movement Filippo Tommaso Marinetti came to Russia in January–February of 1914, Mikhail Larionov was grotesquely unwelcome to him, bad-mouthing Marinetti as a "futurist of the second freshness", and threatening to "throw rotten eggs at this renegade, to pour sour milk over him" during Marinetti's lectures. Larionov, who, together with Natalia Goncharova and other artists preached the new-fangled "Rayonism", considered Marinetti's ideas to be outdated and therefore unnecessary.

When Larionov categorically stated that "Marinetti, who's preaching old nonsense, is banal and vulgar, suitable only for the common audience and the dumbest of followers", and likewise recognized no critics or teachers in the art field, he was in fact defending the absolute independence and originality of Russian art - and his own unique place in it.

Ironically, as Larionov's group was deliberately anti-Western and pro-Eastern, the contemporary Russian critics stubbornly characterized their work as “an ugly copy of the Western model,” “a miserable echo of the rebellions and frenzies of the Italian prophet Filippo Tommaso Marinetti”.

Even greater history's irony lies in the fact that since 1915, Mikhail Larionov and Natalia Goncharova had left Russia for good, never to return, and were completely engaged within the Western art scene which they so much pretended to despise and belittle. Larionov's period of making revolutions in art and inventing radical movements also proved to be quite short, lasting no more than five years - after he came to Europe and began working on Diaghilev's ballets, his manner entirely de-radicalized, becoming a blend of engrained realism with Russian folklore fairy-tale motives.

On the other hand, none of the Knave of Diamonds whom Mikhail Larionov so vehemently accused of mimicking Cézanne and European art styles, chose to emigrate, all remaining in the places where they had been born and grudgingly chameleoning toward Socialist realism which turned to be their survival kit in Stalin's hard times.

== From "Donkey's Tail" to "Target" and "Rayonism" ==
In the 1912/1913 season, the group no longer used the name "Donkey's Tail" at its exhibitions and staged "Target" («Мишень») exhibition in Moscow on March 24 – April 7, 1913. "Target" showed works by Larionov and Goncharova, Aleksandr Shevchenko, Mikhaïl Le Dentu, Sergey Romanovich, and Kasimir Malevich who chose to become member of the “Union of Youth”, but continued to collaborate with Larionov's group.

In the preface to the catalogue of "Target" exhibition, Larionov wrote: "Target is the last exhibition from the cycle conceived in 1911: Knave of Diamonds (the first exhibition, not the society). Donkey's Tail. Target. Under all those names, a group of artists acts to implement the views that they profess at the moment. The change in the names of the exhibitions depended on the fact that each exhibition put forward new artistic tasks, which was the initial plot".

The exhibition catalogue also specified the group's new direction: "We have created our own style - Rayonism, which deals with spatial forms and makes painting self-sufficient and living only by its own laws". The expanded concept of this movement was formulated in M. Larionov's brochure "Rayonism" (Moscow, 1913), published for the opening of the "Target" exhibition.

In July 1913, Larionov published brochure "Donkey's Tail and Target", with a collective manifesto signed by the updated composition of the group which was now called "The Rayonnists and the “Buduchniki” (The Futurists)".

Larionov's group came to the “Target” exhibition in the process of its own disintegration, which began with demonstrative break of Artur Fonvizin after Larionov exhibited his works at "Donkey's Tail" 1912 exhibition without expilict consent of the author.

Artur Fonvizin was among “the most original and ambitious artists who did not want to put up with the despotism of the group's leader Larionov, who only wanted to dominate all the exhibitions he organized together with Natalia Goncharova”.

The less self-sufficient painters like Victor Barthe, Mikhaïl Le Dentu and Moris Fabbri refrained from breaking with Larionov for the sake of participating in joint exhibitions, “despite all their dissatisfaction with M. Larionov's actions.

Just before the “Target” exhibition, Kazimir Malevich, Vladimir Tatlin and Aleksey Morgunov (author of Knave of Diamonds logo in 1910) chose to be accepted as members of the “Union of Youth” («Союз Молодежи»), but if Malevich continued to collaborate with Larionov's group, occupying an “isolated position” in it, then Tatlin and Morgunov broke fully with their former allies, officially joining the “Knave of Diamonds” society on January 13, 1913.

== Last Exhibition — «No. 4. Futurists, Rayonists and Primitive», 1914 ==
The exhibition name is explained by the fact that this was the fourth of the exhibitions organized by Larionov - after the “Knave of Diamonds“, «Donkey's Tail» and «Target».

Larionov's concluding exhibition was staged March 23 – April 23, 1914 in the premises of the Society of Art Lovers. From the old group of Larionov's like-minded adherers only Natalia Goncharova, Aleksandr Shevchenko, Mikhaïl Le Dentu and Kirill Zdanevich remained. The exhibition was aimed at renewing the group by attracting young new forces, such as Vasily Chekrygin, Ivan Bobkov, Timofey Bogomazov, Vasily Kamensky, but eventually turned out to be Larionov's farewell to Russia and its artistic life.

The exhibition's centerpiece were the “Portrait of Larionov” by Goncharova, and Cubist portraits by Vasily Kamensky and Mikhaïl Le Dentu. Alexandra Exter and V. Shekhtel also participated.

The “No. 4” exhibition becoming an unexpected Larionov's farewell to Russia and its artistic life was determined by Sergei Diaghilev and World War I. During the “No. 4” exhibition, Natalia Goncharova was working on stage decorations for the Golden Cockerel ballet to be staged by Sergei Diaghilev in Paris. After Diaghilev's invitation, Goncharova in May 1914 went to Paris to prepare the ballet decorations, accompanied by Larionov. They stayed in Paris until World War I broke out. Since Mikhail Larionov was liable for military service, he immediately returned to Russia in August 1914 and was sent to Eastern Prussia, but after a month of fighting was severely wounded and sent to hospital in Moscow, and demobilized in December, 1914. When Sergei Diaghilev learned about it, he started bombarding Goncharova with telegrams urging her to come to him in Italy and then Switzerland to work on Diaghilev's Russian ballets. Goncharova told Diaghilev that she'll go to him only if Mikhail Larionov will be also summoned. When Diaghilev found the money to pay for their expenses, Goncharova and Larionov in July 1915 went to Diaghilev's rented villa in Ouchy near Lausanne to work on “Les Noces” and «Liturgy» (Natalia Goncharova) and “Soleil de Nuit” («Полуночное солнце») by Nikolai Rimsky-Korsakov (Mikhail Larionov).

The journey of Mikhail Larionov and Natalia Goncharova to Switzerland in July 1915 turned out to be a “one way ticket”, since they never put their feet on Russian soil after that, becoming French citizens and residing until their final days in Paris.

== Gallery ==
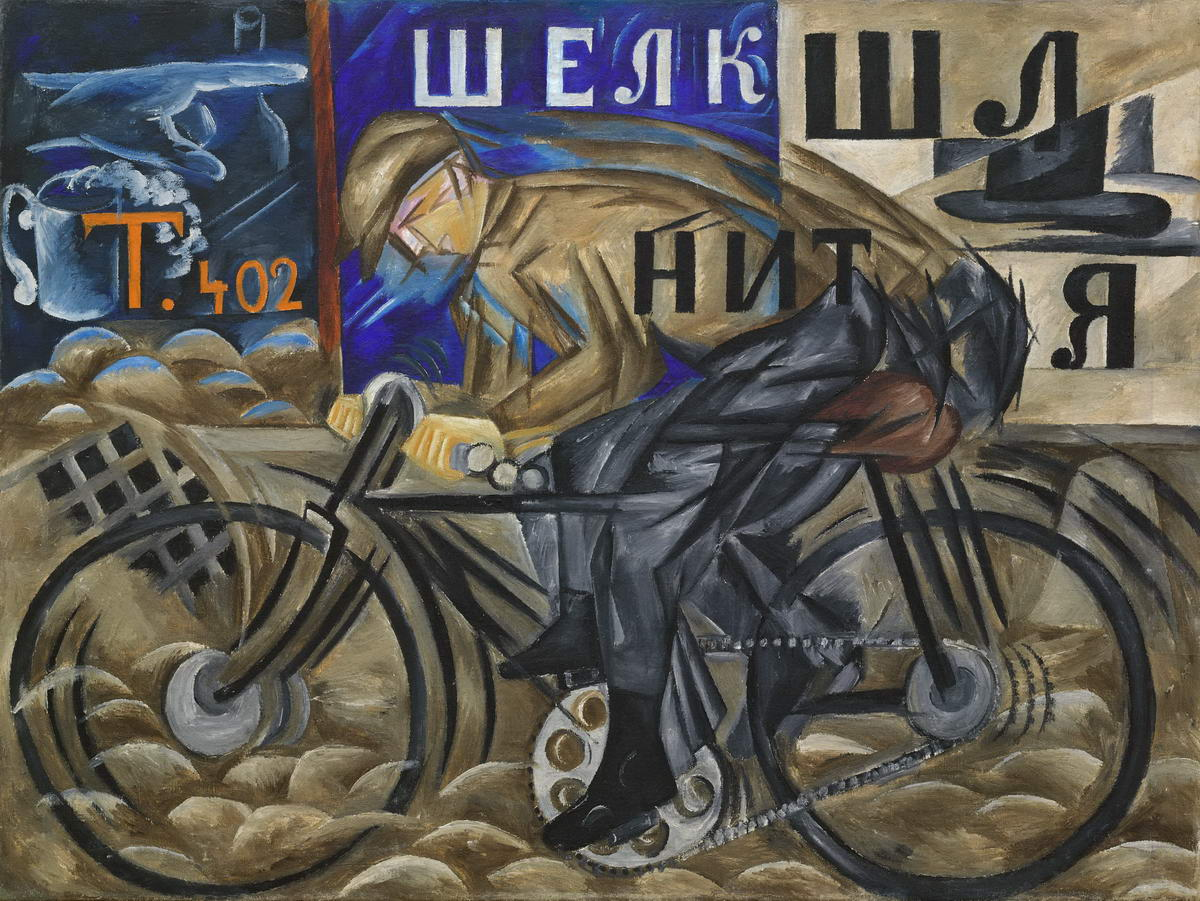
Natalia Goncharova, Cyclist, 1913

Marc Chagall, I and the Village, 1911

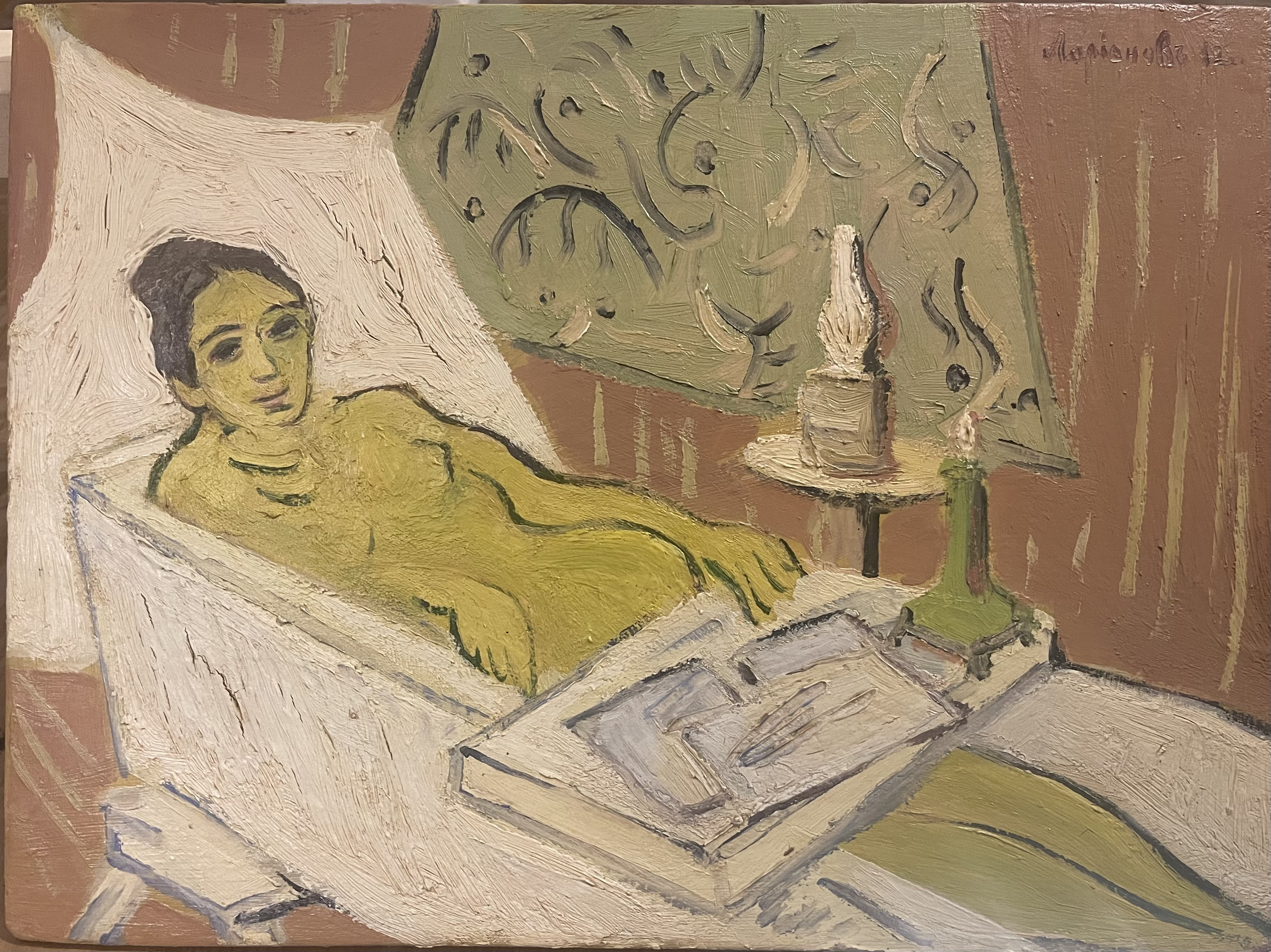
Mikhail Larionov, ‘’Study of the woman’’,1912

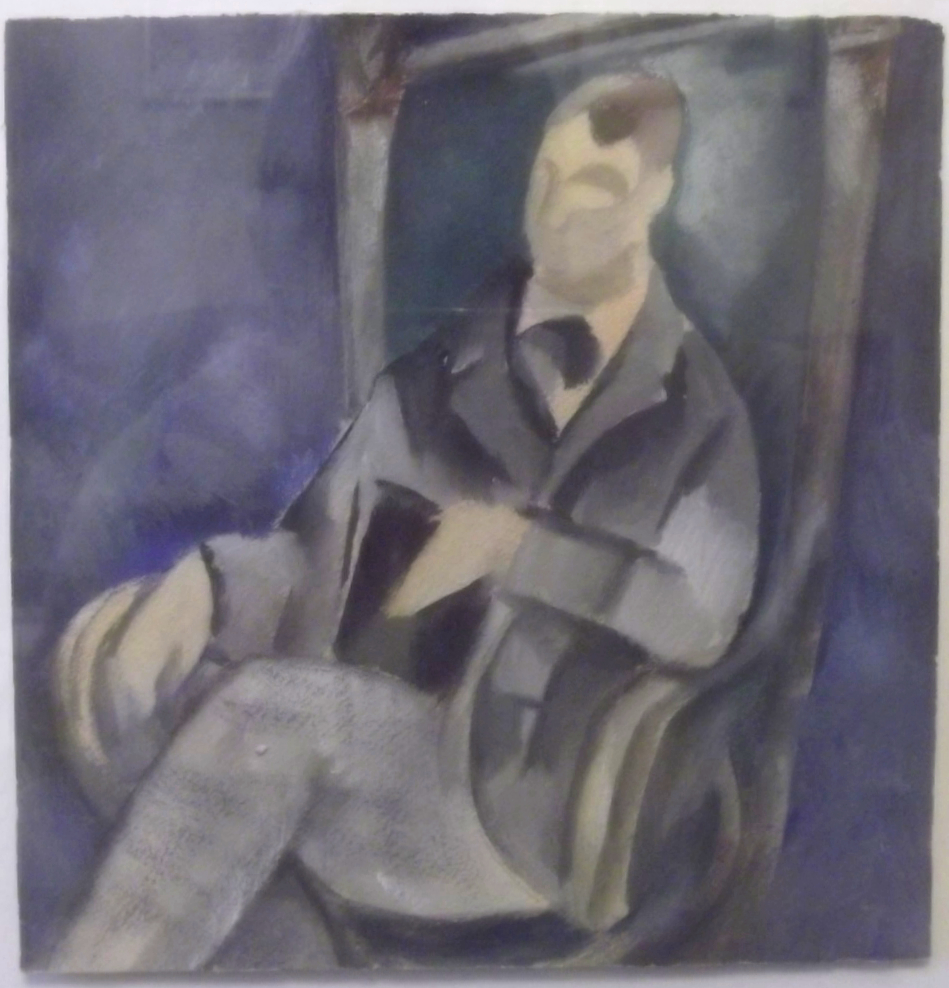
Aleksandr Shevchenko, ‘’Cubist Portrait of Man in Chair‘’, 1914

== Bibliography ==
- Voloshin Лики творчества (Faces of creativity) - Leningrad: Nauka, 1988. - pp. 287–289.
- Pospelov, G. Бубновый валет (Jack of Diamonds) - Moscow: Soviet artist, 1990. - ISBN 5-269-00079-2 .
