= Marczak =

Marczak is a surname of Polish origin. Ukrainian equivalent: Marchak. Notable people with the surname include:

- Michał Marczak (born 1982), Polish director and cinematographer
- Ryszard Marczak (born 1945), Polish Olympic athlete
- Sebastian Marczak (born 1983), Australian sprint canoeist
- Włodzimierz Marczak (1922–2016), Polish poet
