= Marsak =

Marsak is a surname. Notable people with the surname include:

- Kyrylo Marsak (born 2004), Ukrainian figure skater
- Leonard Marsak (1924–2013), American historian

== See also ==
- Marshak
