= Marchak =

Marchak (Ukrainian: Марчак) is a surname of Ukrainian origin. Polish equivalent: Marczak. Notable people with the surname include:

- Mandy Marchak (born 1984), Canadian rugby union player
- Mykola Marchak (1904–1938), Ukrainian politician

== See also ==
- Marshak
