= Aleksandr Shevchenko =

Russian painter

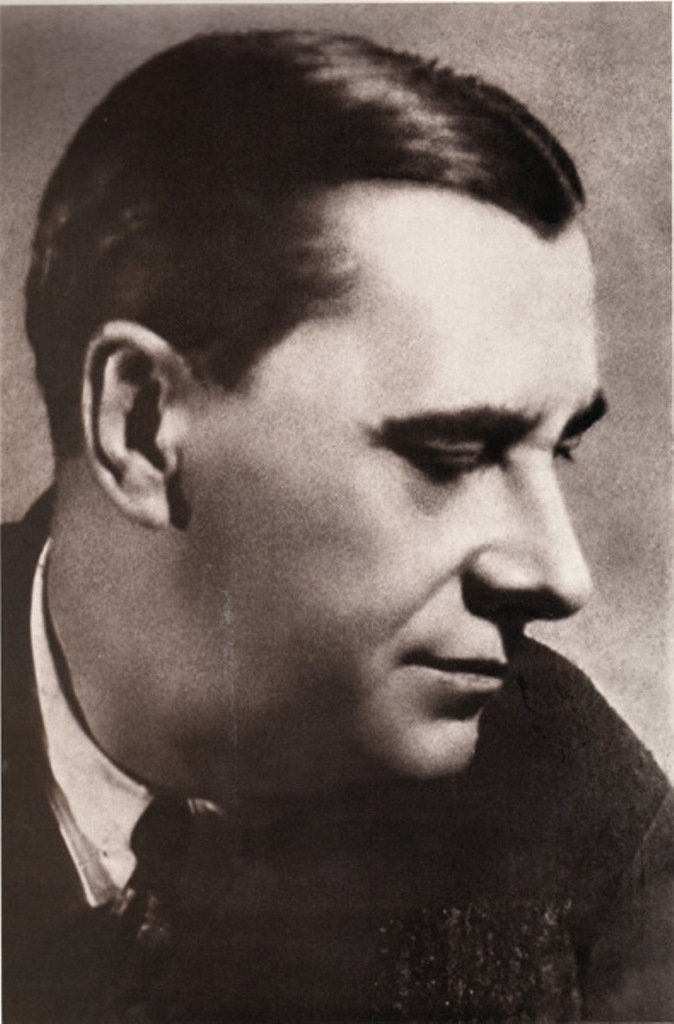
Aleksandr Shevchenko (c.1920)

Aleksandr Vasilievich Shevchenko also Oleksandr Vasyliovych Shevchenko (Ukrainian: Олександр Васильович Шевченко; 24 May 1882 – 28 August 1948) was a Ukrainian modernist painter and sculptor.

== Biography ==
He was born in Kharkiv. From 1890 to 1898, he took private drawing lessons from Dmytro Bezperchy and was employed by a workshop that produced theater sets. He then moved to Moscow and entered the Stroganov State Academy of Arts and Industry that he graduated from in 1907. That same year, he was admitted to the Moscow School of Painting, Sculpture and Architecture. From 1905 to 1906, he spent some time in Paris at the Académie Julian with Étienne Dinet and Jean-Paul Laurens. He also made the acquaintance of Mikhail Larionov and his followers. Under their influence, he worked in the Neo-Primitivist and, later, Rayonist styles. He was expelled from the school in 1909.

In 1910, Shevchenko joined the Oslini khvost circle (rus.: Ослиный хвост, eng.: Donkey's Tail; founded by Mikhail Larionov, producing a series of Rayonist works between 1913 and 1914 and writing two essays titled 'Neo-Primitivism: Its Theory and Its Capacities' (1913) and 'Principles of Cubism and Other Trends of Modern Art,' in which he delineated his view of modern painting as a combination of influences from Cézanne, Cubism, Futurism, and the popular forms of traditional art of the Russian Empire.

After 1911, he took part in group exhibitions by the Soyuz Molodyozhi (Union of Youth) in Saint Petersburg and participated in the first Moscow Salon. In 1912, he joined a major show by the Donkey's Tail. The following year, Shevchenko published two works of art theory: 'Neo-primitivism, its Theory, its Possibilities, its Achievements' and 'The Principles of Cubism and Other Trends in World Art of All Times and All People.' In these works, he defends the spontaneity of the folk art of the Russian empire and the lubok (a popular print style), and claims that it has "oriental" roots.

From 1913 till 1921, he participated in the exhibitions organized by the magazine The World of Art [Mir Iskusstva]. For a brief period, he painted in the Cubo-Futurist style. He was called for service by the army in 1914, but was not mobilized until 1917, shortly before the October Revolution. After that, he was attached to the "Plastic Arts Section", established by the new People's Commissariat for Education (NARKOMPROS) and was assigned to their college in Moscow, where he helped to direct the contemporary art workshop. Later, he taught at Vkhutemas and, typical for that time, was a member of numerous government committees. In 1920, he was named to the Institute of Artistic Culture.

Throughout the 1920s, Shevchenko was a regular participant in state-sponsored exhibitions; notably the First Russian Art Exhibition in Berlin (1922). During the 1930s, he travelled to Azerbaijan, Georgia and Kazakhstan, creating Orientalist works and gathering evidence for his theory on the origins of Russian art. The Tatar artist, Baqi Urmançe, was one of his students. After 1941, he headed the Department of Painting at the Moscow State Textile University. In his final years, he was accused of "Formalism", but was able to continue painting. He died in 1948 in Moscow.

== Selected works ==
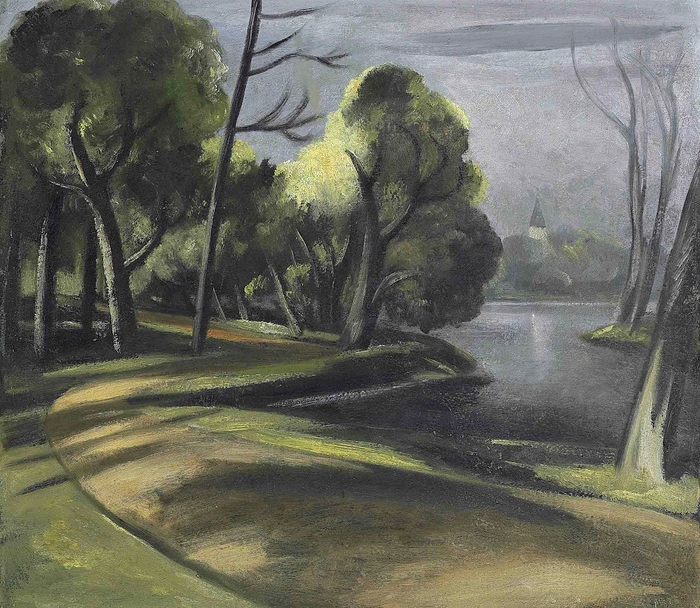
Landscape with a Lake

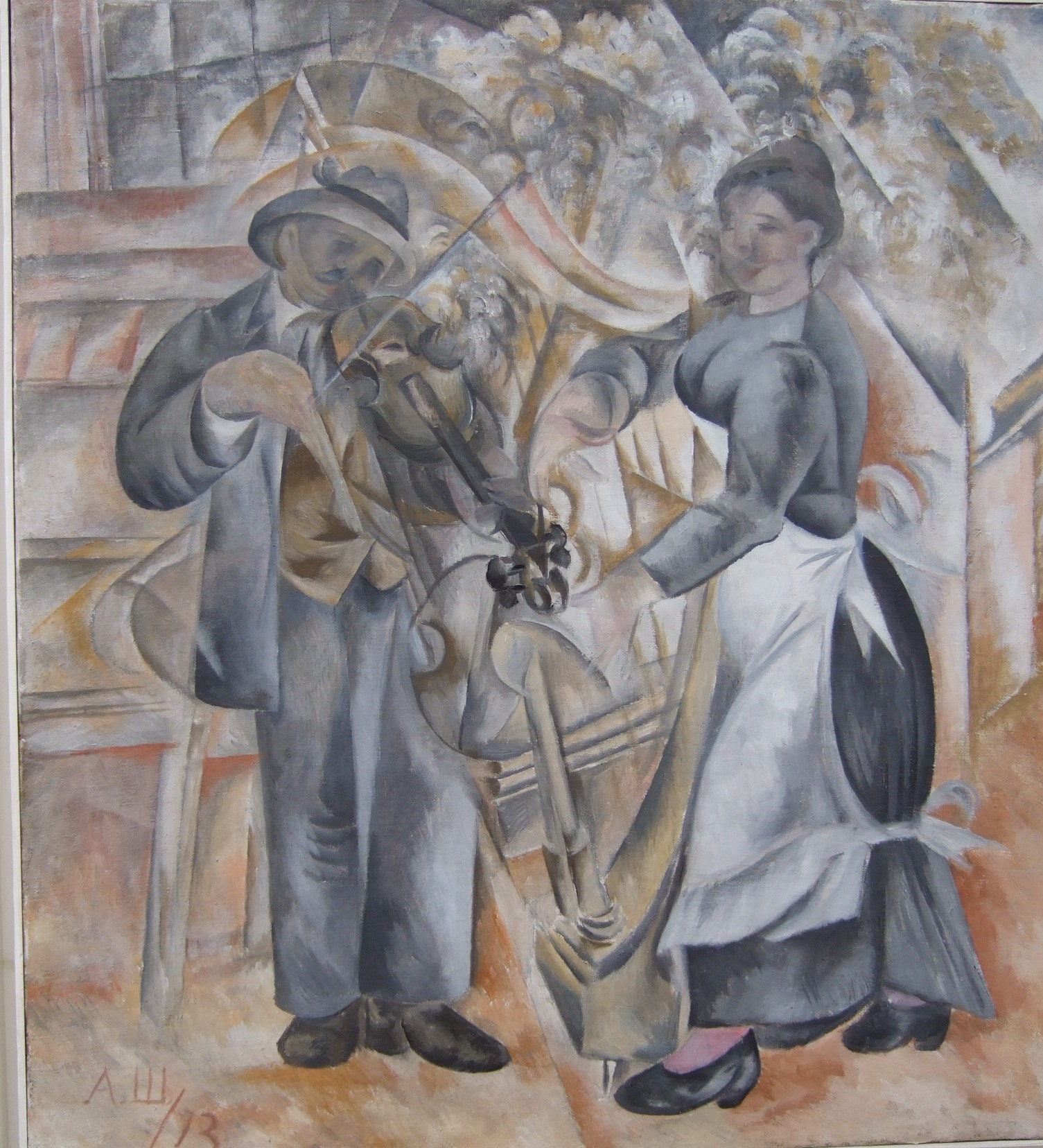
Musicians

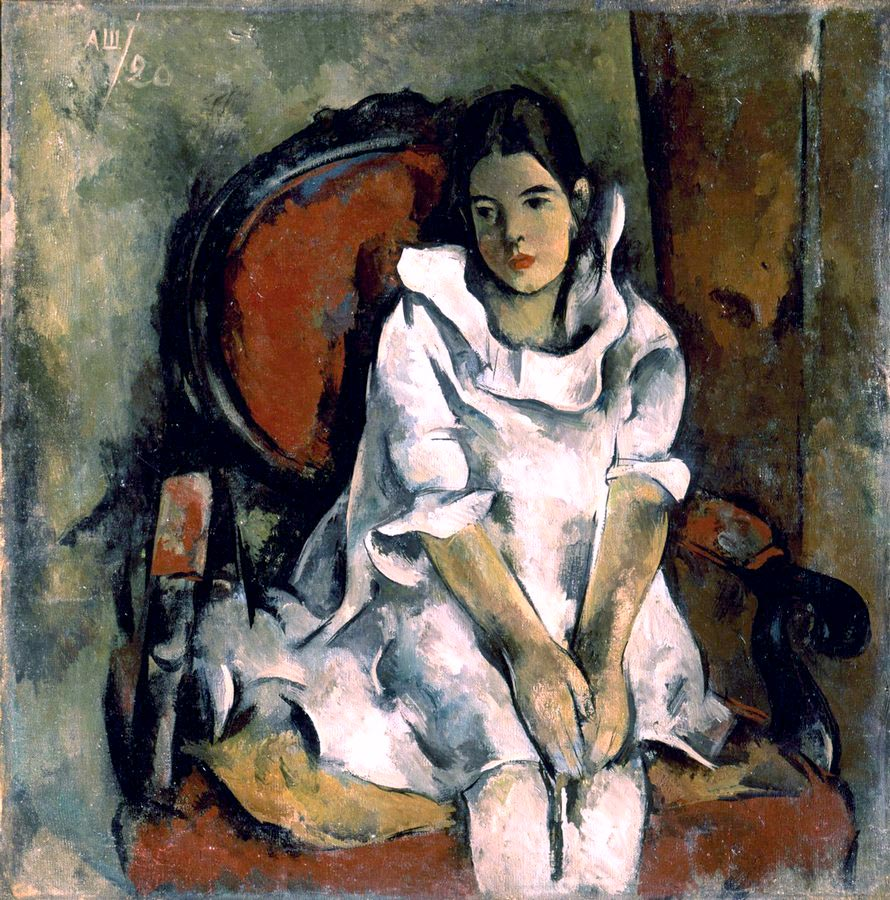
Portrait of the Artist's Daughter

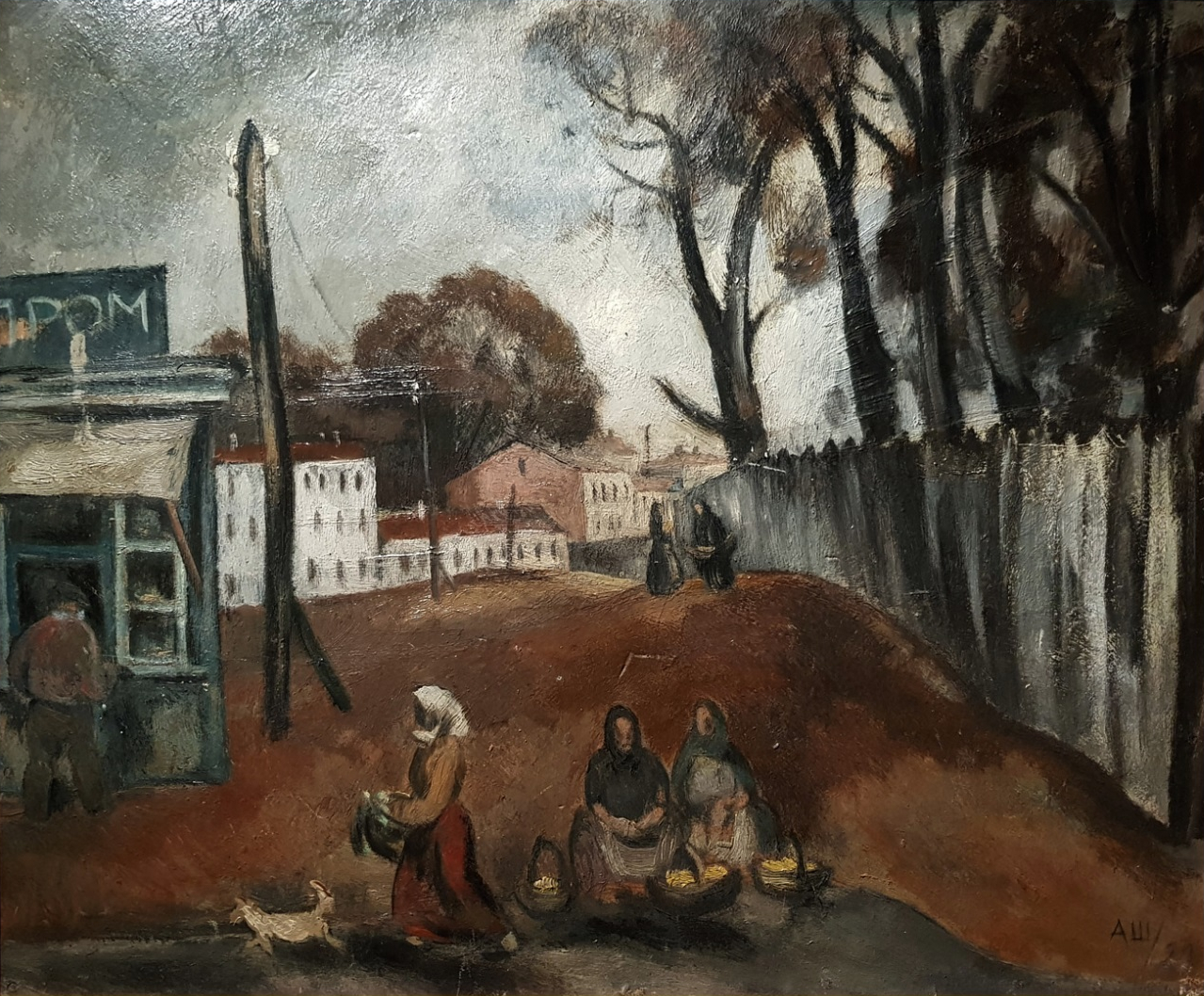
On the Outskirts of Moscow

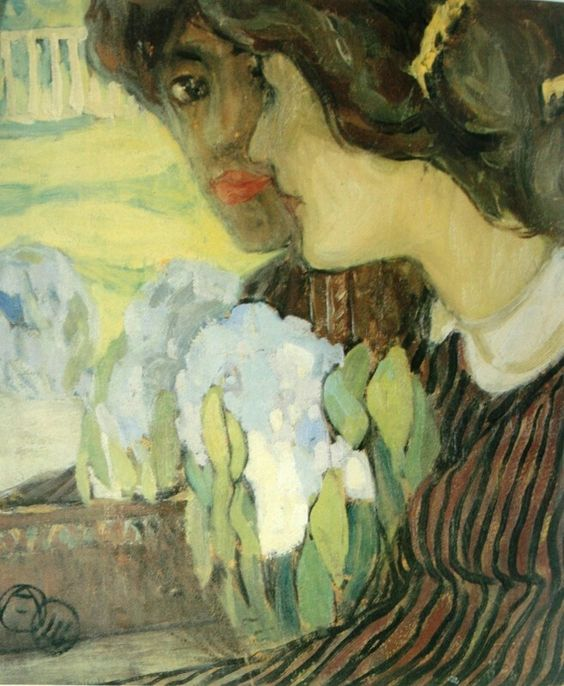
Portrait at the Mirror
