= Nikolai Efimovich Kuznetsov =

Russian painter

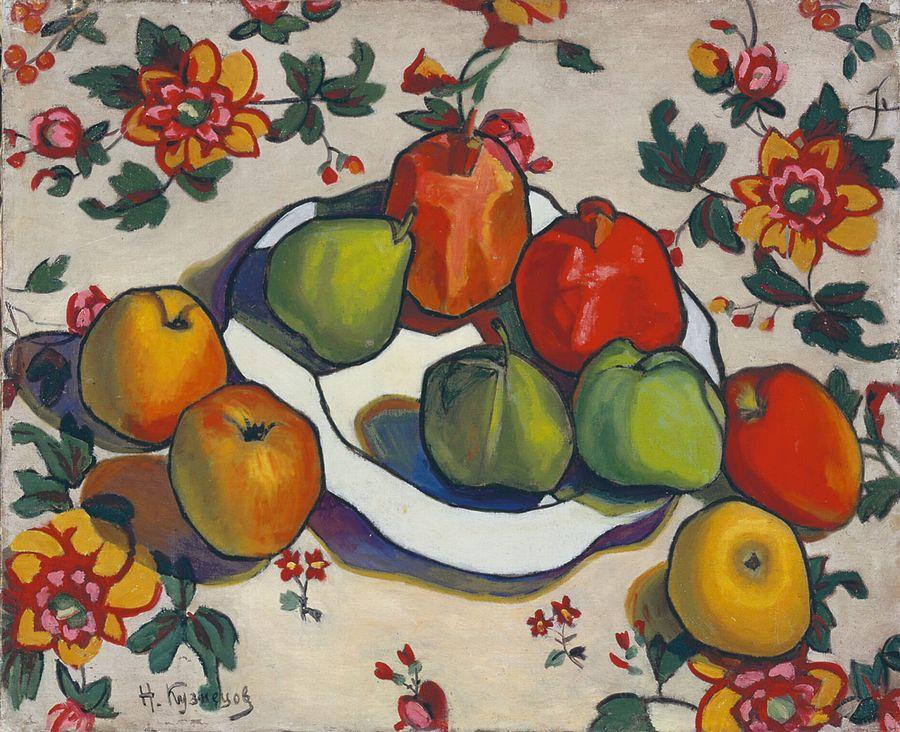
Pomegranates and Apples, 1916

Nikolai Efimovich Kuznetsov (1879–1970) was a Russian Empire and later a Soviet painter and theatre designer. His teachers included Valentin Serov and Konstantin Korovin. From 1916 to 1918 he exhibited with the Jack of Diamonds group; from 1915 to 1922 he was a member of the Free Art Society. He began designing for the theatre in 1917. His work continued to be exhibited after the Revolution.

== Works ==
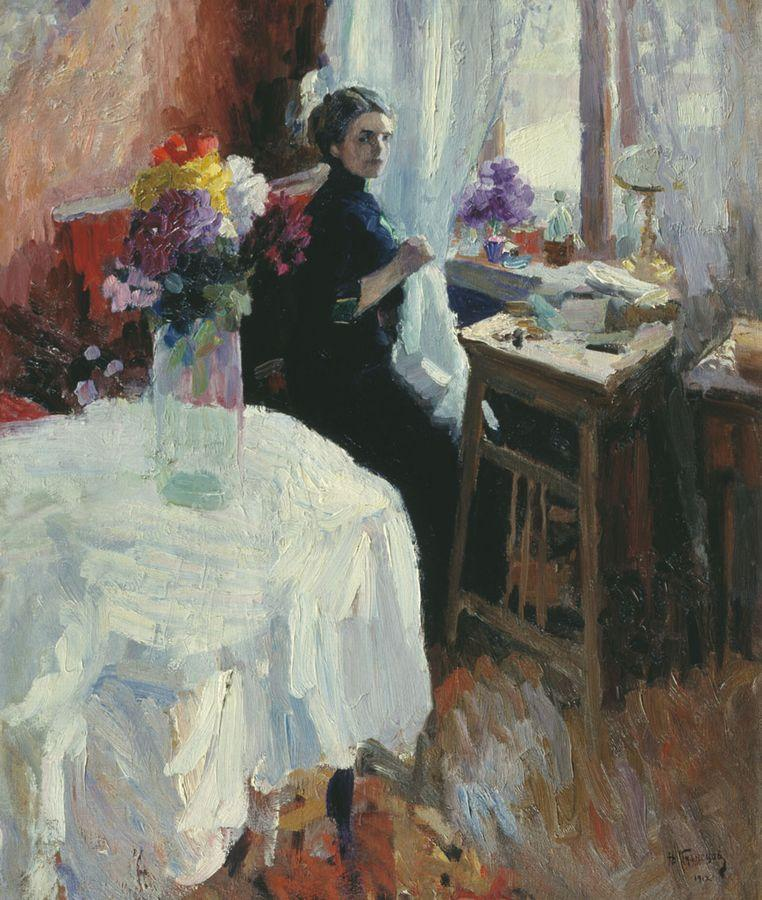
At work, 1912

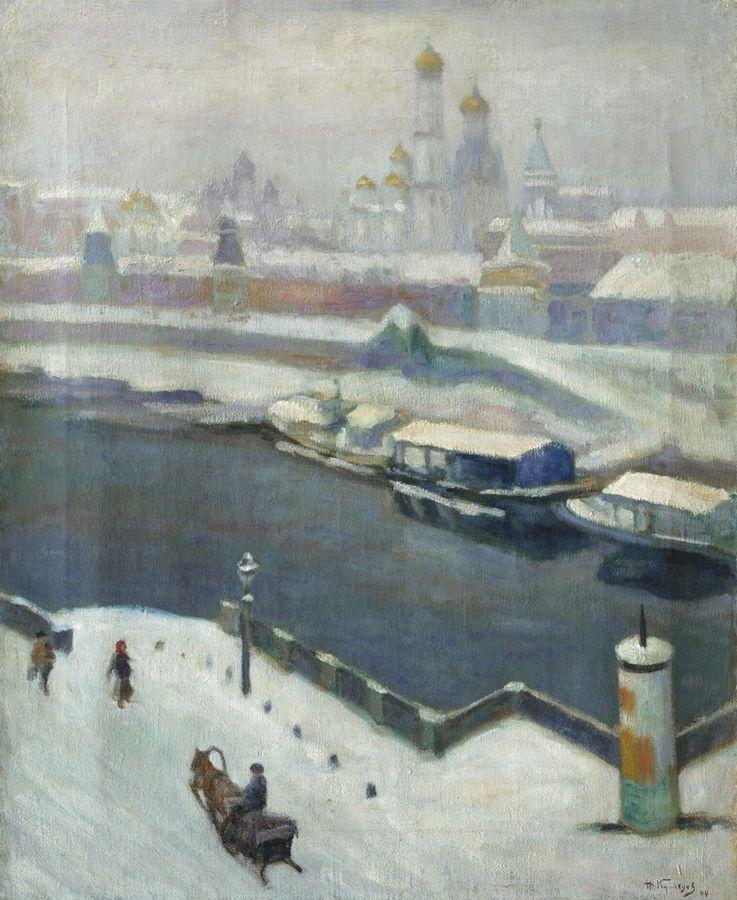
Kremlin in winter, 1912
