= Marshak =

Marshak, Marschak or Marshek (Russian: Маршак) is a surname of Jewish (eastern Ashkenazic) origin.

- Archie Marshek (1902–1992), American film editor
- Boris Marshak (1933–2006), Russian archaeologist
- Chris Miles (born as Christopher Miles Marshak 1999), American rapper
- Jacob Marschak (1898–1977), American economist
- Robert Marshak (1916–1992), American physicist
- Samuil Marshak (1887–1964), Russian writer, translator and children's poet
- Sondra Marshak (born 1942), American fiction writer

== See also ==
- Marchak
- Marsak
- Marshak, Iran, a village
