= Aleksandr V. Kuprin =

Russian painter

- Александр В. Куприн
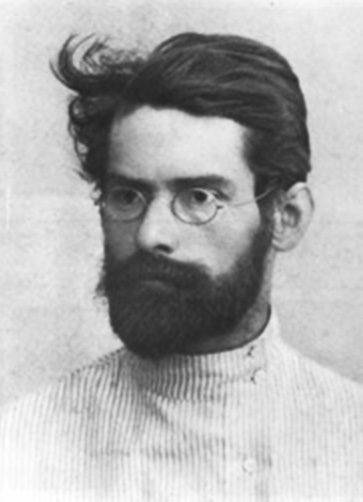
- Born: 10 March 1880; Borisoglebsk, Voronezh Governorate, Russian Empire
- Died: 18 March 1960 (aged 80); Moscow, Russia
- Known for: Still life painting; landscapes; industrial landscapes
- Movement: Knave of Diamonds association; Moscow Painters Association; Society of Moscow Artists

Aleksandr Vasilyevich Kuprin (Russian: Александр Васильевич Куприн; 10 March 1880 — 18 March 1960) was a Russian painter, a founding member of the Knave of Diamonds group. Kuprin was born in Borisoglebsk (in Voronezh Oblast, Russia) and died in Moscow. His most famous works are various landscape, still lifes and Cubist nudes.

== Early life ==
Aleksandr Kuprin, the child of a district school history and geography teacher, was born in the south of Russia in 1880, in Borisoglebsk, a busy inland port on the Vorona River. As a young man, he took evening classes at the local Society of Art Lovers, while working as a clerk on the railway. He studied in Voronezh ( 1896–1901). In 1902, he traveled to St. Petersburg to commence formal art training.

== Career ==
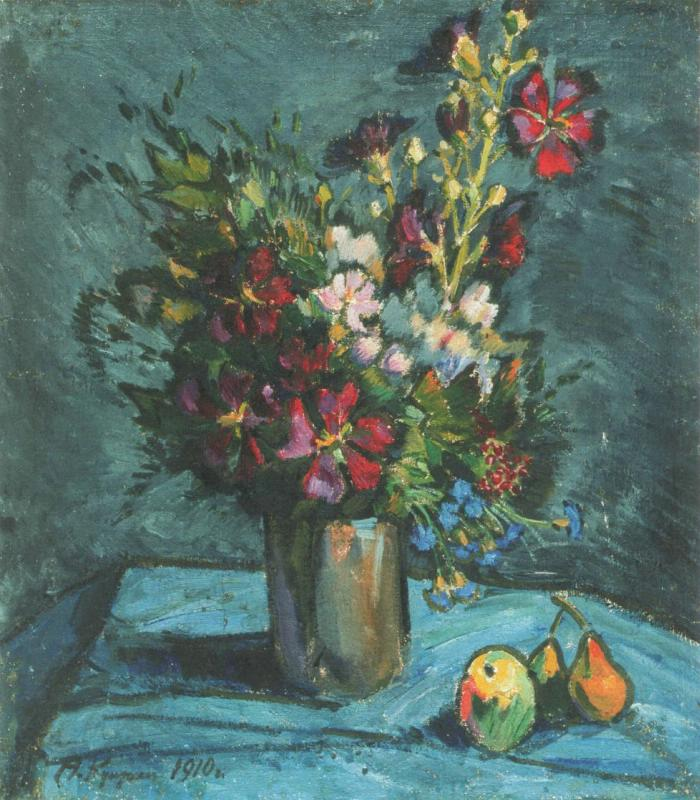
Alexander V. Kuprin, Mallows on Black Background (1910)

=== Early training ===
Kuprin studied in private ateliers for two years in St. Petersburg before moving to Moscow in 1904, where, by 1906, he was enrolled at the Moscow School of Painting, Sculpture, and Architecture as a student under Abram Arkhipov and Konstantin Korovin, the latter a most noted Russian impressionist. Kuprin's paintings of this period reflect this influence, with their loose brush strokes and emphasis on shadow and light.

In 1908, Kuprin was exposed to the new styles of French painting in the private collections of Moscow patrons. By 1910, he had dropped out of school to become one of the founding members of the Knave of Diamonds arts association (Russian: Бубновый валет, Romanized: Bubnovyi Valet). The association's inaugural exhibition was the explosive international height of avant-garde painting of the period, including works by French artists Henri Le Fauconnier, Wassily Kandinsky, and a new generation of paintings by young Russians impatient with old schools of thought.

=== Paul Cézanne, Cubism, and the Geometry of Form ===
Kuprin's admiration of Cézanne was very much evident in the paintings he submitted to the 1910 Knave of Diamonds inaugural exhibition (see illustrations, left). His characteristic works of this period combined decorative principles with keen analytical insight into the objects being depicted (Still Life With Blue Tray, 1914; Still Life With a Statuette, 1919; Autumn Bouquet, 1925—all in the Tret’iakov Gallery). These were painting questions that would dominate in his work for the next decade, although, as he continued with these themes, the geometry of his forms is gradually smoothed out.

In 1918, Kuprin took a post as professor at Svomas in St. Petersburg and also at the Vkhutemas design school in Moscow (State Higher Arts and Technical Studios), where he would continue as lecturer until 1952.

In 1925, he became a member of the Moscow Painters Association, a shift that moved him away from the earlier rebellious associations with the Knave group.

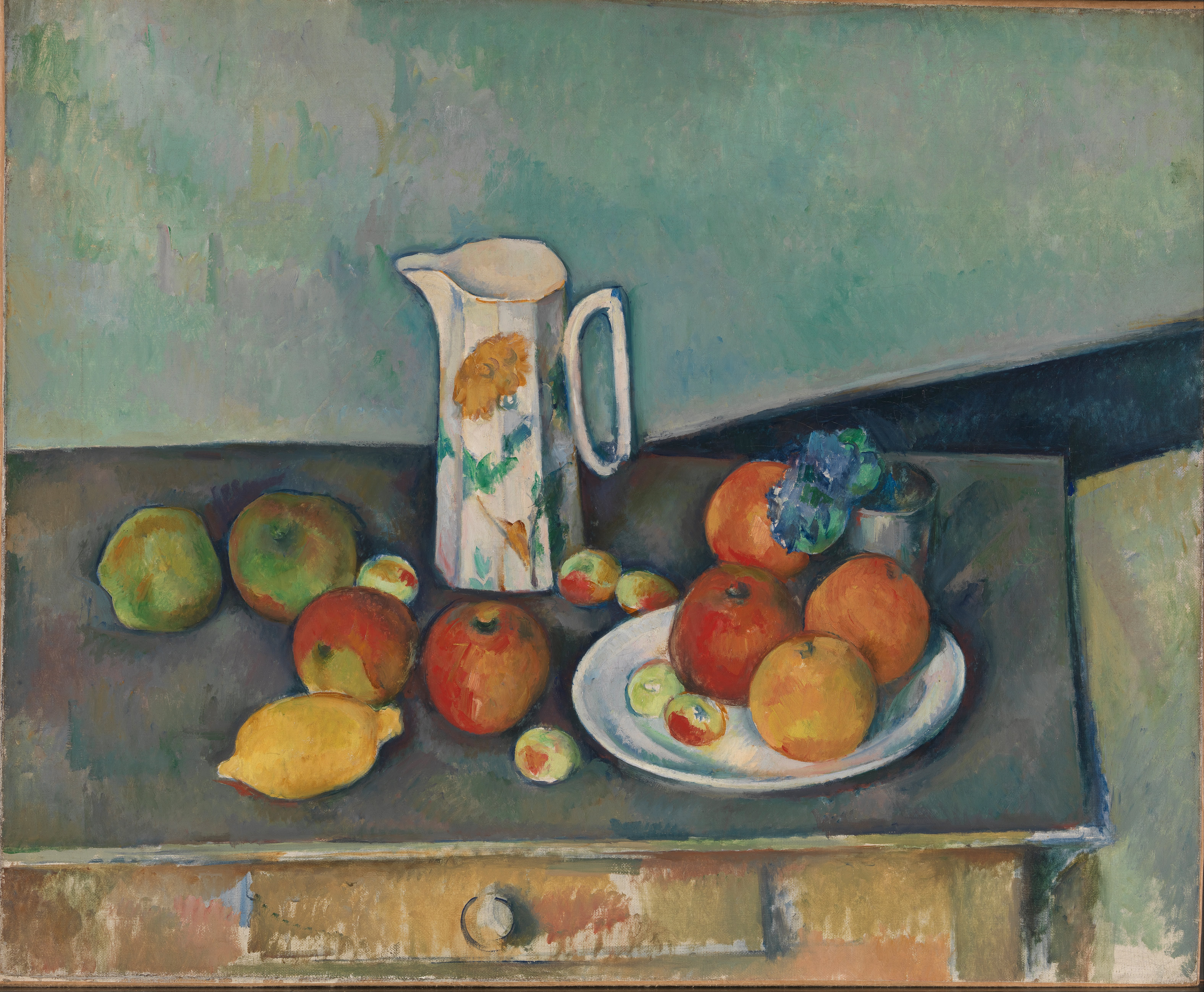
Paul Cézanne, Still life (~1890)

=== Soviet Influence ===
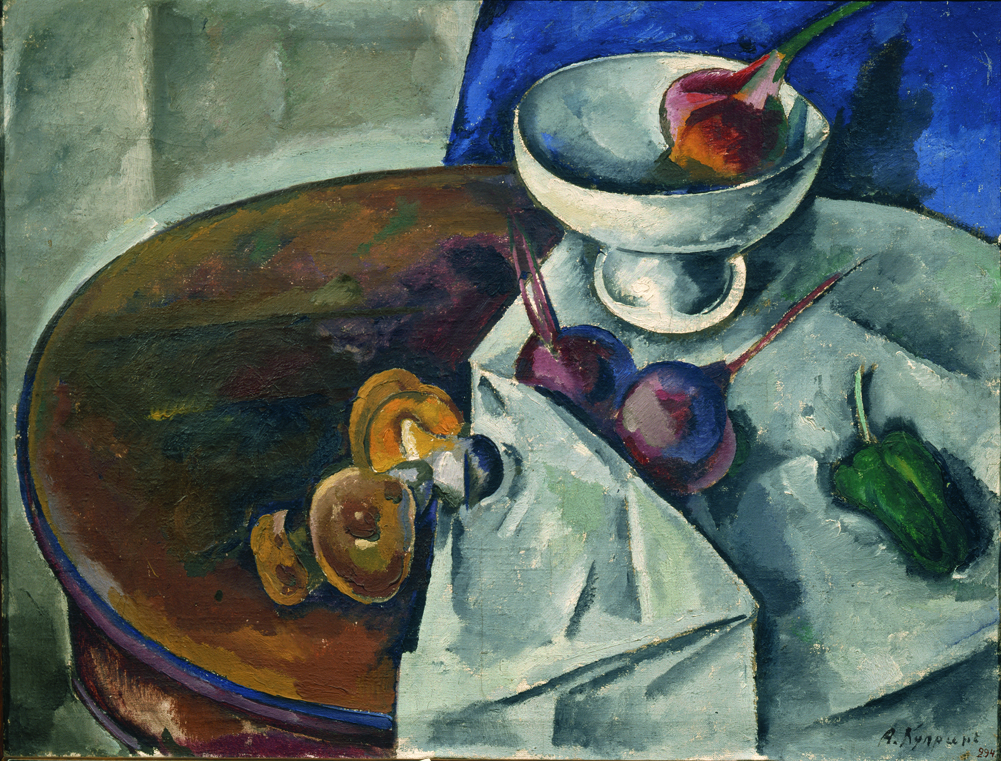
Alexander Kuprin, A Round Table (1914)

Toward the end of the 1920s, realistic tendencies became stronger in Kuprin's work. He abandoned the approach of the Jack of Diamonds group for a more direct manner, taking up plein air painting and adopting its characteristic treatment of volume and space. This was in line with the dictates of Socialist Realism that, increasingly, had become a barrier to experimentation in Russian art. In the 1930s Kuprin started producing the industrial landscapes that are considered some of his best-known works.

This was also the period of Kuprin's work from the Crimea, coinciding with the brief period of its autonomous rule (1921-1945). The Crimean paintings reveal "the innermost harmony and dynamics of nature and its tactile quality." (The Poplars, 1927; The Beasal’skaia Valley, 1937—both in the Tret’iakov Gallery). Kuprin was an outstanding master of the industrial landscape (The Plant, 1915; Baku: The Oil Fields of Bibi-Eibat, 1931—both in the Tret’iakov Gallery).

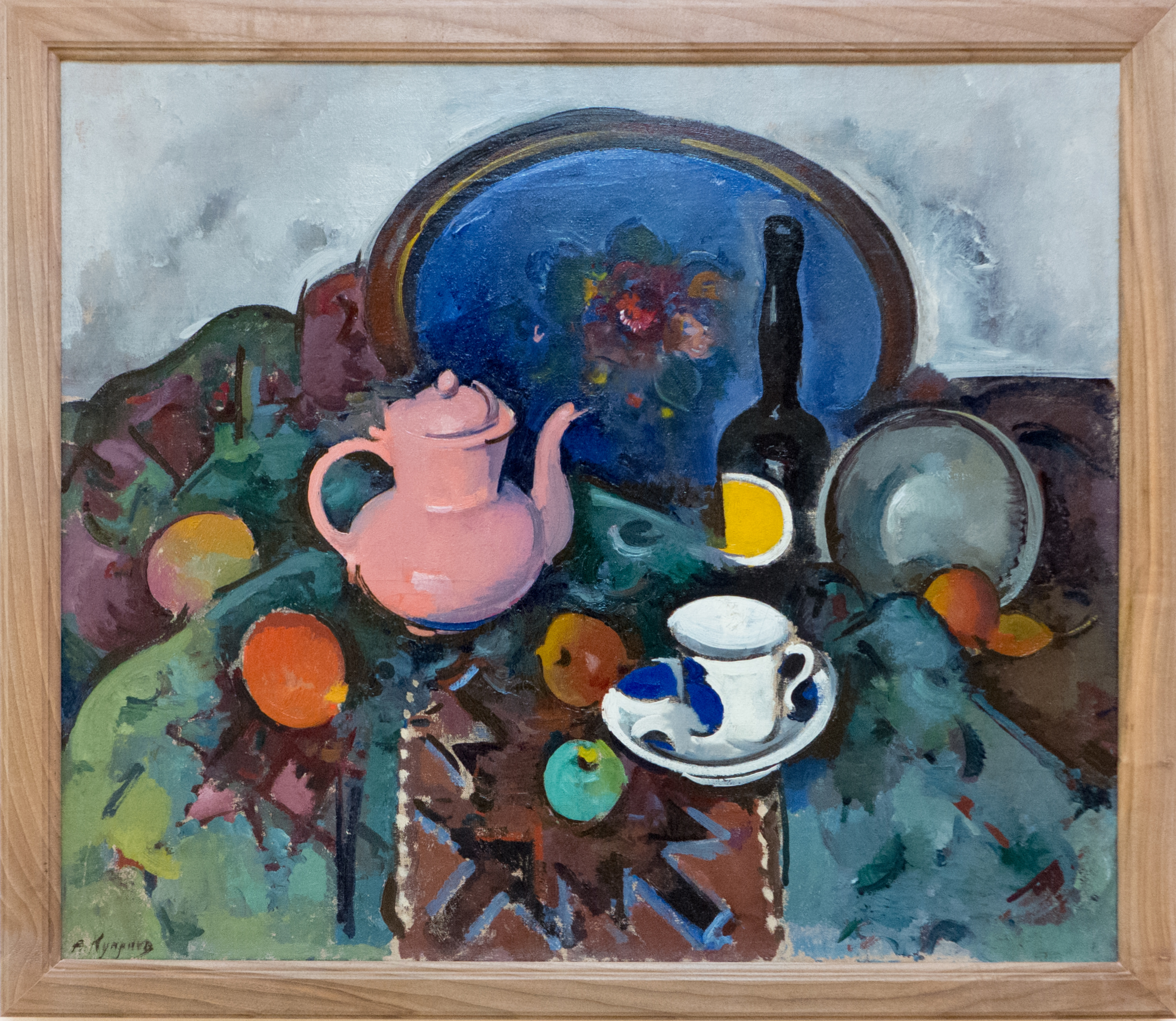
Alexander V. Kuprin, Still-Life with a pink tea pot (1921)
