= 1927 in fine arts of the Soviet Union =

Monument to Lenin
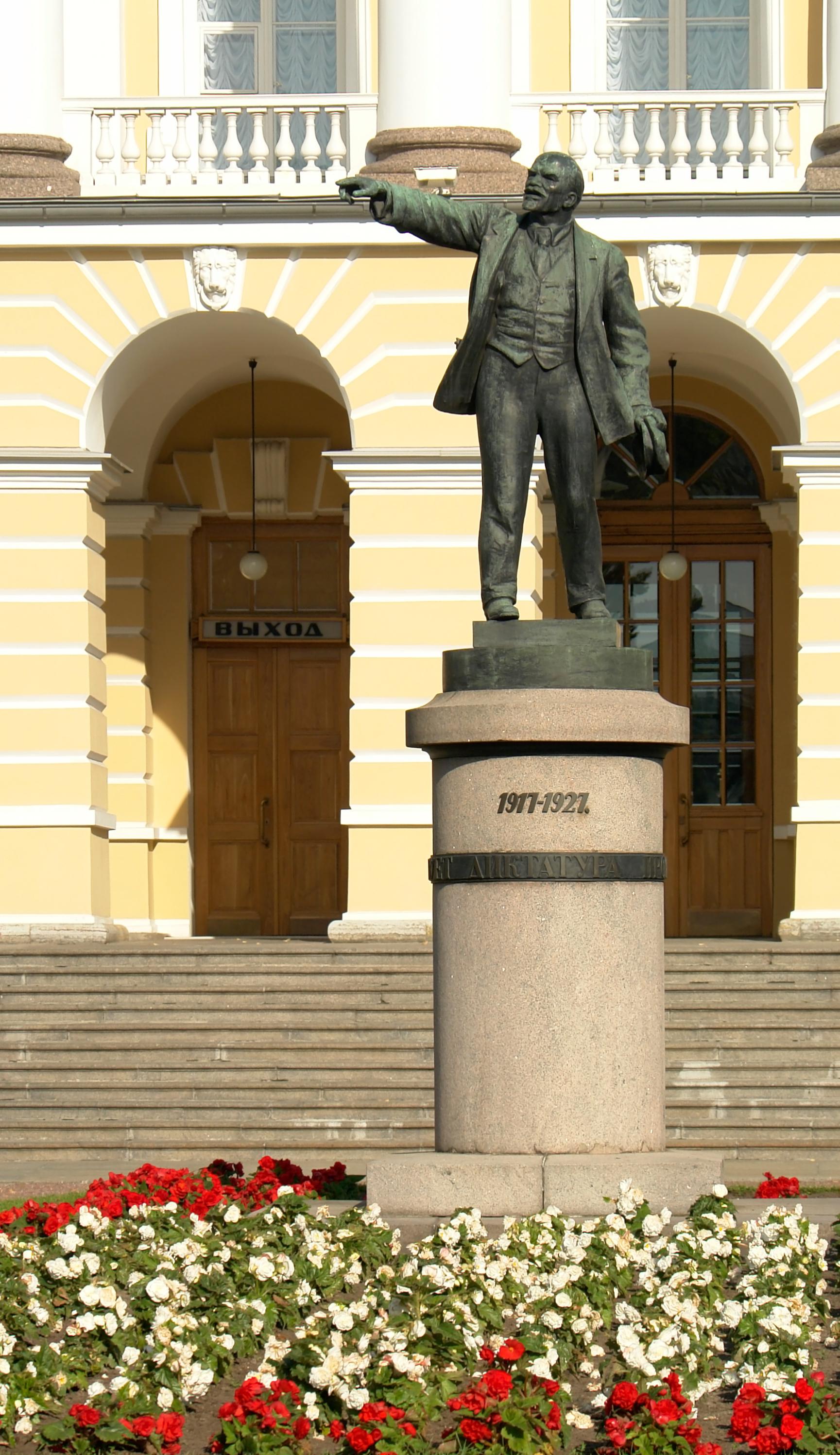
- Artist: V. Kozlov
- Year: 1927
- Subject: Vladimir Lenin
- Location: Smolny Institute, Leningrad

The year 1927 was marked by many events that left an imprint on the history of Soviet and Russian Fine Arts.

== Events ==
- Regular Exhibition of the A. Kuindzhi Society is opened in the premises of the Society of Art Promotion. Participants: Piotr Buchkin, Yefim Cheptsov, Alfred Eberling, Alexander Lubimov, Arcady Rylov, Mikhail Platunov, Vasily Savinsky, Vasily Svarog and others.
- First Exhibition of the Association of artists Circle of Artists is opened at the State Russian Museum. Participants: Sergei Chugunov, Vasily Kuptsov, Vladimir Malagis, Alexei Pakhomov, Alexander Rusakov, Alexander Samokhvalov, Mikhail Verbov, and others.
- March 1 — Exhibition of works by artists of group «Jack of Diamonds» (Russian: «Бубновый валет», also called as «Knave of Diamonds») was opened in Moscow in the Tretyakov gallery. Exhibited 72 works of 8 authors. The participants were Natalia Goncharova, Mikhail Larionov, Pyotr Konchalovsky, Alexander Kuprin, Aristarkh Lentulov, Ilya Mashkov, Vasily Rozhdestvensky, and Robert Falk.

Stone as a weapon of the proletariat
- Булыжник — оружие пролетариата (Russian)
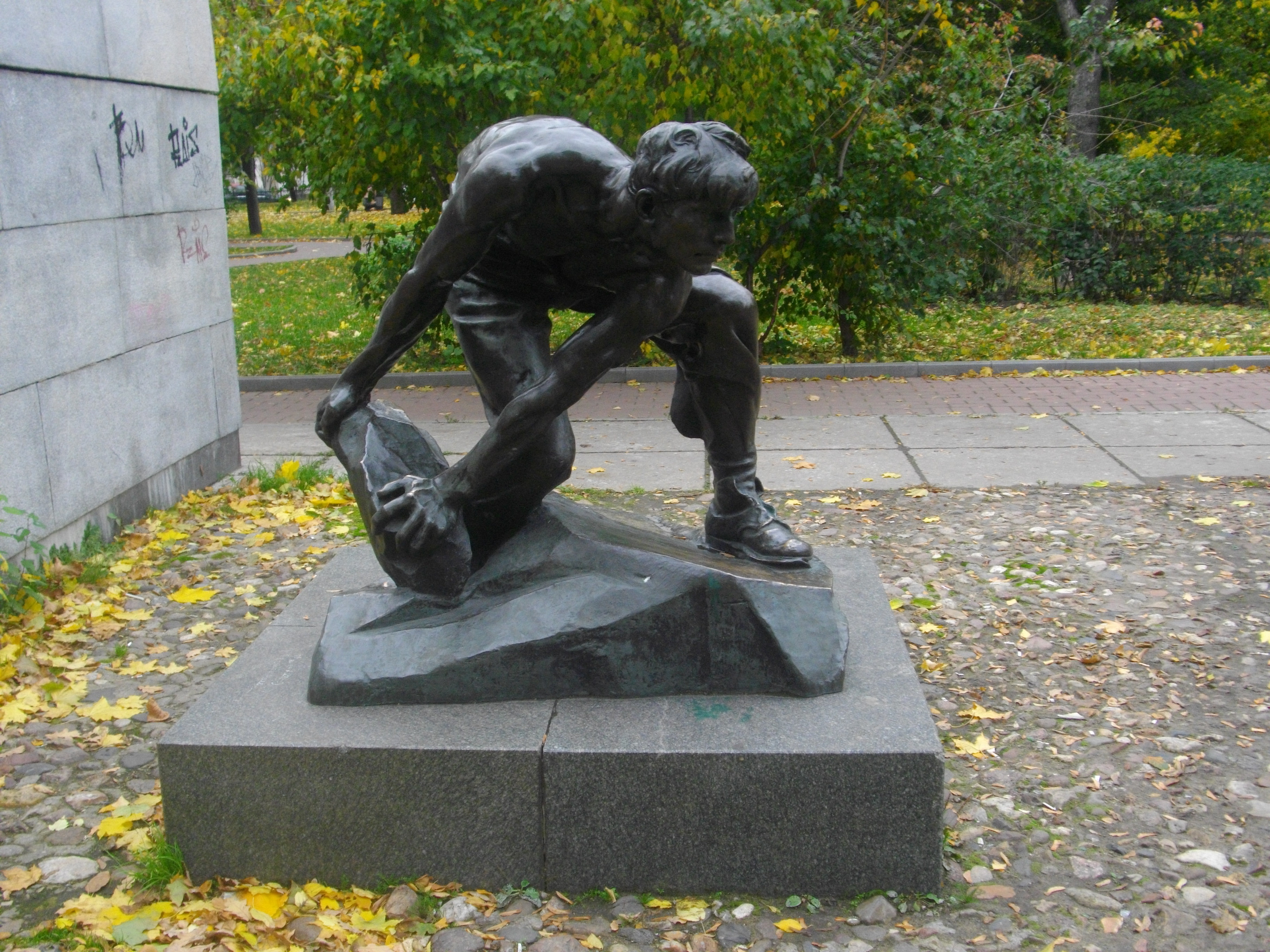
- Artist: Ivan Shadr
- Year: 1927
- Location: Tretyakov gallery, Moscow

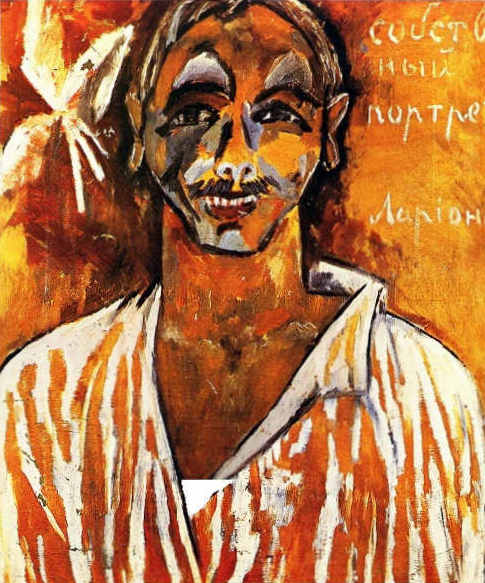
Mikhail Larionov

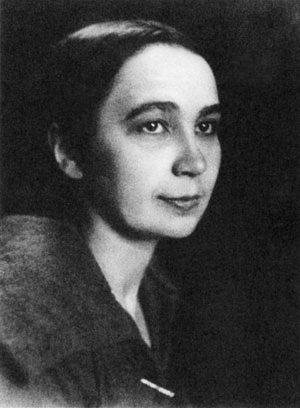
Natalia Goncharova

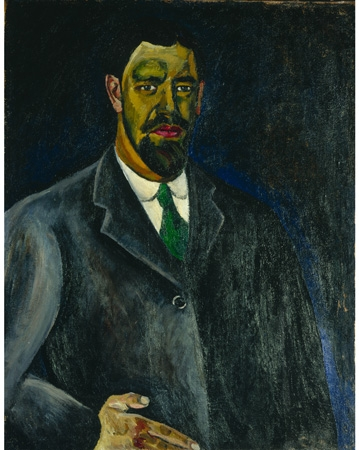
Pyotr Konchalovsky

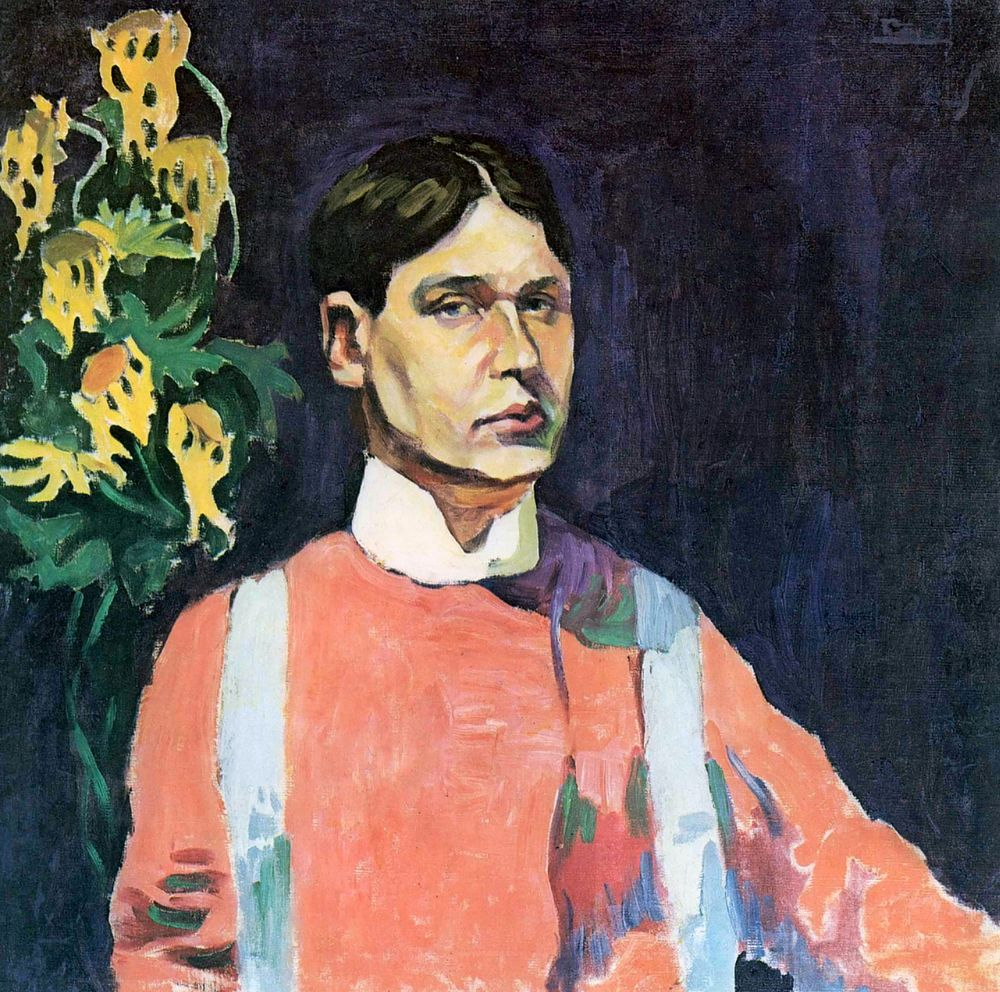
Aristarkh Lentulov

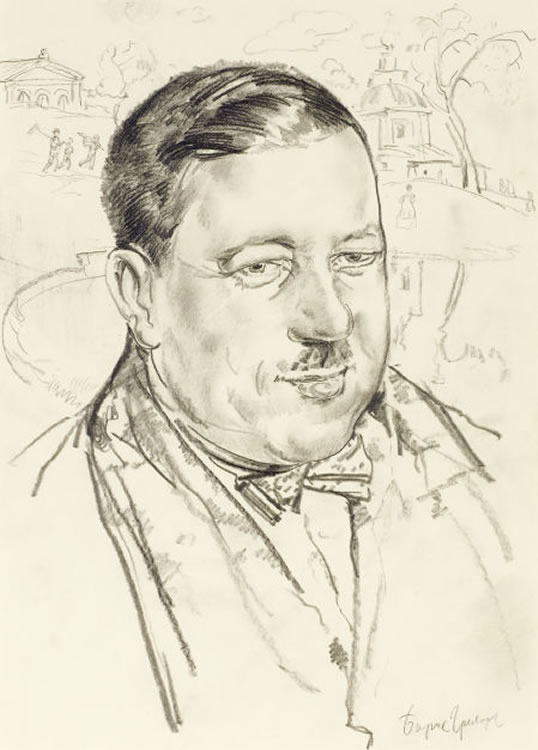
Ilya Mashkov

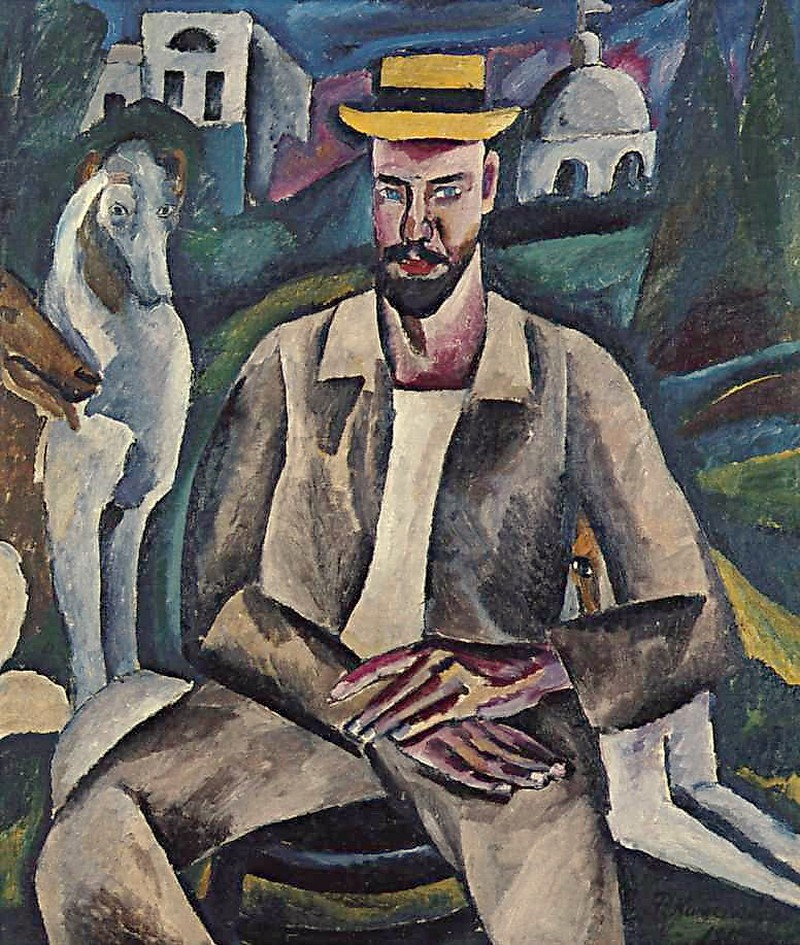
Vasily Rozhdestvensky

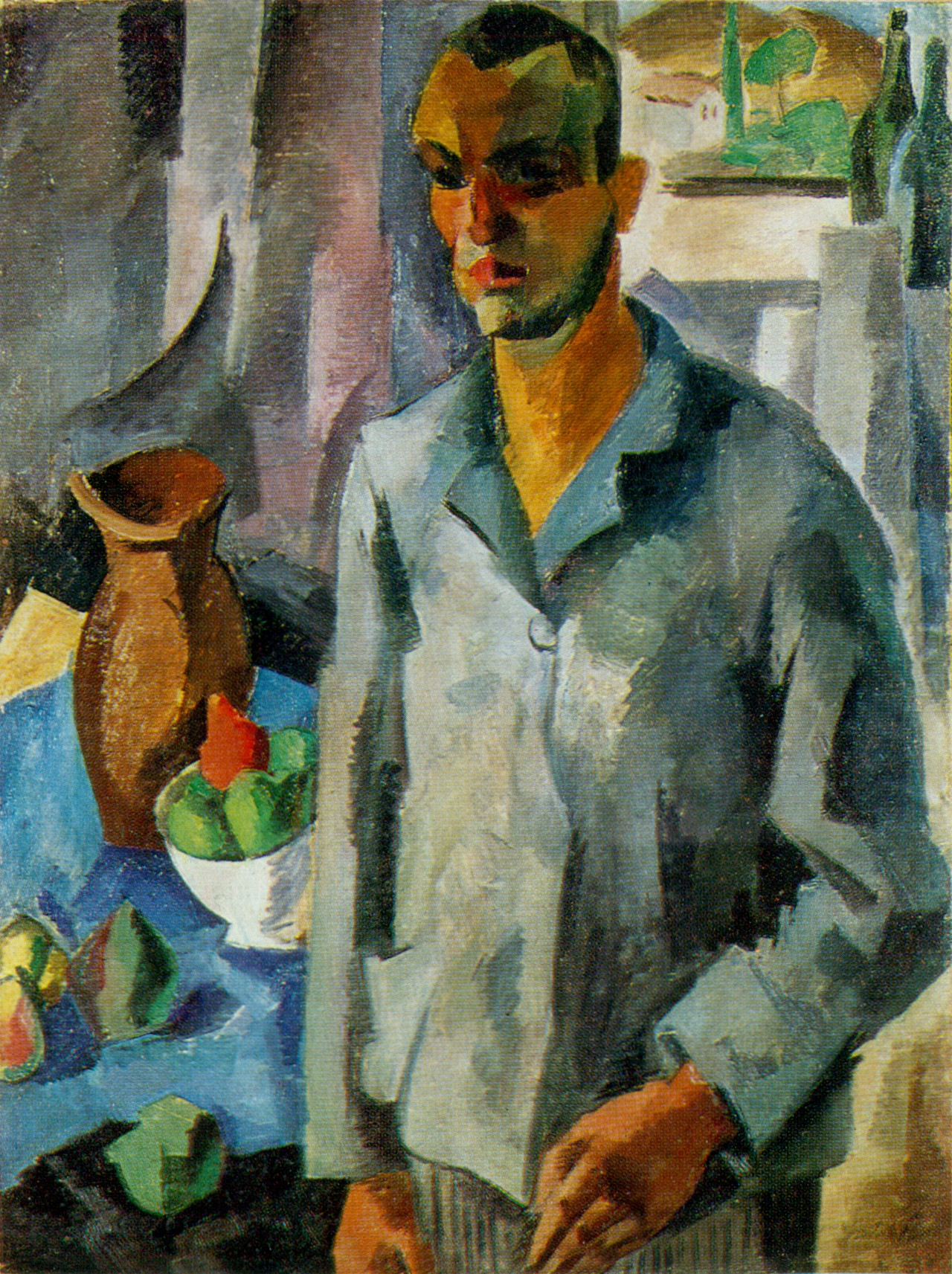
Robert Falk
- A monument to Vladimir Lenin was unveiled in Leningrad in front of Smolny. Author of the monument sculptor V. Kozlov and architects V. Shchuko and V. Gelfreykh.
- March 17 — Exhibition of works by group of «Masters of Analytical Art» (also called as «Group of Pavel Filonov») was opened in Leningrad in the House of Press. The participants were Vladimir Avlas, Sofia Zaklikovskaya, Evgeny Kibrik, Pavel Kondraniev, Lydia Frokova-Bagreeva, and others.
- Sculptor Ivan Shadr (1887–1941) created sculpture «Stone as a weapon of the proletariat». The original plaster reside in the Tretyakov Gallery. Bronze version (1947) was unveiled in Moscow in 1967.

== Births ==
- January 13 — Boris Kharchenko (Russian: Харченко Борис Дмитриевич), Russian soviet painter and art educator (d.1985).
- March 29 — Zlata Bizova (Russian: Бызова Злата Николаевна), Russian soviet painter.
- May 17 — Vladimir Sakson (Russian: Саксон Владимир Станиславович), Russian soviet painter and theatre artist (d.1988).
- June 17 — Yury Yershov (Russian: Юрий Серге́евич Ершов), Russian soviet painter (d.2008).
- June 20 — Vecheslav Kotionochkin (Russian: Котёночкин Вячеслав Михайлович), Russian soviet artist-animator and producer (d.2000).
- November 7 — Piotr Litvinsky (Russian: Литвинский Пётр Петрович), Russian soviet painter and art educator (d.2009).

== Deaths ==
- May 26 — Boris Kustodiev (Russian: Кустодиев Борис Михайлович), Russian painter and graphic artist (b.1878).
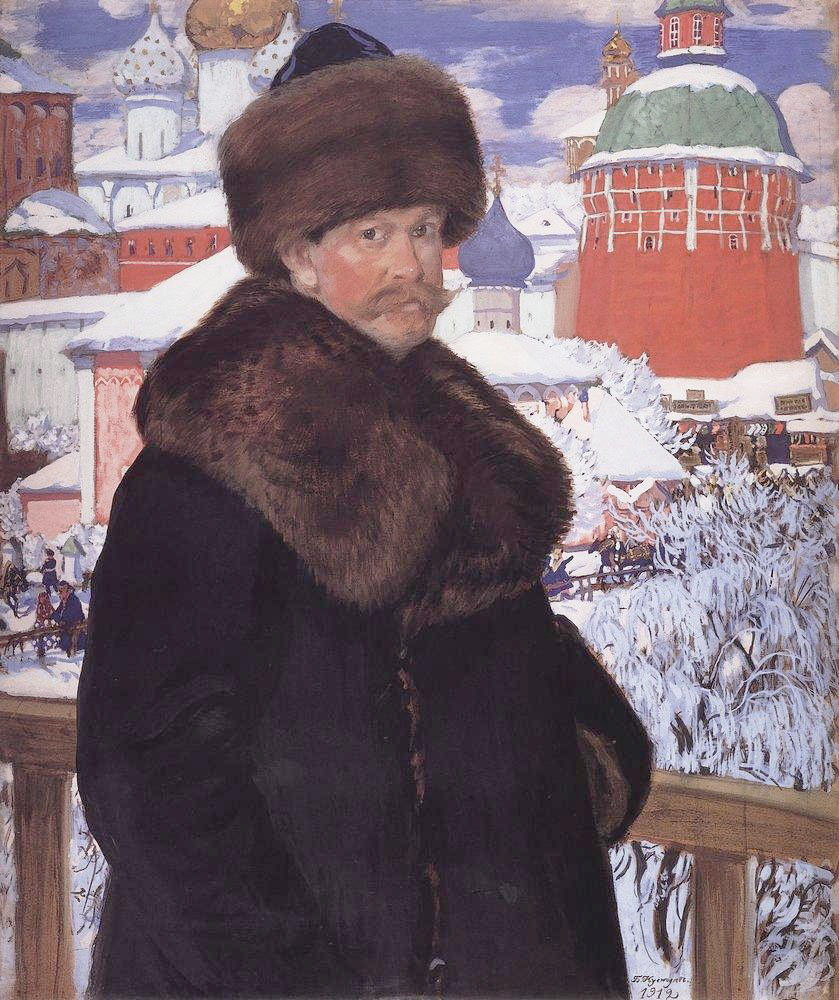
Boris Kustodiev

== See also ==
- List of Russian artists
- List of painters of Leningrad Union of Artists
- Saint Petersburg Union of Artists
- Russian culture
- 1927 in the Soviet Union

== Sources ==
- Выставка произведений художников группы «Бубновый валет». М., Государственная Третьяковская галерея, 1927.
- Юбилейная выставка изобразительных искусств. 1917—Х—1927. Каталог. Л., Издание Комитета выставки, 1927.
- Вс. Воинов. Юбилейная выставка в Октябрьские дни в Ленинграде и Москве. Л., «Красная панорама», 1927, № 49, С. 8.
- Каталог выставки картин «Общества им. А. И. Куинджи» в залах Общества поощрения художеств. Л., 1927.
- Artists of Peoples of the USSR. Biography Dictionary. Vol. 1. Moscow, Iskusstvo, 1970.
- Artists of Peoples of the USSR. Biography Dictionary. Vol. 2. Moscow, Iskusstvo, 1972.
- Directory of Members of Union of Artists of USSR. Volume 1,2. Moscow, Soviet Artist Edition, 1979.
- Directory of Members of the Leningrad branch of the Union of Artists of Russian Federation. Leningrad, Khudozhnik RSFSR, 1980.
- Artists of Peoples of the USSR. Biography Dictionary. Vol. 4 Book 1. Moscow, Iskusstvo, 1983.
- Directory of Members of the Leningrad branch of the Union of Artists of Russian Federation. – Leningrad: Khudozhnik RSFSR, 1987.
- Персональные и групповые выставки советских художников. 1917-1947 гг. М., Советский художник, 1989.
- Artists of peoples of the USSR. Biography Dictionary. Vol. 4 Book 2. – Saint Petersburg: Academic project humanitarian agency, 1995.
- Link of Times: 1932 – 1997. Artists – Members of Saint Petersburg Union of Artists of Russia. Exhibition catalogue. – Saint Petersburg: Manezh Central Exhibition Hall, 1997.
- Matthew C. Bown. Dictionary of 20th Century Russian and Soviet Painters 1900-1980s. – London: Izomar, 1998.
- Vern G. Swanson. Soviet Impressionism. – Woodbridge, England: Antique Collectors' Club, 2001.
- Sergei V. Ivanov. Unknown Socialist Realism. The Leningrad School. – Saint-Petersburg: NP-Print Edition, 2007. – ISBN 5-901724-21-6, ISBN 978-5-901724-21-7.
- Anniversary Directory graduates of Saint Petersburg State Academic Institute of Painting, Sculpture, and Architecture named after Ilya Repin, Russian Academy of Arts. 1915 – 2005. – Saint Petersburg: Pervotsvet Publishing House, 2007.
