= Vasily Kozlov =

Vasily Kozlov may refer to:

- Vasily Kozlov (sculptor) (1887–1940), Soviet sculptor
- Vasily Kozlov (politician) (1903–1967), Soviet politician
