= Smolny Institute =

Palladian edifice in Saint Petersburg, Russia

Coordinates: 59°56′47″N 30°23′47″E

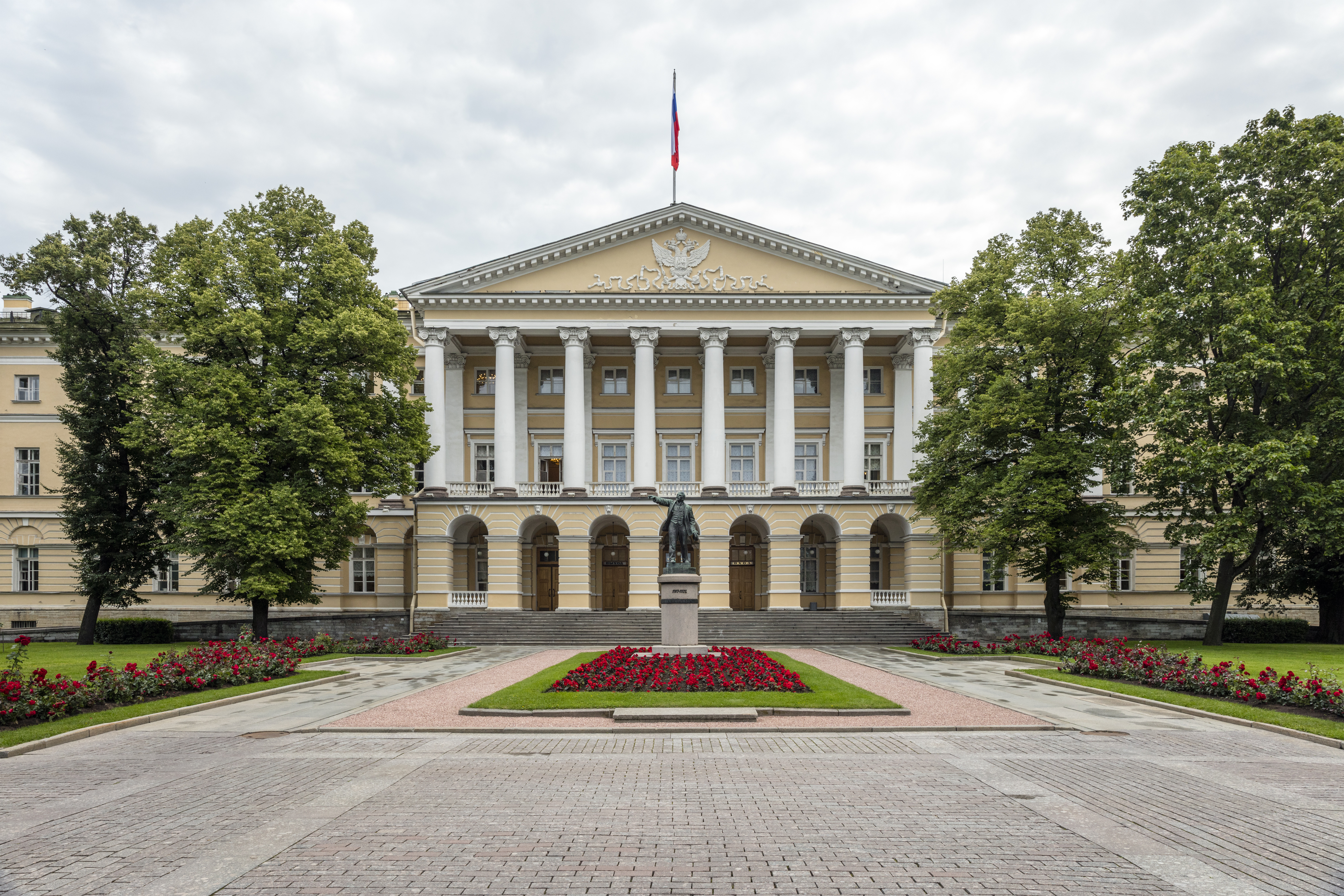
Modern view of the facade, with a Lenin statue in the foreground

The Smolny Institute (Russian: Смольный институт) is a Palladian edifice in Saint Petersburg that has played a major part in the history of Russia, notably as a center of women's education, and the headquarters of the Bolsheviks during the early stages of the October Revolution.

== History ==
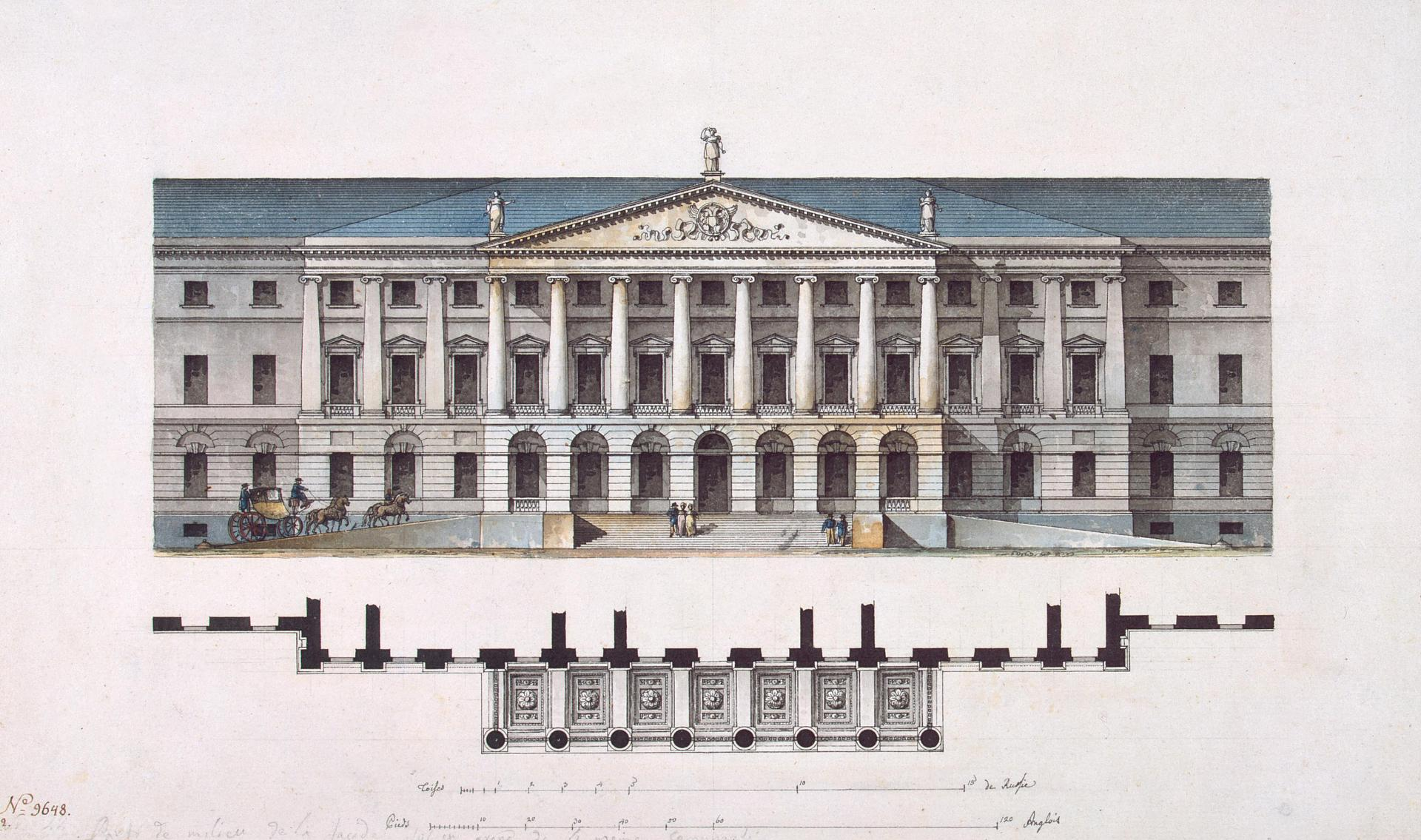
Quarenghi's original design, 1806.

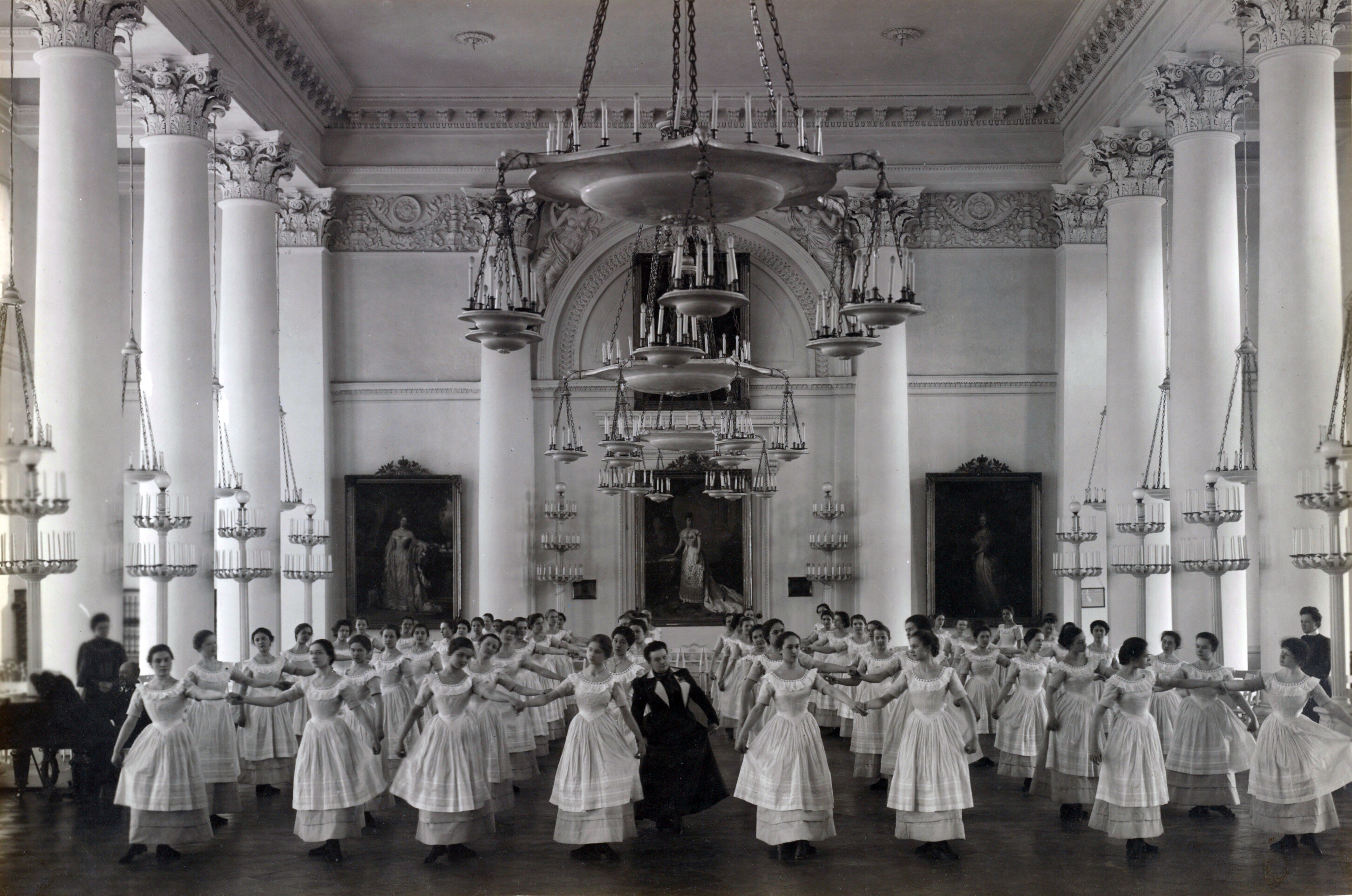
A 1913 dance lesson in the institute's ballroom.

The building was commissioned from Giacomo Quarenghi by the Society for Education of Noble Maidens and constructed in 1806–08 to house the Smolny Institute of Noble Maidens, established at the urging of Ivan Betskoy and in accordance with a decree of Catherine II (the Great) in 1764, borrowing its name from the nearby Smolny Convent. The establishment of the institute was a significant step in making education available for women and girls in Russia: "The provision of formal education for women began only in 1764 and 1765, when Catherine II established first the Smolny Institute for girls of the nobility in Saint Petersburg and then the Novodevichii Institute for the daughters of commoners." The Smolny was Russia's first educational establishment for women and continued to function under the personal patronage of the Russian Empress until just before the 1917 revolution. A parterre garden and iron-work grille around the institute date from the early 19th century.

Smolny Institute got its name from being close to the Smolny Convent that was built on the place where a resin plant had once been ("smola" is Russian for "resin").

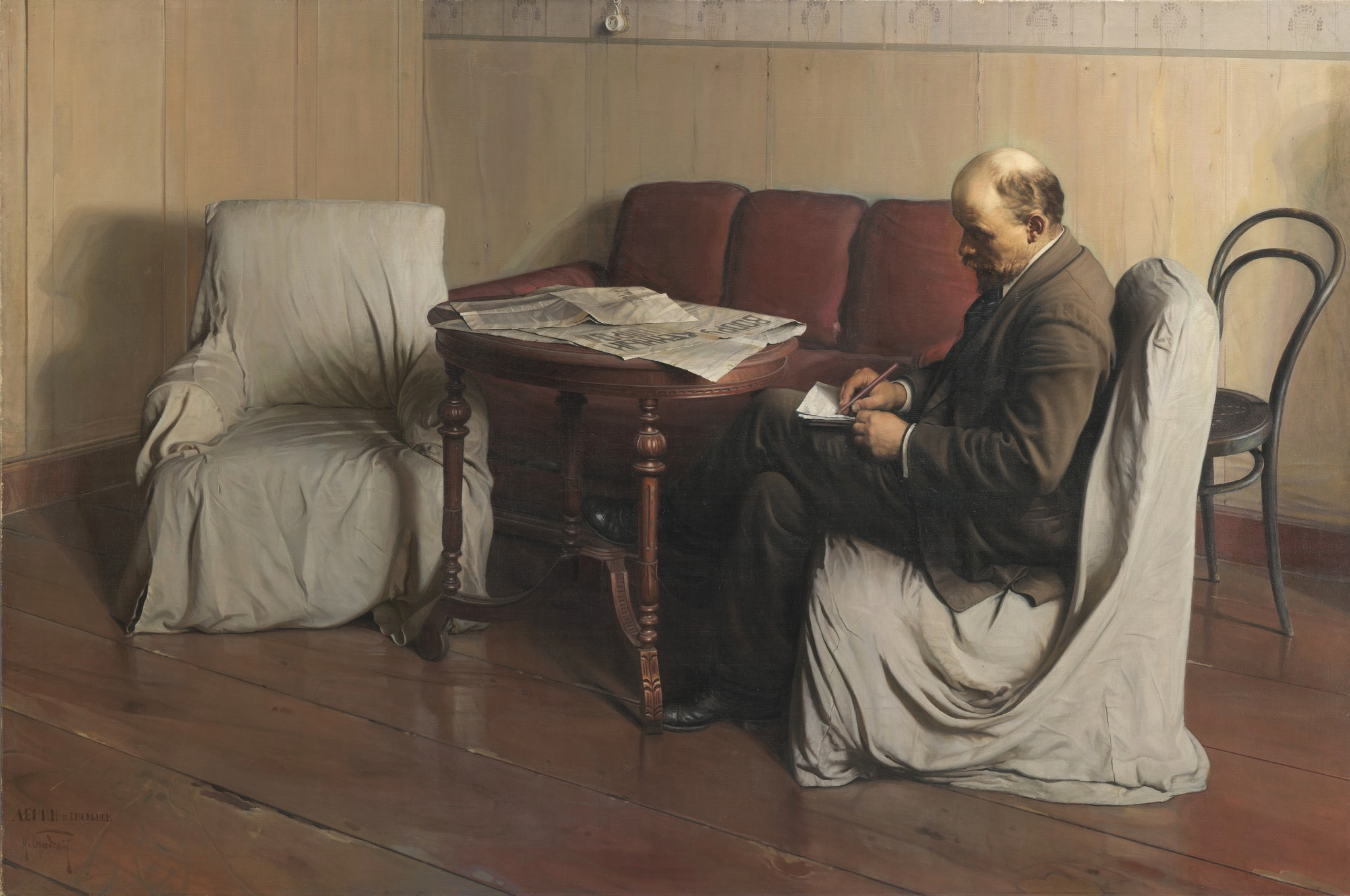
Isaak Brodsky, Lenin in Smolny (1930)

In 1917, Vladimir Lenin chose the building as Bolshevik headquarters immediately before and during the October Revolution. It was Lenin's residence for several months, until the national government was moved to the Moscow Kremlin in March 1918. After that, the Smolny became the headquarters of the local Communist Party apparat, effectively the city hall. In 1927, a monument to Lenin was erected in front of the building, designed by the sculptor Vasily Kozlov and the architects Vladimir Shchuko and Vladimir Gelfreikh. The Smolny Institute was also the site of Sergei Kirov's assassination in 1934.

After 1991, the Smolny was used as the seat of the city mayor (governor after 1996) and city administration of Saint Petersburg. Vladimir Putin worked there from 1991 to 1997 in the administration of Anatoly Sobchak.

Today, this historic building is the official residence of the governor of Saint Petersburg and also houses a museum dedicated to Lenin. Visitors to the museum can tour Lenin's office and living rooms and see the assembly hall where the victory of the October revolution was proclaimed in 1917.

During the Finnish Civil War, the house in Helsinki which served as headquarters of the pro-Bolshevik Red Guard got nicknamed ″Smolna″, after the above Bolshevik headquarters in Saint Petersburg. The nickname stuck even after the defeat of the Red Guard, and the building was still so named when used by the victorious anti-Communist Finns.

== See also ==
- Bibliography of the Russian Revolution and Civil War
- Outline of the Russian Revolution and Civil War
- Index of articles related to the Russian Revolution and Civil War
- Moscow School of the Order of St Catherine, the Moscow equivalent
- Novodevichii Institute, equivalent for burgher class students
