= Robert Falk =

Russian painter (1886–1958)

- Self-Portrait, 1924
- Born: Robert Rafailovich Falk; 27 October 1886; Moscow, Russia
- Died: 1 October 1958 (aged 71); Moscow, Russia
- Education: Moscow School of Painting, Sculpture and Architecture
- Style: Neo-Impressionist
- Movement: Knave of Diamonds Arts Association

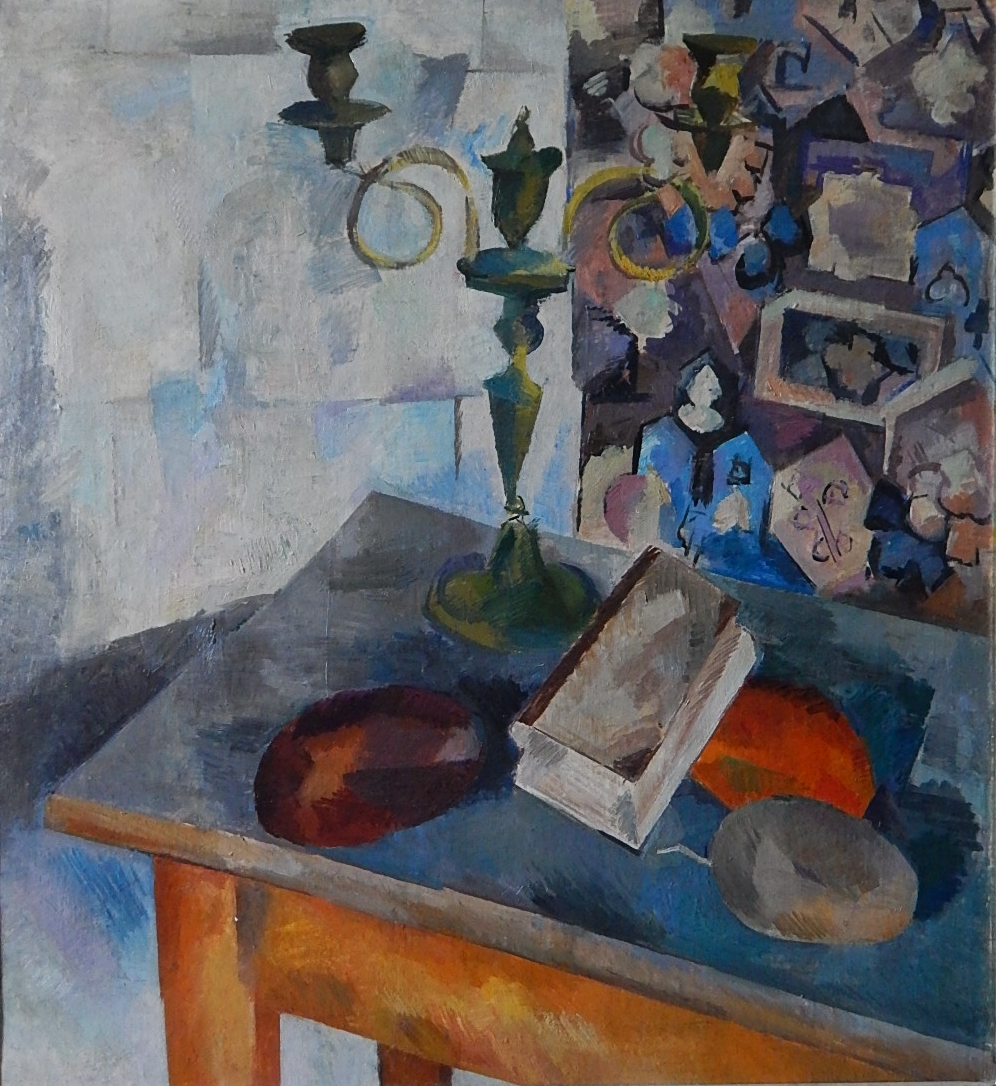
Still Life with Persian Fabric, Candlestick, Bread and Potato. 1917

Robert Rafailovich Falk (Russian: Роберт Рафаилович Фальк, October 15, 1886 – October 1, 1958) was a Russian and Soviet avant-garde painter.

== Early life and career ==
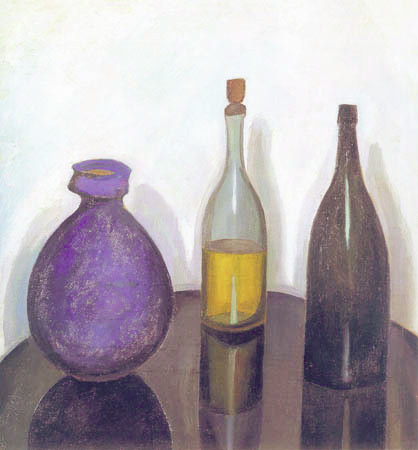
Robert Falk,Still life: Bottles and a Jug. 1912

Falk was born in Moscow in 1886. In 1903 to 1904 he studied art in the studios of Konstantin Yuon and Ilya Mashkov, in 1905 to 1909 he studied at the Moscow School of Painting, Sculpture and Architecture with Konstantin Korovin and Valentin Serov.

In 1910, Falk was one of the founders and the most active participant of the artistic group Jack of Diamonds. Along with Mikhail Larionov and Natalia Goncharova, Ilya Mashkov, Pyotr Konchalovsky, Alexander Kuprin, Aristarkh Lentulov, Vasily Rozhdestvensky with whom he became friends at the Moscow School of Painting, he was one of the Jack of Diamonds creators and major representatives. This group of artists, one of the first currents of the Russian avant-garde, rejected academicism and realism of the 19th century and was influenced, at the beginning, by the work of Paul Cézanne, whom it defended, and by Post-Impressionism.

The group considered Paul Cézanne the only painter worth following, and the rest of visual art to be too trivial and bourgeois. The distinctive feature of Falk's paintings of the time was sculpturing of the form using many layers of different paints.

From 1918 to 1928, Falk taught at VKhUTEMAS (State Higher Artistic and Technical Workshops). In 1928, Falk went on a supposedly short trip to France and refused to return; he worked in Paris until 1938.

== Paris ==
In 1928, Robert Falk was sent to Paris by the USSR's People's Commissariat for Education, which was also in charge of all cultural issues, "to study the classical heritage in painting."

The "Paris decade" (1928–1937) brought the artist new impressions, a new state of mind, a new style and technique. Many art historians believe that this period became the pinnacle of Robert's work: "It was here that his brush acquired a special instability, airiness, lightness." In Paris, Falk found a new style of painting, unstable and airy. The paintings seem to be filled with the French spring air and floral scents.

In Paris, Falk led an almost student existence. He found an inexpensive studio, and gave private lessons in drawing and music (he was a pianist).

In Paris, Falk created more than three hundred urban landscapes and landscapes of the Bois de Boulogne and the city's environs, Longjumeau, Neuilly-sur-Marne, Neuilly-sur-Seine. He painted small cafes on narrow streets, the Seine embankments, bridges over the Seine, canals with barges. The artist gave a very expressive description of Paris: "This is not a city, but a whole country, each quarter is a separate city."

In his early work, Falk experienced a strong passion for Cezanne. In Paris, he again became a Cezannist. Falk went to the places where his favorite artist had been - to Mount Sainte-Victoire. "Cézanne's precision haunted me," he wrote about this trip. But Falk does not repeat Cezanne, but seeks his own techniques.

He worked as a designer of the Soviet pavilion at the Exposition Internationale des Arts et Techniques dans la Vie Moderne de 1937. During his visit to the pavillon espagnol de l'Exposition In the Paris universelle, Falk met with Pablo Picasso and Dora Maar, who were hanging "Guernica". After this, Falk visited Picasso in his apartment on Rue des Grands Augustins, and also met Paul Rosenberg there, and later his brother Léonce Rosenberg. However, these few meetings did not go beyond that, and there was no further interaction - just as Falk's meetings with Louis Vauxcelles, the artists Moïse Kisling, Marc Chagall, Sonia Delaunay, Marie Laurencin, and the poets and philosophers André Salmon, Jean Cocteau, André Breton, and Paul Eluard did not lead to the emergence of a real friendship and interaction. Falk never really managed to fit into the French artistic world.

Life in Paris gradually began to change: the economic crisis, the proximity of war, the threat of the spread of fascism. "I expected a lot from Paris and received a lot from it, I became stronger as an artist. But it became increasingly difficult to work, a feeling of decline and catastrophe set in." Despite professional success and the comfort of Parisian life, the artist was tormented by nostalgia. Falk returned to Moscow in 1937. Many of his French friends did not understand this act. He himself was also well aware that he could be arrested. But the artist faced a vital task that overcame any fear: he dreamed of bringing his paintings to Russia and seeing them in Russian museums.

== Return to Moscow and later life ==
After 1938, until his death in 1958 he worked in Moscow, most of the time in isolation. His works of that time were in neo-impressionist style with characteristic white-on-white colors (not unlike the later paintings of his teacher Valentin Serov).

During the Khrushchev Thaw Falk became popular among young painters and many considered him to be the main bridge between the traditions of the Russian and French Moderne of the beginning of 20th century and Russian avant-garde and the Russian avant-garde of the 1960s.

There are numerous paintings by Falk in the New Tretyakov Gallery in Moscow.

== Style ==
Robert Falk was influenced by Rembrandt in his use of color and light. Falk considered Rembrandt to be the most significant influence on his own work, even more than that of Cézanne.

== Gallery ==
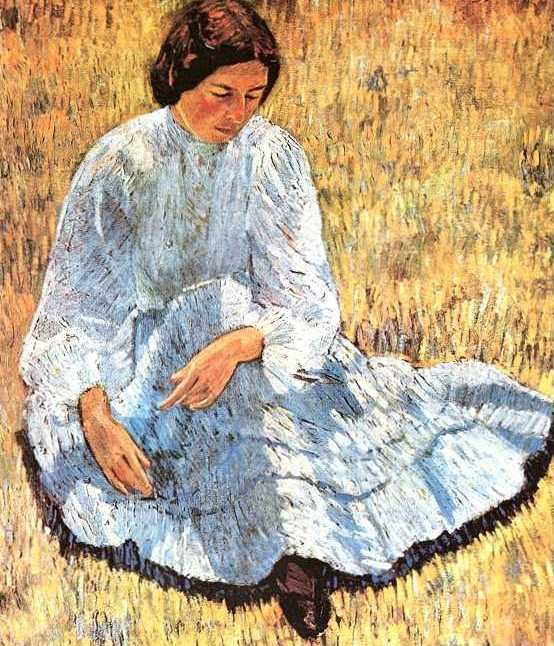
Lisa au soleil, 1907

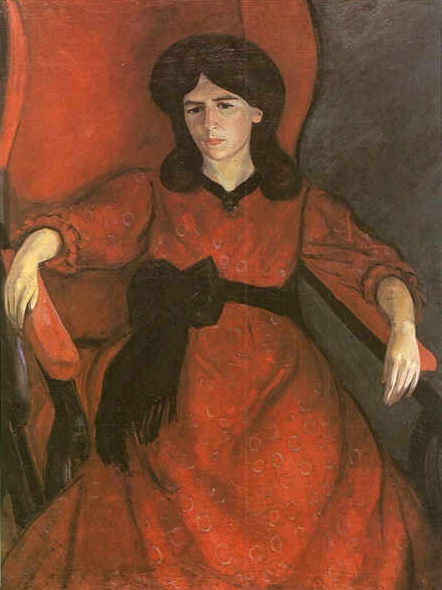
Lisa sur une chaise, 1910

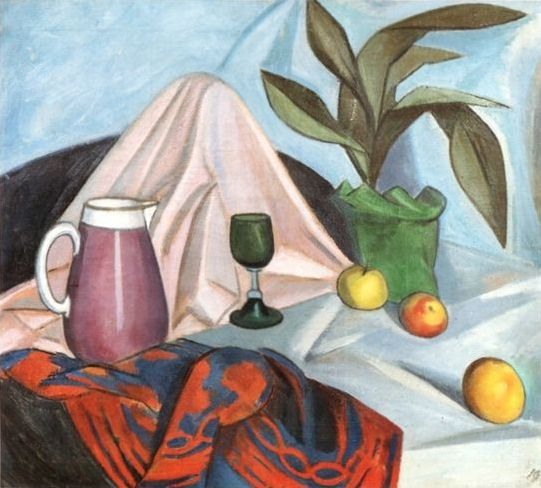
Nature morte, 1910

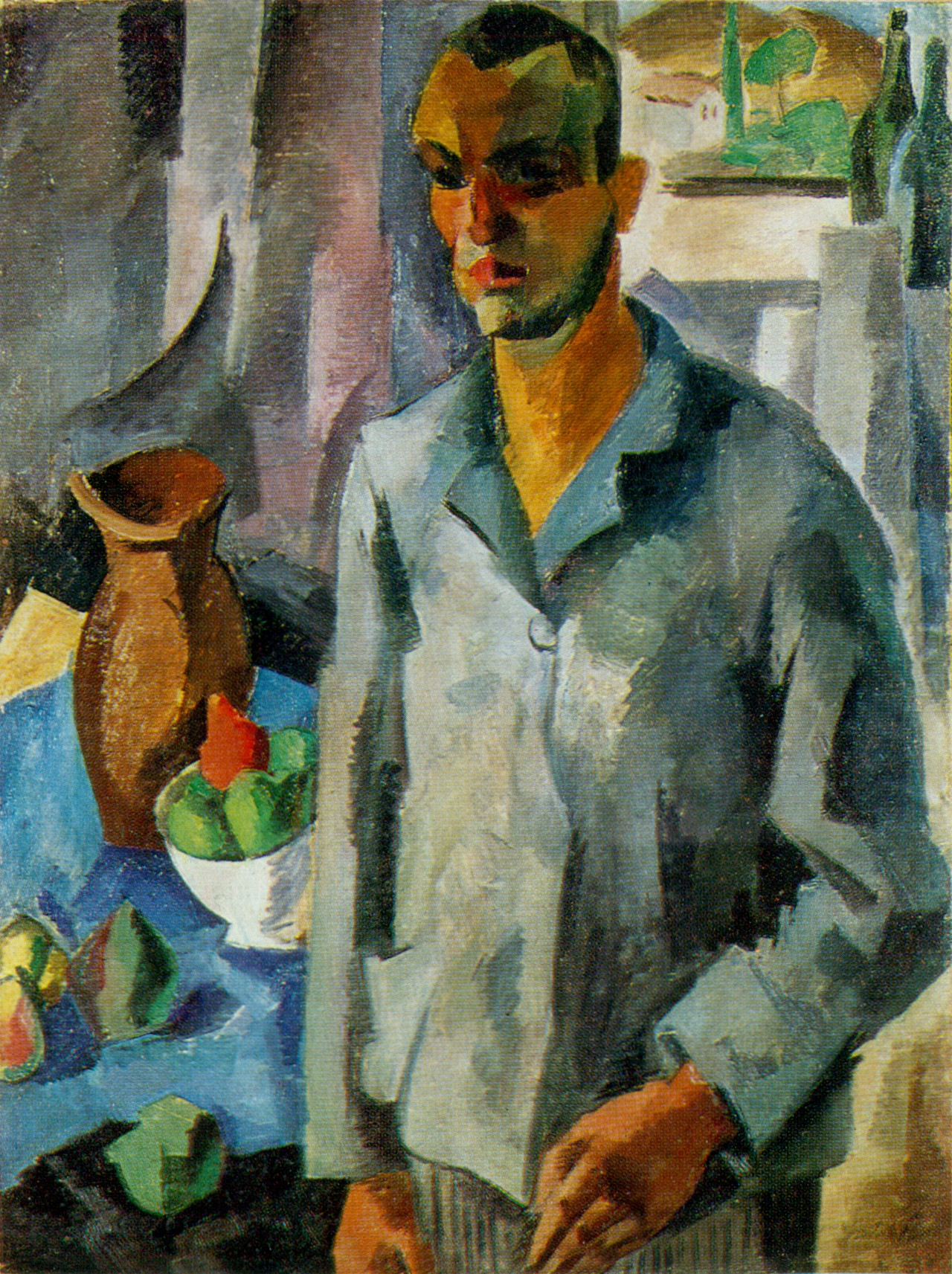
Robert Falk - Self Portrait Against a Window (1916)

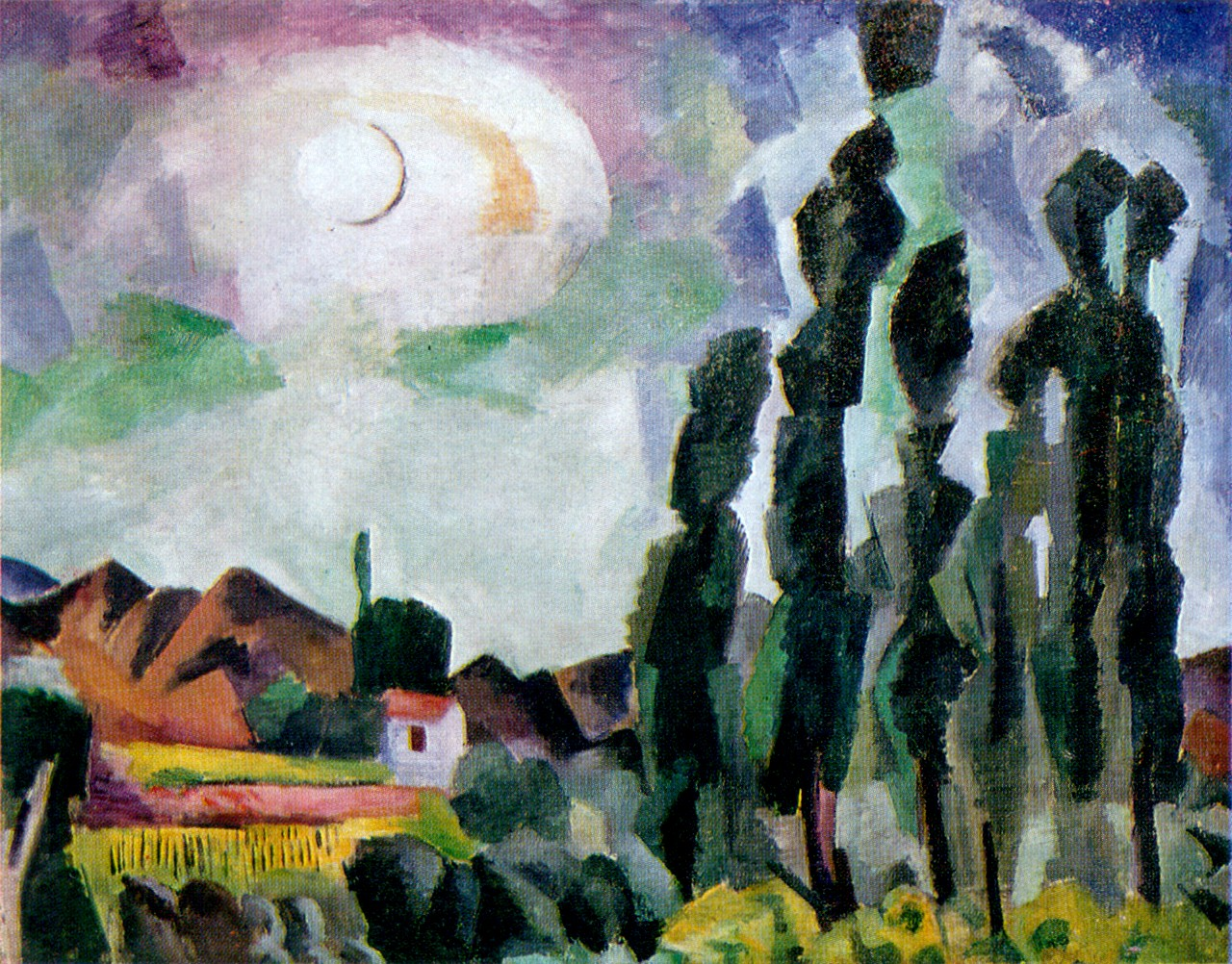
Le soleil en Crimée, 1916

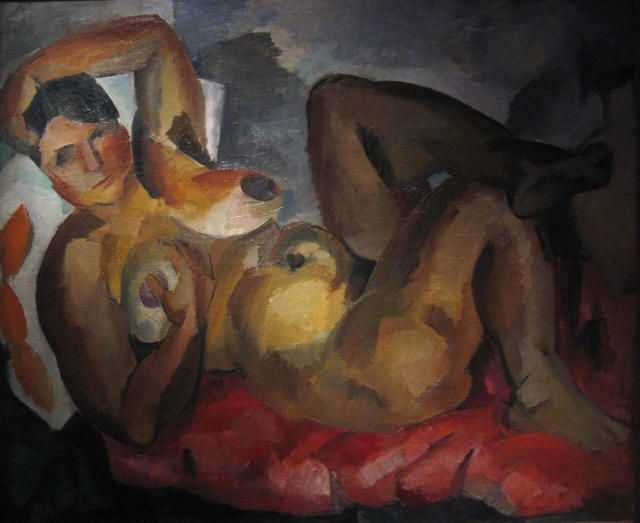
Nu, 1916

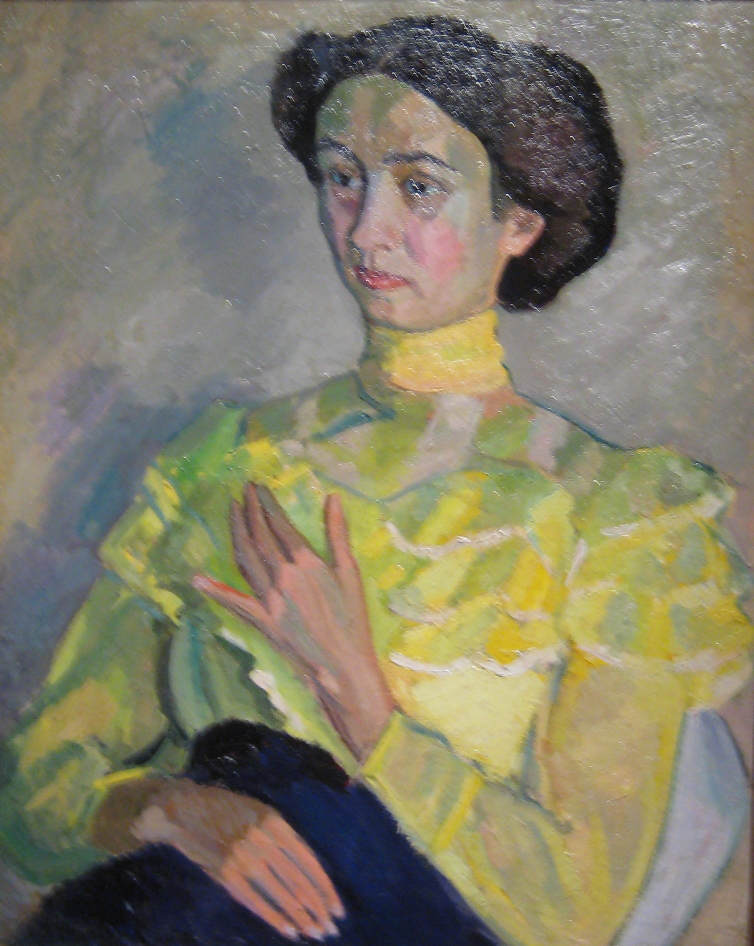
Femme en jaune, 1910

== References and sources ==
Sources

- L'avant-garde russe : chefs-d'œuvre des musées de Russie, 1905-1925 : Exposition au Musée des beaux-arts de Nantes, 30 janvier-18 avril 1993, R.M.N., 1993, p. 102 ISBN 2711827402
- Jean-Claude Marcadé, L'avant-garde russe 1907-1927, Flammarion, 2007. ISBN 978-2-0812-0786-8.
- Valentine Marcadé, Le Renouveau de l'art pictural russe, Édition l'Âge d'homme, Lausanne, 1971
- Camilla Gray, L'Avant-garde russe dans l'art moderne, 1863-1922, Édition Thames et Hudson, 2003. ISBN 2-87811-218-0.
- Robert Falk. Conversations sur l'art. Courrier. Souvenirs d'un artiste. Moscou, Maison d'édition des artistes soviétiques, 1981. (Р.Р. Фальк. Беседы об искусстве. Письма. Воспоминания о художнике. Москва, издательство «Советский художник», 1981.)
- Tchaïkovskaya, Vera. Trois visages de l'art russe du XXe siècle : Robert Falk, Kuzma Petrov-Vodkin, Alexander Samokhvalov. Moscou, Maison d'édition Art-XXIe siècle, 2006. (Чайковская, Вера Исааковна. Три лика русского искусства XX века: Роберт Фальк, Кузьма Петров-Водкин, Александр Самохвалов. Москва, издательство «Искусство-XXI век», 2006).
- Didenko Ioulia, «Robert Falk à Paris. Souvenirs de l'artiste Tatiana Verkhovskaïa (1895-1980), épouse du deuxième secrétaire de l'ambassade de l'URSS en France, Evgueni Girshfeld. Moscou, « Journal de la Galerie Tretiakov », n° 4, 2020. (Юлия Викторовна Диденко, «Роберт Фальк в Париже. Воспоминания художницы Татьяны Верховской)
- Didenko Ioulia. La jetée des « Calmes Valet de Carreau » dans la Maison Pertsov // M., Russian Art, vol. II, 2005. (Диденко Ю. Пристань «тихих бубновых валетов» в Доме Перцова // М., Русское искусство, т. II, 2005).
- Роберт Фальк. Каталог-резоне. Сост.: Юлия Диденко, отв. ред.: Татьяна Карпова. Москва, Государственная Третьяковская галерея, 2021. ISBN 978-5-89580-309-7.
- Роберт Фальк: живопись : дополнения к каталогу-резоне. Editor, Юлия Диденко. Compiled by, Юлия Диденко. Publisher, Tri kvadrata, 2018. ISBN, 5946072129
- Диденко Ю.В. Живопись Роберта Фалька. Полный каталог живописных произведений. Москва, Компьютер-Пресс, 2006.
- Robert Rafailovich Falk. Moscow, Palace editions, 2012. ISBN 978-5881495893
- Роберт Фальк. Москва, издательство “Третьяковская галерея”, 2020.
- Из жизни рядом с Фальком. В кн. Д. В. Сарабьянова «Robert Falk». На немецком языке. Дрезден, 1974.
- Щекин-Кротова А. В. Становление художника // Новый мир. 1983. № 10
- Щекин-Кротова А. В. Люди и образы. Биографии и легенды. Из цикла «Модели Фалька» // Панорама искусств. Выпуск 8. — М.: Советский художник, 1985.
- Истратова А. Свидание с юностью // М., Русское искусство, т. II, 2005.
- Успенский А. Роберт Фальк. Счастье живописца. М.: Искусство XXI век, 2020.

== Annexes ==
=== Bibliographie ===
- Jean-Claude Marcadé, L'avant-garde russe 1907-1927, Flammarion, 2007. ISBN 978-2-0812-0786-8.
- Valentine Marcadé, Le Renouveau de l'art pictural russe, Édition l'Âge d'homme, Lausanne, 1971
- Camilla Gray, L'Avant-garde russe dans l'art moderne, 1863-1922, Édition Thames et Hudson, 2003. ISBN 2-87811-218-0.
- Robert Falk. Conversations sur l'art. Courrier. Souvenirs d'un artiste. Moscou, Maison d'édition des artistes soviétiques, 1981. (Р.Р. Фальк. Беседы об искусстве. Письма. Воспоминания о художнике. Москва, издательство «Советский художник», 1981.)
- Tchaïkovskaya, Vera. Trois visages de l'art russe du XXe siècle : Robert Falk, Kuzma Petrov-Vodkin, Alexander Samokhvalov. Moscou, Maison d'édition Art-XXIe siècle, 2006. (Чайковская, Вера Исааковна. Три лика русского искусства XX века: Роберт Фальк, Кузьма Петров-Водкин, Александр Самохвалов. Москва, издательство «Искусство-XXI век», 2006).
- Didenko Ioulia, «Robert Falk à Paris. Souvenirs de l'artiste Tatiana Verkhovskaïa (1895-1980), épouse du deuxième secrétaire de l'ambassade de l'URSS en France, Evgueni Girshfeld. Moscou, « Journal de la Galerie Tretiakov », n° 4, 2020. (Юлия Викторовна Диденко, «Роберт Фальк в Париже. Воспоминания художницы Татьяны Верховской)
- Didenko Ioulia. La jetée des « Calmes Valet de Carreau » dans la Maison Pertsov // M., Russian Art, vol. II, 2005. (Диденко Ю. Пристань «тихих бубновых валетов» в Доме Перцова // М., Русское искусство, т. II, 2005).
- Роберт Фальк. Каталог-резоне. Сост.: Юлия Диденко, отв. ред.: Татьяна Карпова. Москва, Государственная Третьяковская галерея, 2021. ISBN 978-5-89580-309-7.
- Роберт Фальк: живопись : дополнения к каталогу-резоне. Editor, Юлия Диденко. Compiled by, Юлия Диденко. Publisher, Tri kvadrata, 2018. ISBN, 5946072129
- Диденко Ю.В. Живопись Роберта Фалька. Полный каталог живописных произведений. Москва, Компьютер-Пресс, 2006.
- Robert Rafailovich Falk. Moscow, Palace editions, 2012. ISBN 978-5881495893
- Роберт Фальк. Москва, издательство “Третьяковская галерея”, 2020.
- Из жизни рядом с Фальком. В кн. Д. В. Сарабьянова «Robert Falk». На немецком языке. Дрезден, 1974.
- Щекин-Кротова А. В. Становление художника // Новый мир. 1983. № 10
- Щекин-Кротова А. В. Люди и образы. Биографии и легенды. Из цикла «Модели Фалька» // Панорама искусств. Выпуск 8. — М.: Советский художник, 1985.
- Истратова А. Свидание с юностью // М., Русское искусство, т. II, 2005.
- Успенский А. Роберт Фальк. Счастье живописца. М.: Искусство XXI век, 2020.
