= Vasily Rozhdestvensky =

Russian and Soviet painter

- Василий Васильевич Рождественский
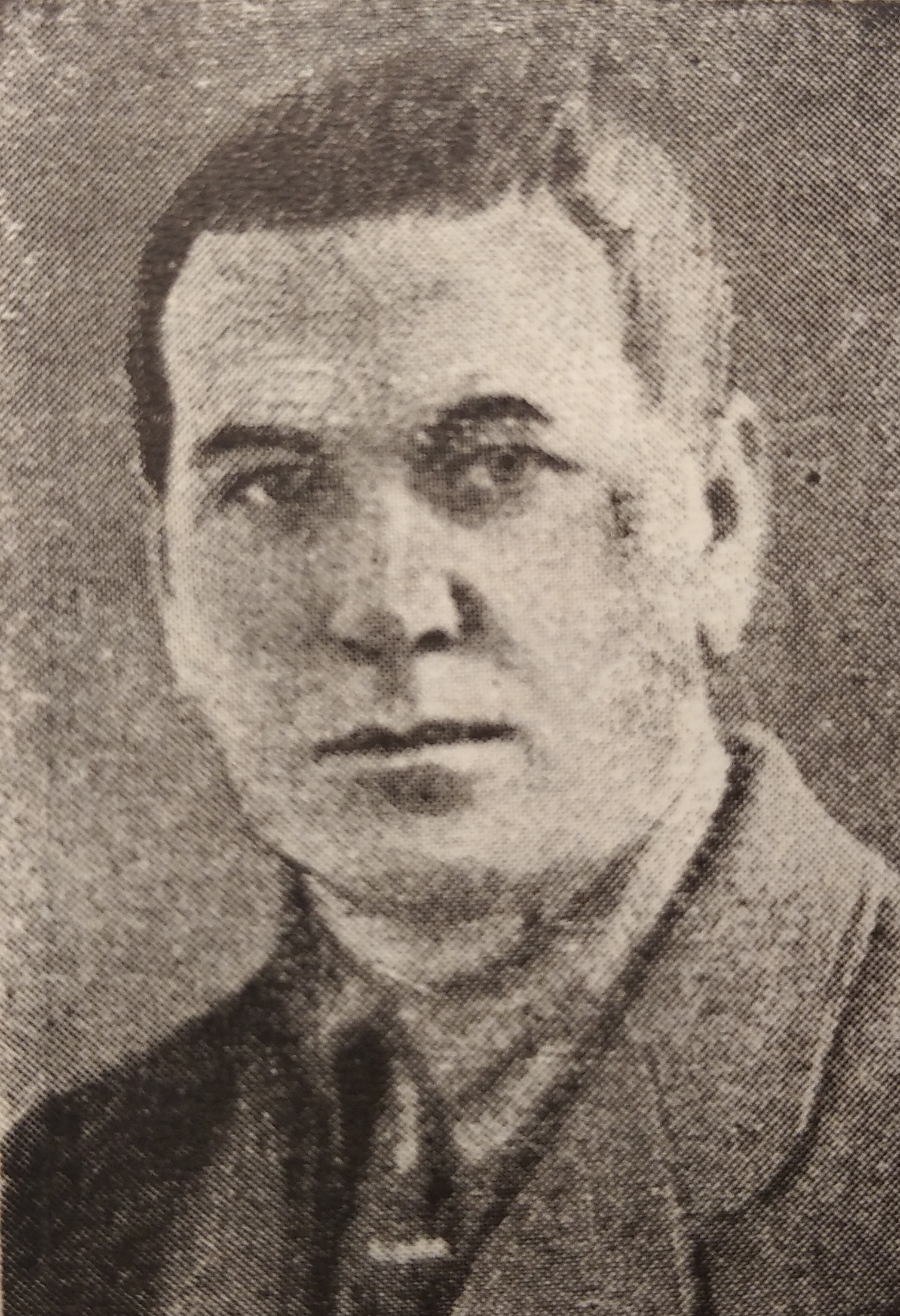
- Photo of Rozhdestvensky
- Born: 12 May 1884; Tula, Tula Governorate, Russian Empire
- Died: 20 May 1963 (aged 79); Moscow, Russian SFSR, Soviet Union
- Resting place: Vagankovskoye Cemetery, Moscow
- Education: VKhUTEMAS
- Occupations: Painter; graphic artist; sculptor
- Spouse: Natalia Rozhdestvenskaya (1899 — 1975)

Vasily Vasilyevich Rozhdestvensky (Василий Васильевич Рождественский) (May 12, 1884 – May 20, 1963) was a Russian and Soviet painter, graphic artist and educator, a founding member of Knave of Diamonds, regarded as one of important Russian modernist painters of the first half of the 20th century. Author of the book of memoirs Notes of an Artist (1963).

== Life and career ==
Vasily Rozhdestvensky was born in provincial Tula, in the family of a career Russian Orthodox priest, just like his Knave of Diamonds colleague Aristarkh Lentulov. He began studying at the Tula Theological School (1896–1900), intent on continuing his family dynasty of priests. But the penchant for painting which he felt since childhood made him quit the theological school when only one year was left before obtaining the diploma, and go to Moscow in 1900 to study at the Moscow School of Painting, Sculpture and Architecture. His family was profoundly shocked by this sudden reversal and refused to support Rozhdestvensky, so at first he felt dire need. However, his teachers Valentin Serov, Konstantin Korovin and Abram Arkhipov quickly discerned his natural talent and encouraged him to carry on studying. However, the art studies were interrupted by the First Russian Revolution of 1905, when Moscow was dotted with barricades and subjected to martial law, and all schools were closed for an indefinite time, including Moscow School of Painting. Rozhdestvensky had to return to Tula – only to find his entire family get radicalized after the untimely death of his priestly father, with all his brothers and even sisters engaged in underground struggle against the tzarist regime of Russian Empire, either as Social Democrats or members of Party of Socialist-Revolutionaries.

Belonging to such a family, he had almost no choice but to engage in street protests and demonstrations in his native Tula. In the midst of revolutionary demonstrations, the Rozhdestvenskys made an almost anecdotal journey to listen to Leo Tolstoy preaching in his nearby estate at Yasnaya Polyana, travelling there with a self-made primitive bomb they scraped to assemble to dramatically accelerate the arrival of a new just order. However, the bomb was too primitive to explode, while Tolstoy's preaching of Mahatma Gandhi-style non-violent changes forced the ashamed revolutionaries to get rid of the failed explosive device immediately after listening to his lecture. Nevertheless, such vigorous activity of Rozhdestvensky could not fail to attract the attention of the police, who landed him into Tula prison, together with the other members of his revolutionary family. In 1907, he was set free due to amnesty declared by Emperor Nicholas II, and could resume his studies. In his memoir he noted: "Having paid for my love of freedom with imprisonment, having served time behind bars, I again turned to my beloved art, continuing my studies at the Moscow School of Painting".

The political revolution in Russia was suppressed, but it nevertheless spread into the sphere of art. Rozhdestvensky's mentors Konstantin Korovin and Valentin Serov took him to the luxurious palaces of Sergei Shchukin and Ivan Morozov where the students became acquainted with the greatest collection of modern French painters outside France – with the emblematic canvases of Auguste Renoir, Henri Matisse, Paul Gauguin, Paul Cezanne, Pablo Picasso, Henri Rousseau, André Derain. The revelation of modern French art made the most profound shock effect on Rozhdestvensky and completely changed his art manner. He became acquainted with other School of Painting students who also embraced the latest art tendencies such as Mikhail Larionov, Natalia Goncharova, Pyotr Konchalovsky, Ilya Mashkov, Robert Falk, Alexander V. Kuprin. The discovery of French art and friendship with these cutting-edge artists-to-be shaped Rozhdestvensky's future destiny.

Valentin Serov who had started his career by painting the royal portraits of Tzar Nicholas II and his family members, felt all the more frustrated by the cruel suppression of revolution of 1905 and the growing reaction. The last drop was the School of Painting denial to admit as its student the talented female sculptor Anna Golubkina who distributed Social Democrat leaflets and carved the first Karl Marx bust in Russia. In 1909 Serov quit the School where he had been teaching for the last 20 years, and soon afterwards the School administration decided to cleanse its ranks, removing the most notorious troublemakers from art, the rebellious Cezanneists who disturbed the serene roseate atmosphere of the old academy with their bold experiments in the spirit of Fauvism and Cubism. The exiles were Mikhail Larionov, Pyotr Konchalovsky, Robert Falk, Alexander V. Kuprin and Vasily Rozhdestvensky, expelled in 1909 for the breach of discipline. Soon, Ilya Mashkov was also expelled, according to the official version – for failure to pay for tuition, according to the artist himself – for innovation in painting.

However, the expulsion from the alma mater was not the beginning of the end, but the path to fame and recognition for young artists. Having been deprived of all support and left to their own devices, they, on the contrary, felt that their creative powers had been liberated, as now they ceased to depend on everything that had hitherto fettered and hindered them. So they decided to make a bold move, proclaiming the creation of a new style in Russian painting, and declaring the apostles of this new style. As they were officially persecuted rejects, they united in a group with the provocative name Knave of Diamonds, which was invented by Mikhail Larionov and Aristarkh Lentulov, which in Russian classical tradition meant rebellion, disobedience, challenge and audacity of youth, a sheer break with everything that existed in the realm of painting of that time - and this group was destined to become the most striking and significant phenomenon in Russian painting of the 20th century.

Pyotr Konchalovsky became the chairman of “Knave of Diamonds”, Ilya Mashkov – secretary, Alexander V. Kuprin – treasurer, Rozhdestvensky – member of the board. The first exhibition was held from December 10, 1910, to January 16, 1911, and also featured Natalia Goncharova, Kazimir Malevich, Wassily Kandinsky, French cubist paintings by Henri Le Fauconnier, André Lhote, Albert Gleizes and Jean Metzinger. Contemporaries called it "an exhibition of madness", the first "slap in the face of public taste" – which became the reason for the popularity and further fame of the artists.

== Studying French Art in its Heartland ==
The expulsion of the artists from the School of Painting meant that they lost their military service deferment, so Rozhdestvensky was sent to military encampment near Mozhaisk to be drilled as the future artillery officer. This brought him even closer to Konchalovsky who was put through the same drilling there. In the evenings, Konchalovsky told Rozhdestvensky about his studies in Paris at Académie Julian, together with Albert Gleizes, and how he found his own path in art when he came to France in 1907 and was captivated by Paul Cezanne and Vincent van Gogh and decided to base himself on their findings. When they completed their military training and became artillery reserve warrant officer, Rozhdestvensky and Pyotr Konchalovsky went together to France and then Italy, where they painted views of Cassis and Siena side by side. Rozhdestvensky also travelled with Ilya Mashkov to Monaco, Switzerland, Liechenstein and the German Empire.

== The First World War ==
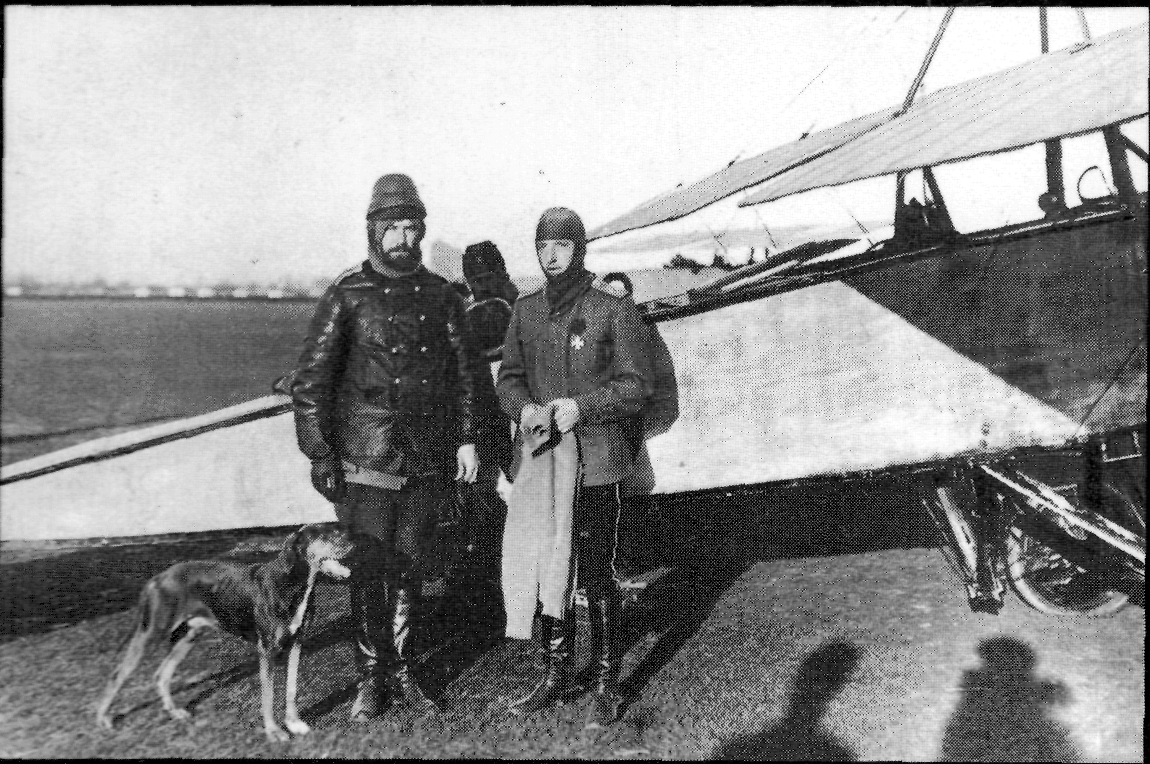
Rozhdestvensky at the front of an airplane.

At the start of WWI in 1914 Rozhdestvensky was called up for military service in the artillery and fought from 1914 to 1917 – longer than any of his fellow artists. He fought with the Siberian Corps in East Prussia in 1914. In 1915, he became Captain and continued fighting in East Prussia, near Przasnysz. For taking this town from Paul von Hindenburg's troops, he was mentioned in the Emperor's rescript and got an award. In 1916, Rozhdestvensky participated in General Brusilov's assault near Zborov. He was lucky not to be severely wounded, but when he was demobilized towards the end of 1917, he found himself in entirely different situation as a painter. As an artist, he had half-dropped out of the artistic life while it had quickly evolved. The "Jack of Diamonds" society went through several crises and finally fall apart in 1917. While the author was in the active army, his paintings were exhibited in 1915 at the "Exhibition of Contemporary Russian Painting" and in 1916, but the October revolution of 1917 shattered all former society foundations.

However, the old connections he had cultivated with the most radical part of Knave of Diamonds played out well. While Mikhail Larionov and Natalia Goncharova who had emigrated to France before the revolution and preferred to stay there afterwards were labelled as "traitors", Kazimir Malevich, Vladimir Tatlin, Wassily Kandinsky and Robert Falk were elected to the Painting section of the Department of Visual Arts of Soviet Ministry of Culture. When Soviet culture minister Anatoly Lunacharsky decreed to create Museums of Painting Culture throughout the country, in order to acquaint the Soviet people with best examples of progressive art and improve the general state of culture, the Moscow Museum of Painting Culture was headed by Wassily Kandinsky, and Rozhdestvensky was included in the list of 38 best Russian painters whose canvases were selected to adorn the walls of new museums.

He also returned to his former alma mater, the Moscow School of Painting, now renamed into "State Free Art Workshops", now as a professor, and taught there along with Kazimir Malevich and his former mentors Konstantin Korovin and Abram Arkhipov. Thus his art style got absolute recognition and acknowledgment. However, deep inside Rozhdestvensky had a staunch premonition that the triumph of modern art and artistic freedom granted immediately after the revolution could not be lasting, and that the truly hard times only lay ahead. That dictated his personal strategy of calculated escapism which was to seal the rest of his life. In 1918, he started this strategy by accepting the position of professor at the State Free Art Workshops distant outpost on the shore of Lake Udomlya in Tver province, long considered a "Russian Barbizon" by many painters. Thus he distanced himself from Moscow and Leningrad and the future battles in art sphere that forced Wassily Kandinsky, Marc Chagall, Boris Anisfeld, Ivan Puni, Konstantin Korovin, Konstantin Somov, Alexandra Exter, Leonid Pasternak into exile, and ousted Kazimir Malevich from all posts, leading to his untimely death.

== Travelling to Central Asia and Russian North ==
As the authorities began their crusade against the "formalist art" and "bourgeois Cézanne perversions in art", Rozhdestvensky with his wife, folklorist and anthropologist and poet Natalia Rozhdestvenskaya (1899 — 1975) decided to engage in a kind of escapism – they traveled a lot around the country, visiting Crimea, the Caucasus, Karelia, Central Asia, Altai Mountains and since 1930s the Archangelsk region, the village Lopshenga on the coast of the White Sea and river Pinega. He painted those villages and natural scenery, and his wife as ethnographer wrote down tales, folklore, songs, and collected rural household items. The Rozhdestvenskys made friends with famous Russian North folklorist Boris Shergin and tales author Pavel Bazhov.

== The last of the "Knave of Diamonds" ==
Although his own strategy of "calculated seclusion" allowed Rozhdestvensky to escape persecution, the artist could not remain indifferent to the systematic harassment and virtual ban on the artistic profession in relation to his closest friends – Alexander Osmerkin, Alexander Shevchenko, Vladimir Tatlin.

The end of WW2 gave Rozhdestvensky some hope for the restoration of justice, and in 1947 Rozhdestvensky wrote a detailed note to the Secretary of the Central Committee Andrei Zhdanov, whom Stalin had appointed to be in charge of Soviet culture, in which he insisted that classifying Russian avant-garde artists and Cezannists as hostile bourgeois currents that needed to be eradicated was a tragic mistake, and that all these artists constituted a golden era in the history of national painting. But in response, Rozhdestvensky received a harsh dressing down with an explanation of his "unforgivable mistakes", which almost ended with his own expulsion from the Union of Artists. Rozhdestvensky made a new attempt to restore the good name of the Russian avant-garde after Stalin's death in 1953. The following year, 1954, he wrote detailed, reasoned letters to the formal head of state Klement Voroshilov, the Minister of Culture Panteleimon Ponomarenko, members of the Politburo Georgy Malenkov, Anastas Mikoyan, in which he called for abandoning the course of persecuting avant-garde artists and placing them in the camp of "outcast" artists, to stop attacks on formalist artists and their works, and pointed out the tragic fate of formalist artists, who in fact made an exceptional contribution to national art. Following the tectonic shift in Soviet politics and culture that occurred in 1956, after the 20th Party Congress and Khrushchev's "Secret Speech" there, denouncing Stalin, the former reactionary leadership of the Moscow Union of Artists was rejected by the general assembly of Moscow artists, and Rozhdestvensky and Falk were elected to the new board of the Moscow Union of Soviet Artists in October 1956. This caused panic among party officials, including the USSR Minister of Culture Nikolai Mikhailov, who began bombarding Khrushchev with notes claiming that "formalist elements that have raised their heads are trying to lead the creative unions and impose their erroneous program on them." For Rozhdestvensky, this became a way to restore the good name of his colleagues in the "Knave of Diamonds", rehabilitate their art, and get their previously banned works shown to a wider public. Rozhdestvensky knew he had to hurry because after Aristarkh Lentulov died in 1943, Ilya Mashkov in 1944, Aleksandr Shevchenko in 1948, Alexander Osmerkin and Vladimir Tatlin in 1953, Pyotr Konchalovsky in 1956, Robert Falk in 1958, Aleksandr V. Kuprin in 1960, Natalia Goncharova in 1962, he was the last living Knave of Diamonds member left in Russia. He fought for his colleagues' remembrance like a real knight, and his memoirs Notes of an Artist, which he had been writing during the last decades of his life and which was published two months after his death, is testimony to it.

He died in Moscow on May 20, 1963. He was buried at Vagankovskoye Cemetery.

His pictures are in State Tretyakov Gallery, State Russian Museum, Tula Regional Art Museum, I. V. Savitsky Karakalpak State Museum of Arts in Nukus in Uzbekistan and others.

== Selected pictures ==
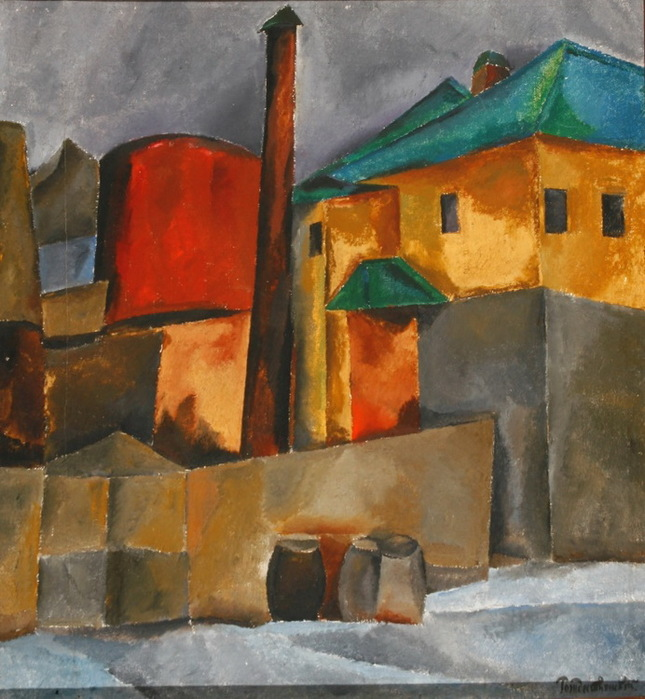
Provincial landscape (1910)

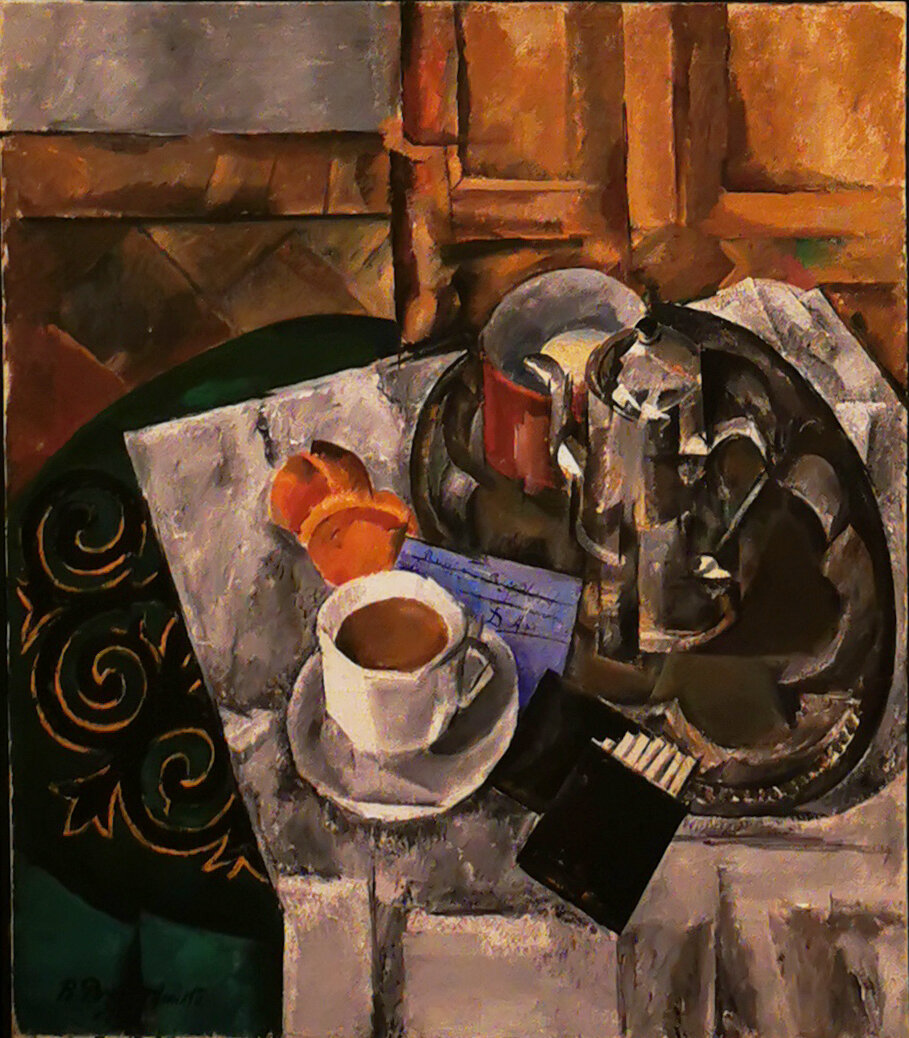
Still life with coffee pot and cup (1913)

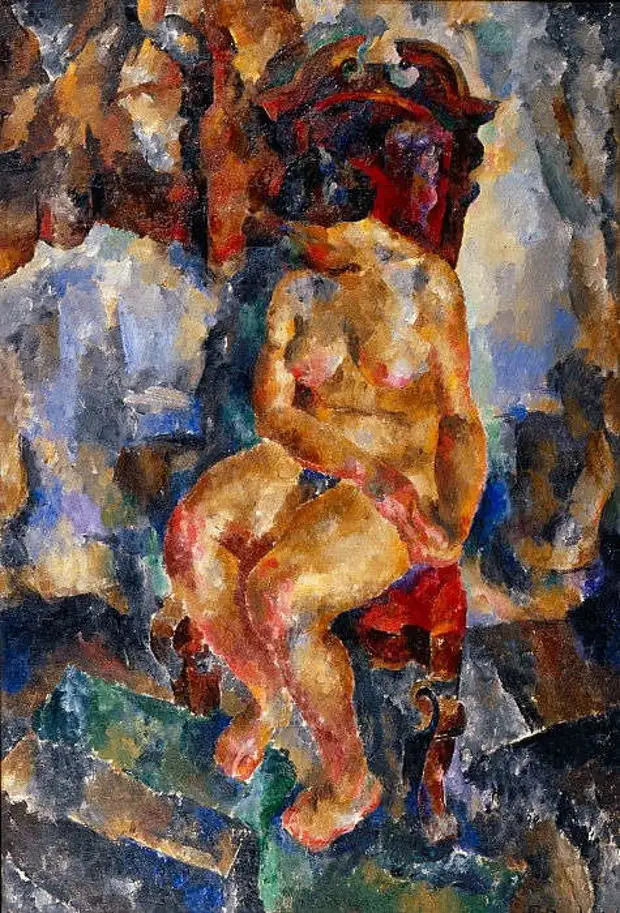
Seated Nude (1910)

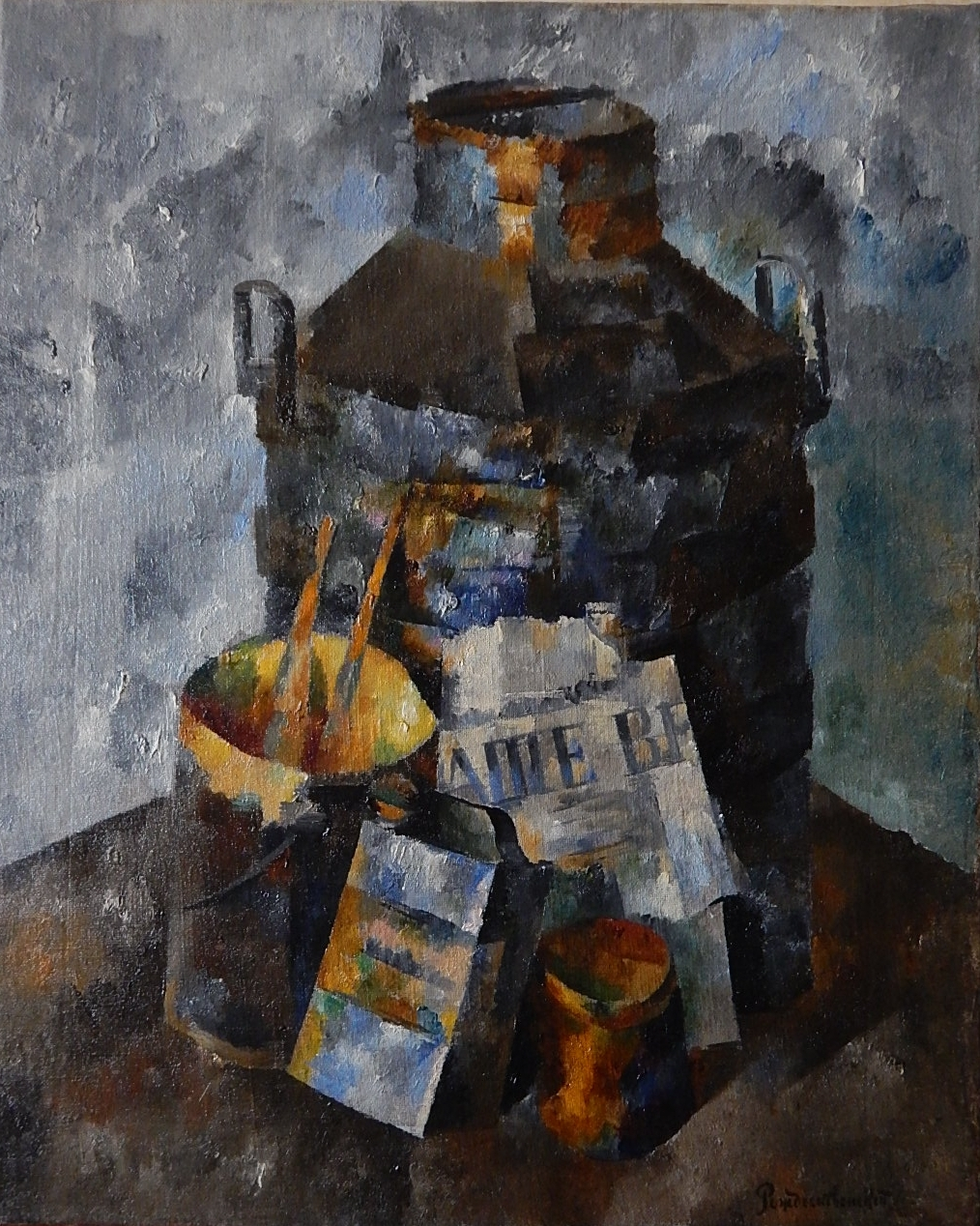
Still Life with a Can and Colors (1917)

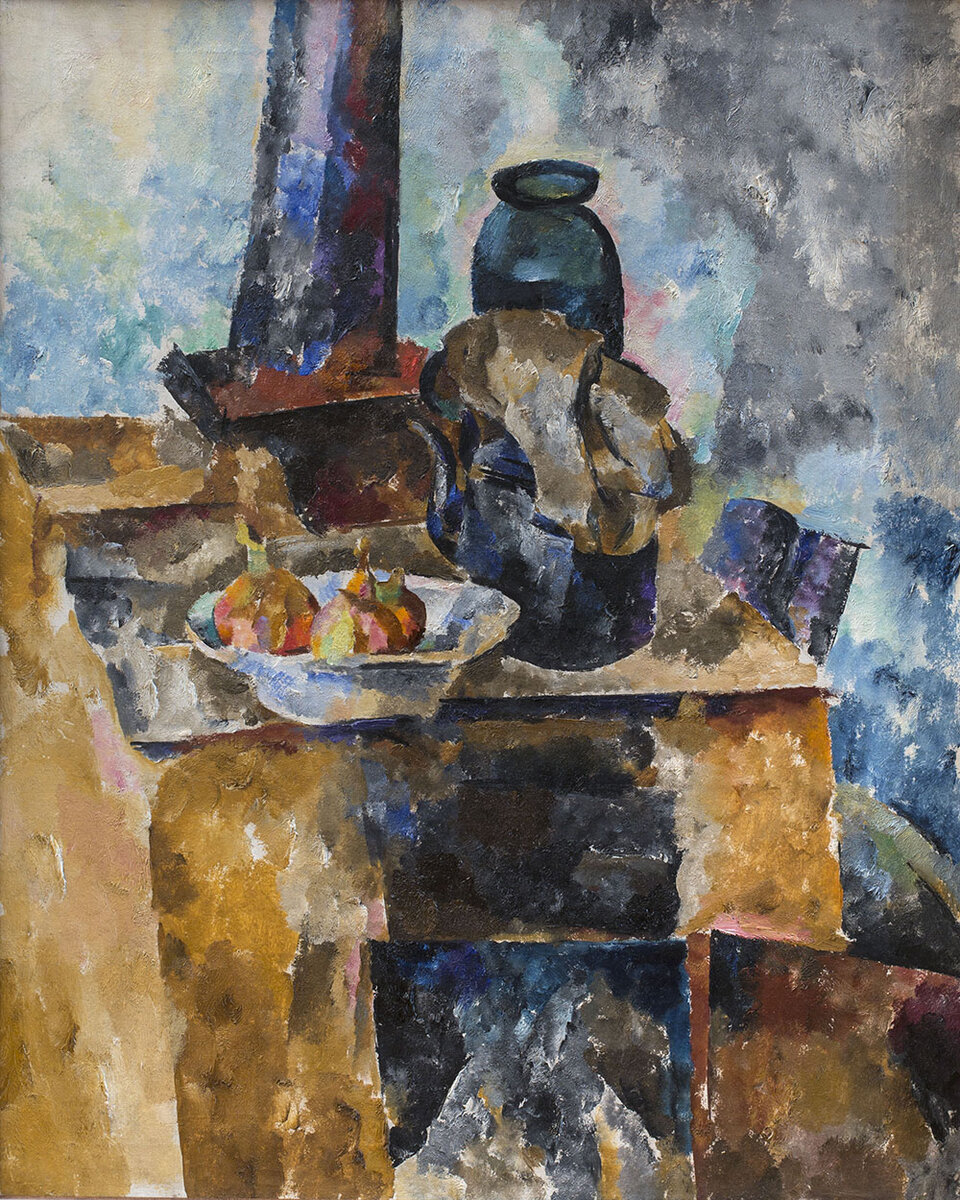
Still Life with a Stove (1918)

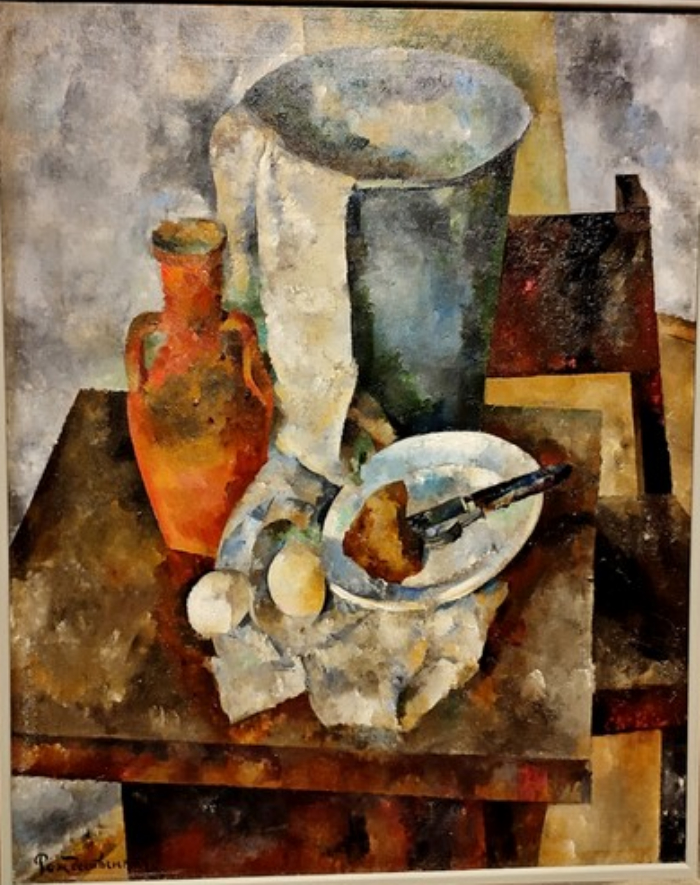
Potato and Jug (1921)

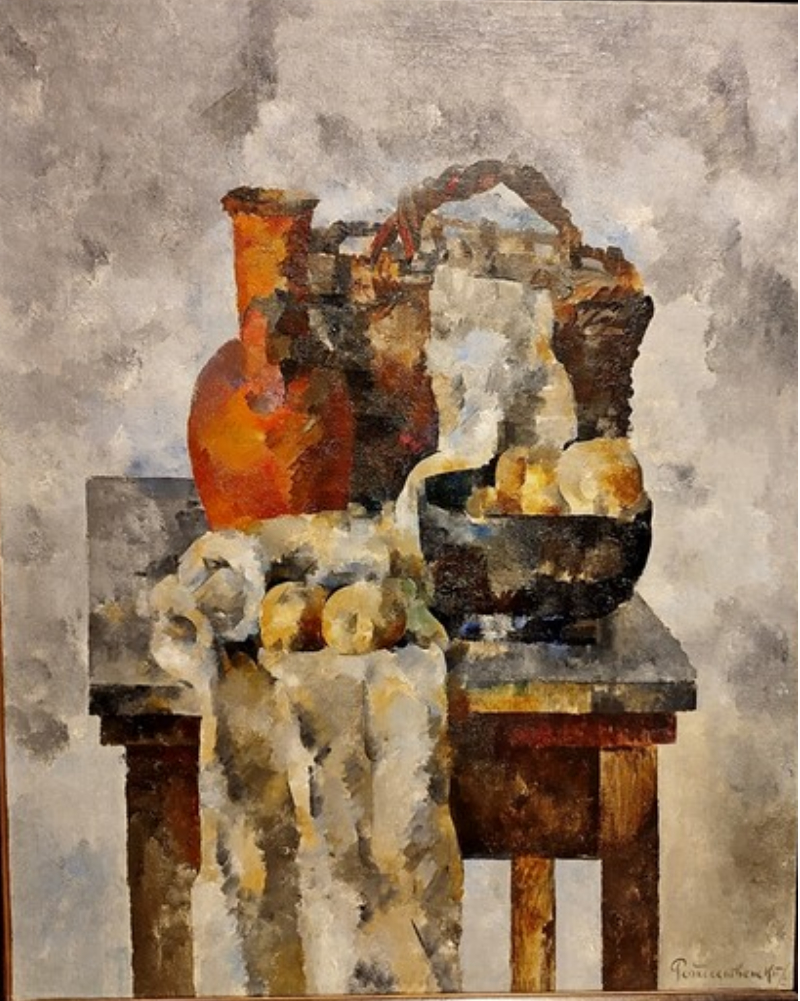
Still Life with a Clay Jug (1921)

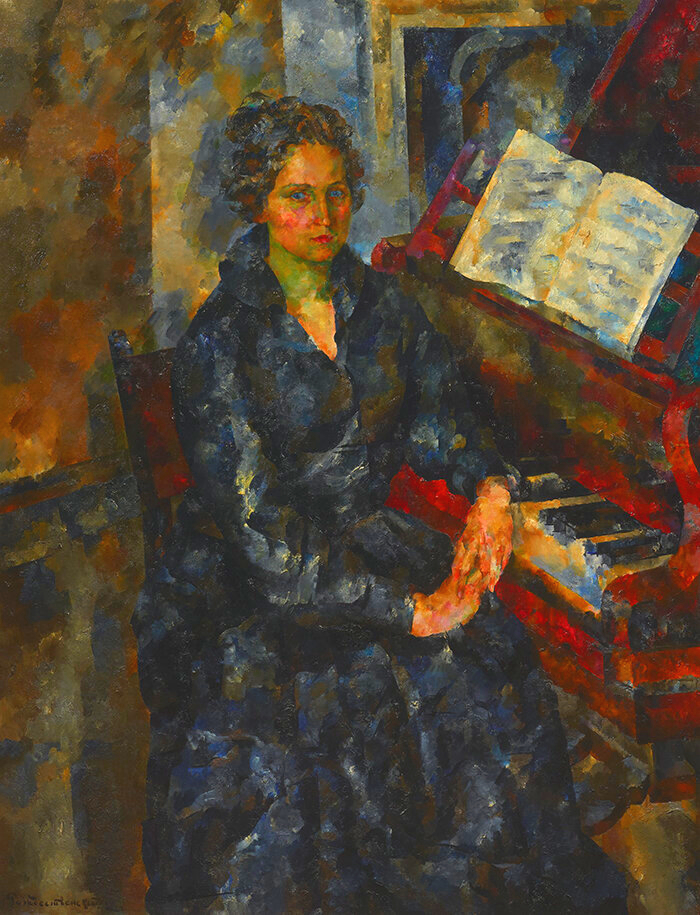
Portrait of the artist's wife Natalia Ivanovna (1922)

== References and sources ==
Sources

- L'avant-garde russe: chefs-d'œuvre des musées de Russie, 1905–1925 : Exposition au Musée des beaux-arts de Nantes, 30 janvier – 18 avril 1993, R.M.N., 1993, ISBN 2-7118-2740-2
- Jean-Claude Marcadé, L'avant-garde russe 1907–1927, Flammarion, 2007. ISBN 978-2-0812-0786-8.
- Valentine Marcadé, Le Renouveau de l'art pictural russe, Édition l'Âge d'homme, Lausanne, 1971
- Camilla Gray, L'Avant-garde russe dans l'art moderne, 1863–1922, Édition Thames et Hudson, 2003. ISBN 2-87811-218-0.
- Evgueny Kovtun. Avant Garde Art in Russia (Schools and Movements). Parkstone Press Ltd, 1998.
- Vasily Rozhdestvensky. Notes of an artist. Moscow, Soviet Artist Publishing House, 1963 (Рождественский В.В. Записки художника. Москва, издательство «Советский художник», 1963)
- Povelikhina Alla, Kovtun Evgeny. Russian pictorial signboard and avant-garde artists. – L.: Aurora, 1991. ISBN 5-7300-0274-2. (Повелихина Алла, Ковтун Евгений. Русская живописная вывеска и художники авангарда. — Л.: Аврора, 1991. ISBN 5-7300-0274-2).
- Murina E. B., Dzhafarova S. G. Aristarkh Lentulov: The Artist's Path. The Artist and Time. Moscow: Soviet Artist, 1990. ISBN 5-269-00095-4. (Мурина Е. Б., Джафарова С. Г. Аристарх Лентулов: Путь художника. Художник и время. М.: Советский художник, 1990. ISBN 5-269-00095-4.)
- Мурина Елена. Ранний авангард. Москва, издательство Галарт, 2008. ISBN 978-5-269-01053-3. (Murina Elena. Early Avant-garde. Moscow, Galart Publishing House, 2008. ISBN 978-5-269-01053-3).
- «Dmitri Sarabjanow. Robert Falk.» Mit einer Dokumentation, Briefen, Gesprächen, Lektionen des Künstler und einer biographischen Übersicht, hrsg. Von A.W. Stschekin-Krotowa. Dresden, Kunst, 1974.
- Faina Balakhovskaya, Vladimir Kruglov, Jean-Claude Marcade, Gleb Pospelov, Dmitry Sarabyanov. Jack of diamonds in the Russian avant-garde. St. Petersburg, Palace Editions, 2004. ISBN 5-93332-143-5. (Фаина Балаховская, Владимир Круглов, Жан-Клод Маркадэ, Глеб Поспелов, Дмитрий Сарабьянов. Бубновый валет в русском авангарде. Санкт-Петербург, Palace Editions, 2004. ISBN 5-93332-143-5).
- Chegodaeva Maria. Socialist realism. Myths and reality. Moscow: Zakharov, 2003. ISBN 5-8159-0277-2 (Чегодаева М. А. Соцреализм. Мифы и реальность. Москва, издательство Захаров, 2003. ISBN 5-8159-0277-2).
- Nakov Andréi. L'avant-garde russe. Moscow, Art Publishers, 1991. ISBN 5-210-02162-9 (Наков А. Русский авангард = L'avant-garde russe. М.: Искусство, 1991. ISBN 5-210-02162-9)
- Russian Art of the Avant-Garde. Theory and Criticism 1902—1934 / Ed. by John E. Bowlt. — New York, 1976.
- Manin, Vitaly. Art in the Reservation. Artistic Life of Russia 1917–1941, Moscow, Editorial URSS Publishing House, 1999, ISBN 5-901006-94-1 (Манин Виталий. Искусство в резервации. Художественная жизнь России 1917—1941 гг., Москва, издательство Едиториал УРСС, 1999, ISBN 5-901006-94-1)
- Manin, Vitaly. Russian Painting of the 20th Century (in 3 volumes), St. Petersburg, Aurora Publishing House, 2007, ISBN 978-5-7300-0824-3 (Манин Виталий. Русская живопись XX века (в 3-х томах), Санкт-Петербург, издательство Аврора, 2007, ISBN 978-5-7300-0824-3)
- Manin, Vitaly. Art and Power. The Struggle of Currents in Soviet Fine Arts 1917–1941, St. Petersburg, Aurora Publishing House, 2008, ISBN 978-5-7300-0874-8 (Манин Виталий. Искусство и власть. Борьба течений в советском изобразительном искусстве 1917—1941 годов, Санкт-Петербург, издательство Аврора, 2008, ISBN 978-5-7300-0874-8)
- Robert Falk. Conversations sur l'art. Courrier. Souvenirs d'un artiste. Moscou, Maison d'édition des artistes soviétiques, 1981. (Р.Р. Фальк. Беседы об искусстве. Письма. Воспоминания о художнике. Москва, издательство «Советский художник», 1981.)
- Didenko Ioulia. La jetée des « Calmes Valet de Carreau » dans la Maison Pertsov // M., Russian Art, vol. II, 2005. (Диденко Ю. Пристань «тихих бубновых валетов» в Доме Перцова // М., Русское искусство, т. II, 2005).
- Истратова А. Свидание с юностью // М., Русское искусство, т. II, 2005.
