= Novodevichii Institute =

School for girls founded by Catherine the Great

The Novodevichii Institute was a Russian school for girls. It was founded by Empress Catherine the Great in 1765.

The establishment of the institute was a significant step in making education available for females in Russia: “The provision of formal education for women began only in 1764 and 1765, when Catherine II established first the Smolny Institute for girls of the nobility in St. Petersburg and then the Novodevichii Institute for the daughters of commoners.”
