= Vasily Kozlov (sculptor) =

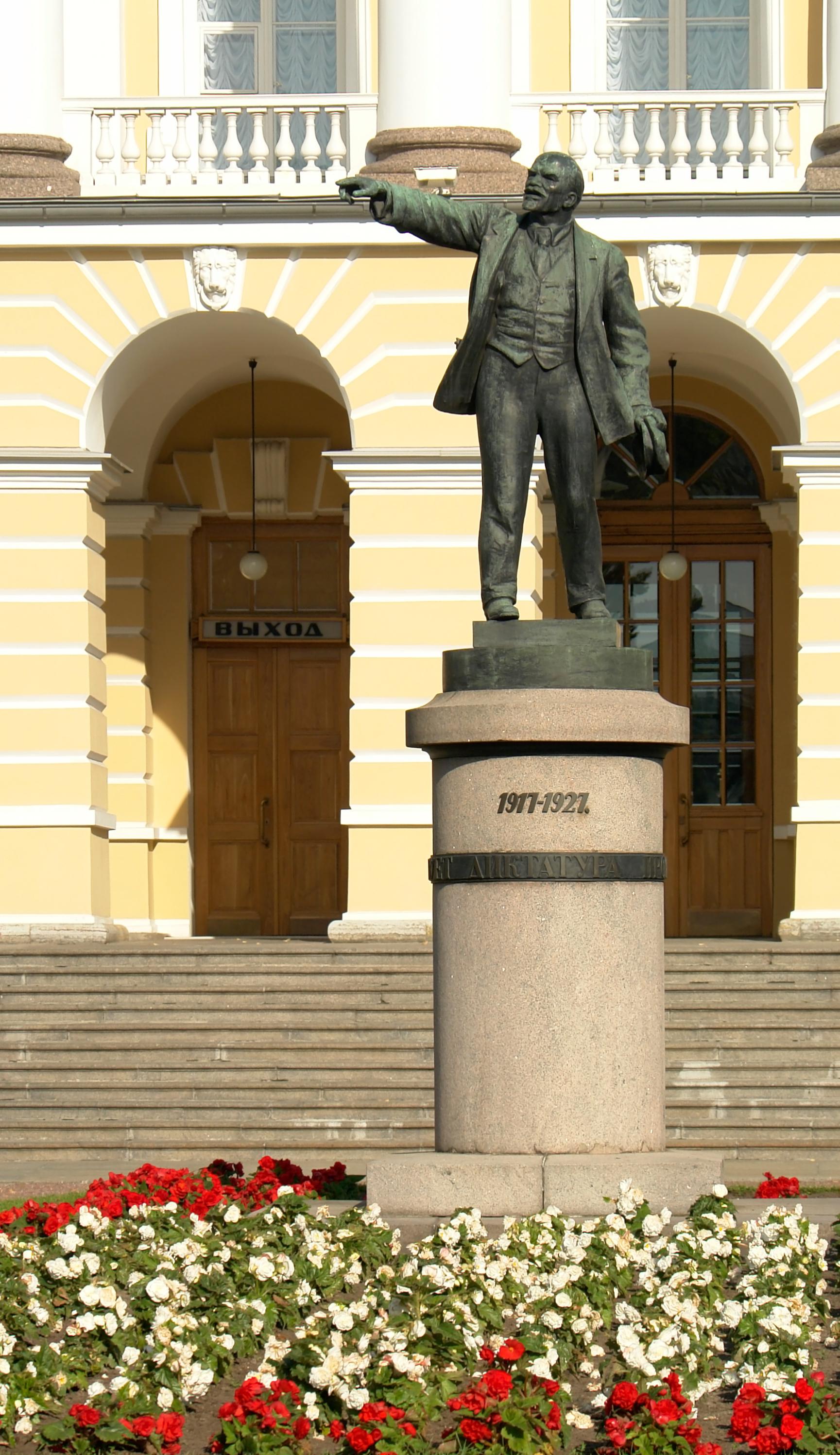
Lenin by Kozlov, Smolny Institute, Leningrad, 1927

Vasily Vasilyevich Kozlov (Russian: Василий Васильевич Козлов; 11 April 1887 – 5 June 1940) was a Soviet sculptor.

== Life ==
The son of a peasant, Kozlov was born and raised in Vladykino, a small village in the Saratov Governorate of the Russian Empire. In 1898 his family emigrated to Petersburg, where Vasily studied in Company's of encouragement of painters' school. After graduating from school, Kozlov was working in studios as master of stucco moulding for building's facades for six years. In 1906-1912 he was a student of the Imperial Academy of Arts. While in school he made friends with Leopold Dietrich, who became a frequent collaborator.

In 1919 Kozlov became a chairman of the Sculptors' committee and later a professor of sculptural faculty at the Academy of Art. He died in 1940, and was buried in the Volkovo Cemetery.

== Works ==
- Bas-reliefs and other architectural sculpture for the Wawelberg Bank building, Nevsky Prospekt, St. Petersburg, 1912
- Figures of Asclepius and Hygieia, with other decoration, at the spa facilities at Yessentuki, 1915, with similar work at Pyatigorsk
- Vladimir Lenin at the Smolny Institute, Leningrad, 1927, with another copy of the same statue at Station Square in Vladivostok, 1930
- Decorative fence in place of Mikhail Lermontov's duel
- The Monuments of Lenin, Joseph Stalin and others
- The Monuments of workers, pilots and others Soviet people

== Sources ==
- online biography (in Russian)
- on the Vladivostok Lenin statue
