= Ilya Mashkov =

Russian painter

Ilya Ivanovich Mashkov Илья Иванович Машков
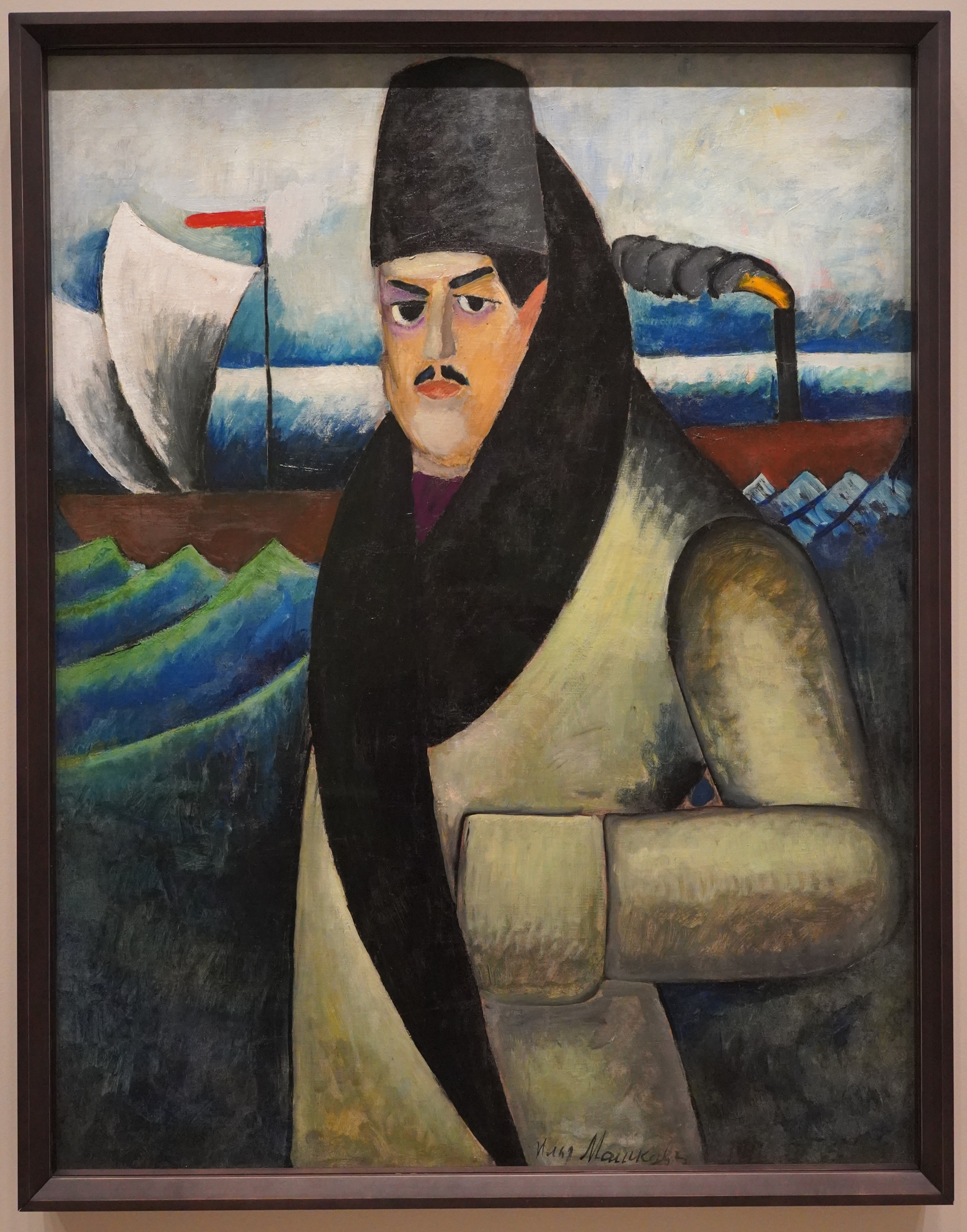
- Self-Portrait, 1911, oils; Tretyakov Gallery
- Born: 29 July [O.S. 17 July] 1881 cossack village Mikhailovskaya-on-Don (near Volgograd)
- Died: 20 March 1944 (aged 62); Moscow
- Known for: Painter
- Movement: Post-Impressionism, Fauvism

Ilya Ivanovich Mashkov (Russian: Илья Иванович Машков; 29 July [O.S. 17 July] 1881 – 20 March 1944) was a Russian artist, one of the most significant and at the same time most characteristic painters of the circle of "Jack of Diamonds" (Russian: Бубновый Валет).

== Biography ==
He was born in the cossack village Mikhailovskaya-on-Don (near Volgograd) 29 July [O.S. 17 July] 1881 in a peasant family. After arriving at Moscow in 1900 he attended the Moscow School of Painting, Sculpture and Architecture, whose teachers included Konstantin Korovin and Valentin Serov. In 1909 he was expelled from the school because of his artistic free thinking. He traveled much as a student, visiting a number of the countries of West Europe, and also Turkey and Egypt. He was the member of associations "Mir iskusstva" (Russian: Мир иску́сства) and "Jack of Diamonds". He lived in Moscow, sometimes visiting his village.

His creative work reflected the colour revolution of the 20th century. The artistic innovations of Paul Cézanne and Henri Matisse were evident in his paintings which contained the full-blooded energy of folk art. Turbulent colour expression, infected with vital energy, is combined with the laws of primary symmetry characteristic of urban folklore: signs, trays. The artist achieved particular expressiveness in still life, his favourite genre. He hyperboles the material world, condenses forms, dramatises colour contrasts and exaggerates texture, creating powerful pictorial formulas.

In addition to the Jack of Diamonds main genre of still life (Still Life. Fruit in a Dish, 1910; The Pumpkin 1914), Mashkov created theatrical, shocking portraits (Portrait of I.E.Kirkcaldy, 1910; Self-Portrait, 1911). In the 1920-1930s the artist tried to amalgamate his innovative achievements with the refinement of paintings by old masters (Food, Moscow Bread, 1924). Later the artist followed the principles of Socialist Realism. Remaining true to his great love for nature, he continued to produce masterpieces (Still Life. Pineapples and Bananas, 1938).

Ilya Mashkov started to exhibit at the Salon d'Automne Exposition de l'art russe since 1906, at the Salon des Indépendants since 1911.

In 1913 he participated at the Exposition Internationale du Cercle de l’art Moderne a Amsterdam in the Stedelijk Museum Amsterdam. In 1924 Mashkov's works exhibited at the United States and Venice.

He died in Moscow on 20 March 1944.

In June 2013 during Russian Art Week in London, Christie's sold Mashkov's Still life with fruit for a record $7.3 million. The painting, in its debut in the art market, was originally valued at an estimated $1.5-2.3 million. Still life with fruit has been described as “the finest example of Russian Neo-Primitivism.”

Painted in 1910, it was immediately revealed to the public at the inaugural Jack of Diamonds exhibition in Moscow, one of the earliest exhibitions of Russian Avant-Garde.

== Some works ==
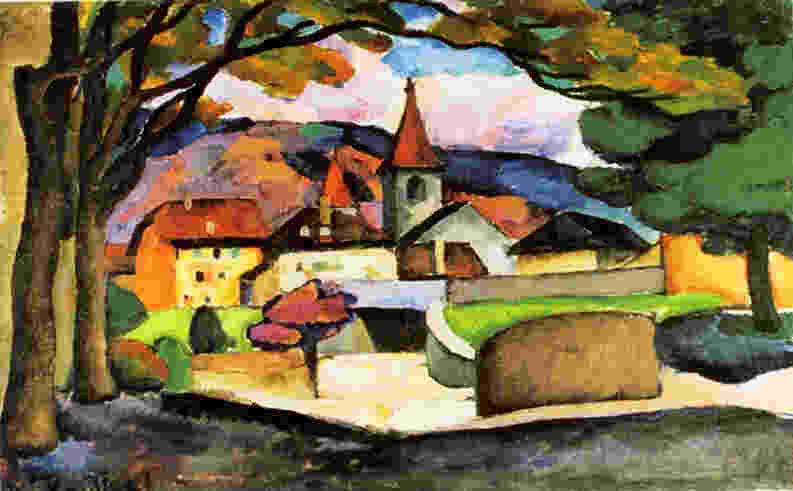
Landscape with a Town, 1910

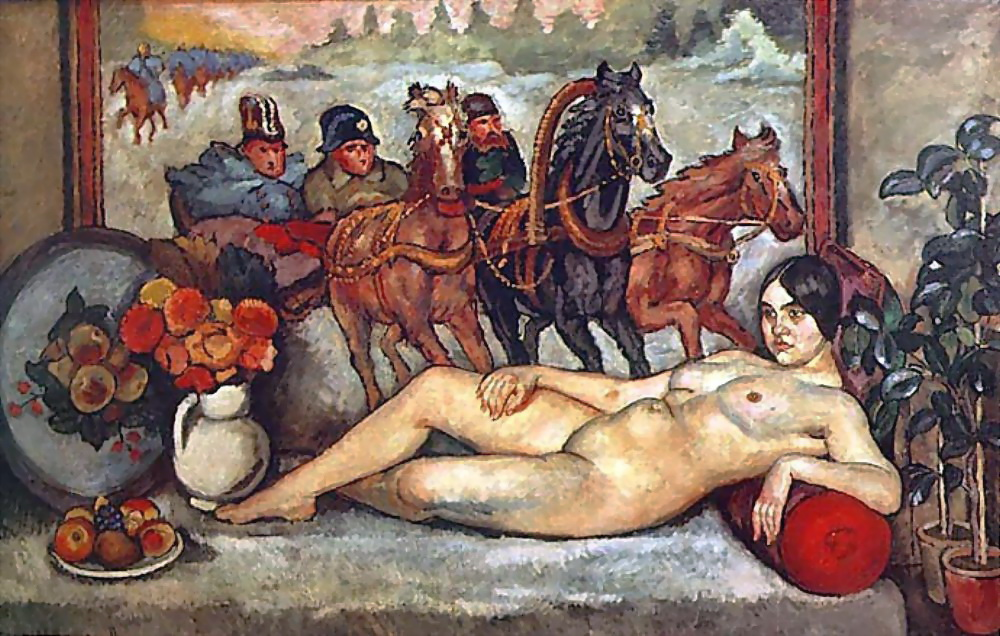
Russian Venus, 1914

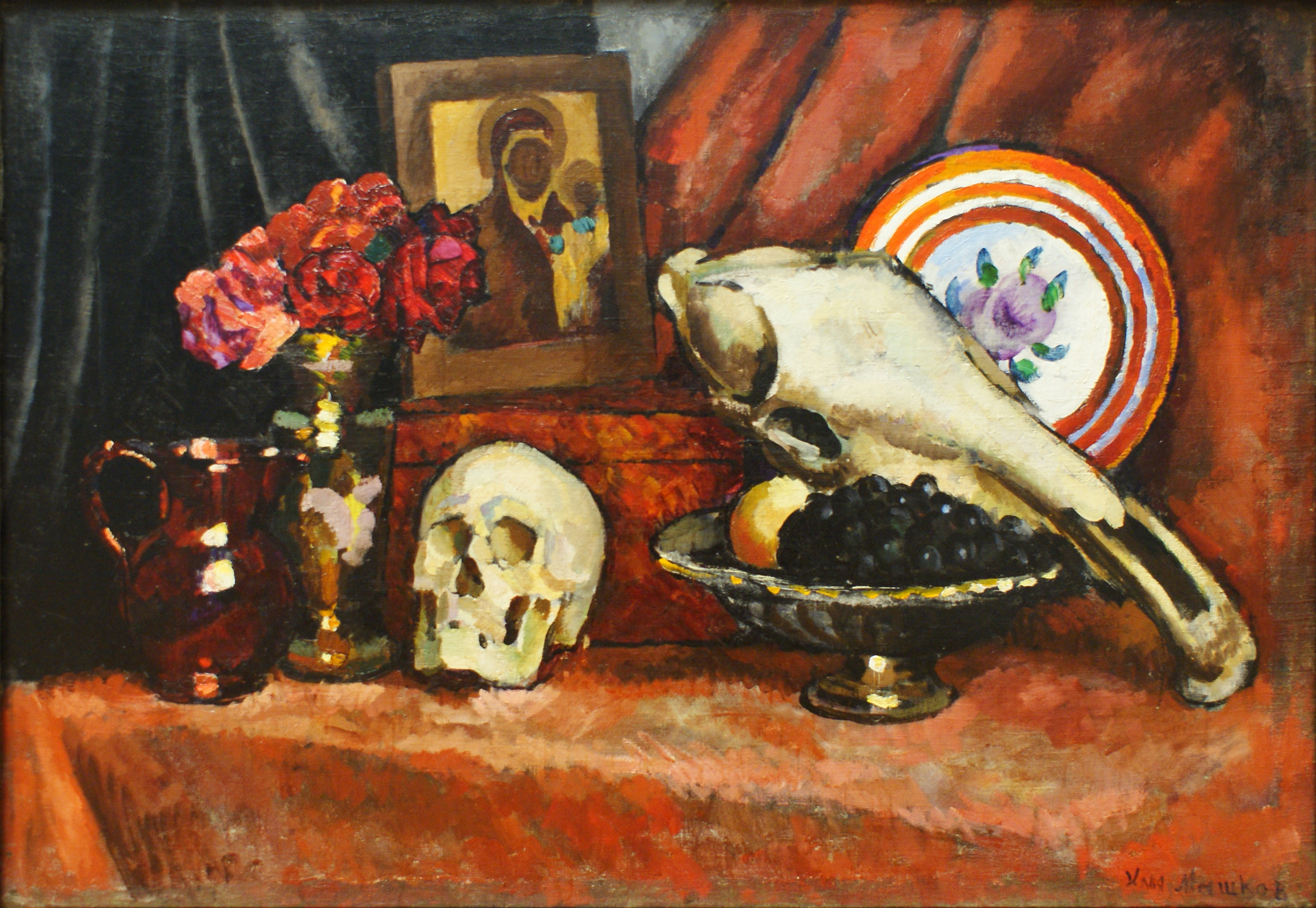
Still life with skulls, 1910

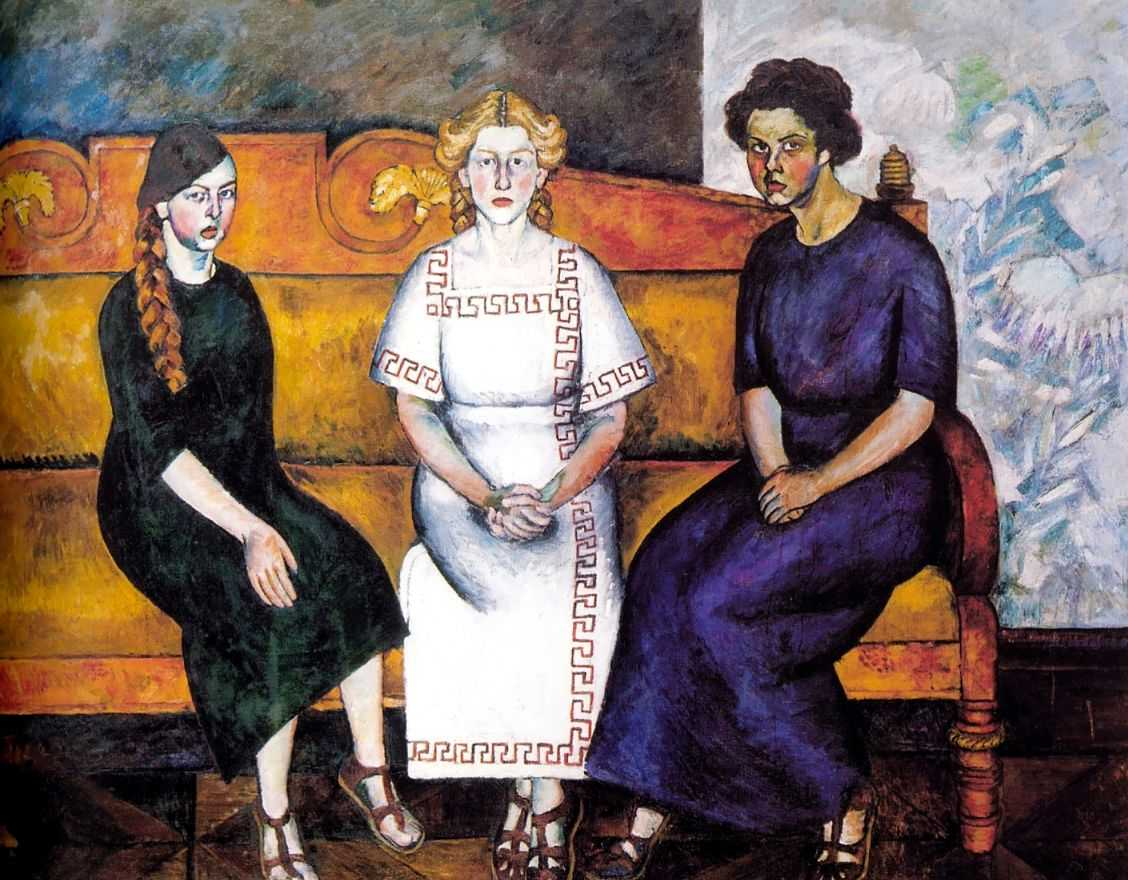
Three sisters, 1911

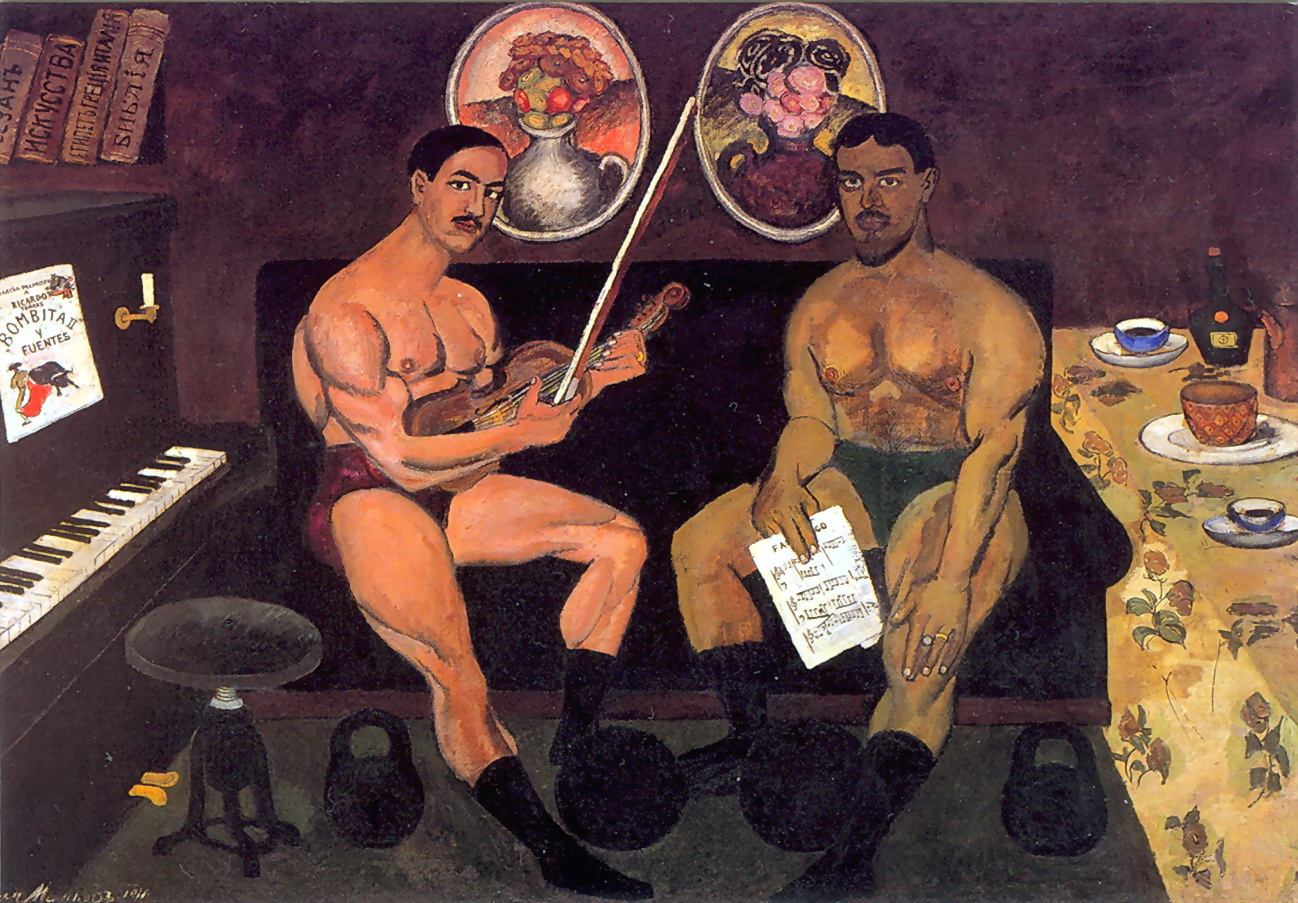
Self-portrait and a Portrait of Pyotr Konchalovsky, 1910
