= The Dot (Toyism) =

Art in Emmen, Netherlands

The DOT
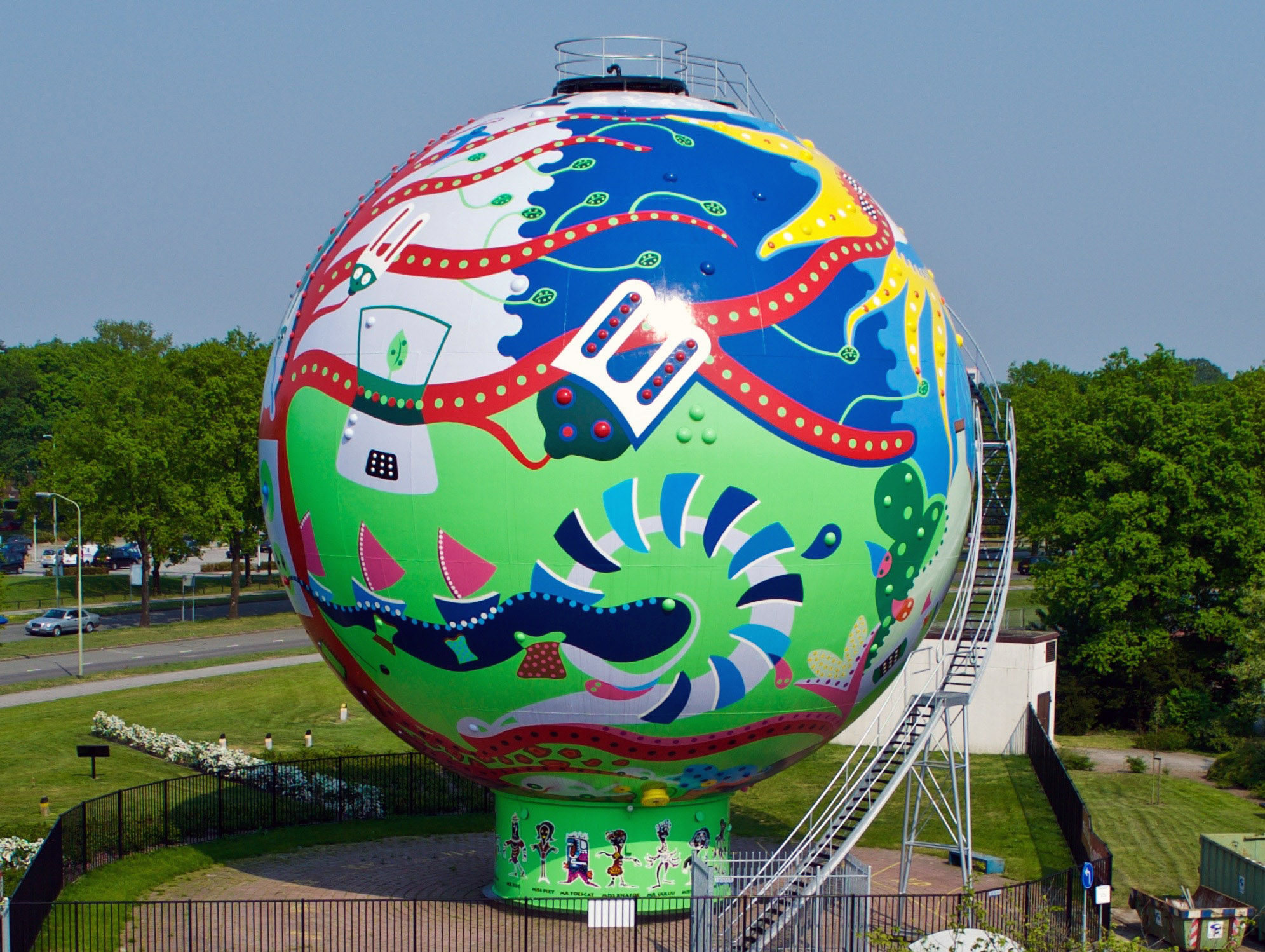
- Artist: Toyists
- Year: 2010
- Subject: Live with Energy
- Dimensions: 2200 cm (870 in)
- Location: Emmen; 52.46373°N 6.54433°E
- Website: destip.info

The Dot is a work of art in Emmen (Netherlands). It is designed and painted by art collective the toyists. The Dot is a former gas container of which only two still exist in Europe. The toyists painted this monumental industrial object and linked it with the theme of Live with energy.

== History ==
Toyist Dejo (founder of Toyism) came up with the idea of painting the gas globe in Emmen in 1997. After the first meetings in 2005 with the owner of the gas container, energy company Essent (later called Enexis), it would still take until 2008 before the project could finally be put in motion. This was partly due to the establishment of the foundation Living Industry, which deals with the reuse of industrial properties and the redevelopment of industrial sites. After the municipality of Emmen agreed with the project, a scaffolding of eight stories was built around the 22 meter high gas container. On 27 July the artist started the project of painting The Dot.

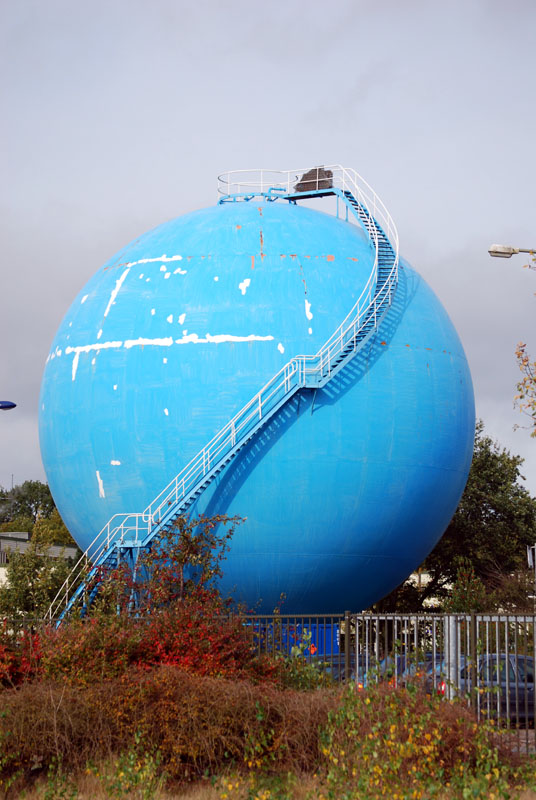
Former gas container

== Transformation ==
The transformation of the former (blue) gas container took several months to complete, from mid-July 2009 until the unveiling on June 4, 2010, with a winter break of two months. The project had 17 toyists from 7 different countries working for 6000 hours, they painted an area of 1250 m2 in multiple layers.

== Theme ==
The theme of this art work is live with energy. Figurative imagery in the painting tells the story of the history of energy production. There are four sub designs based on the four elements of life: earth (raw energy), water (hydroelectric power), fire (solar energy) and air (wind power). Each sub-design presents the combination or contrast of old and new forms of energy production and their applications (the sciences). In addition to these four fundamental themes, there is a single, central figure: the tree. The tree is a metaphor for life, energy, growth, development, and change. The province of Drenthe with its rich history of peat production is also represented in the painting. In addition, in the form of standalone motifs, general applications or containers of energy such as ecobunny lights and battery-insects can be seen moving throughout the whole painting.

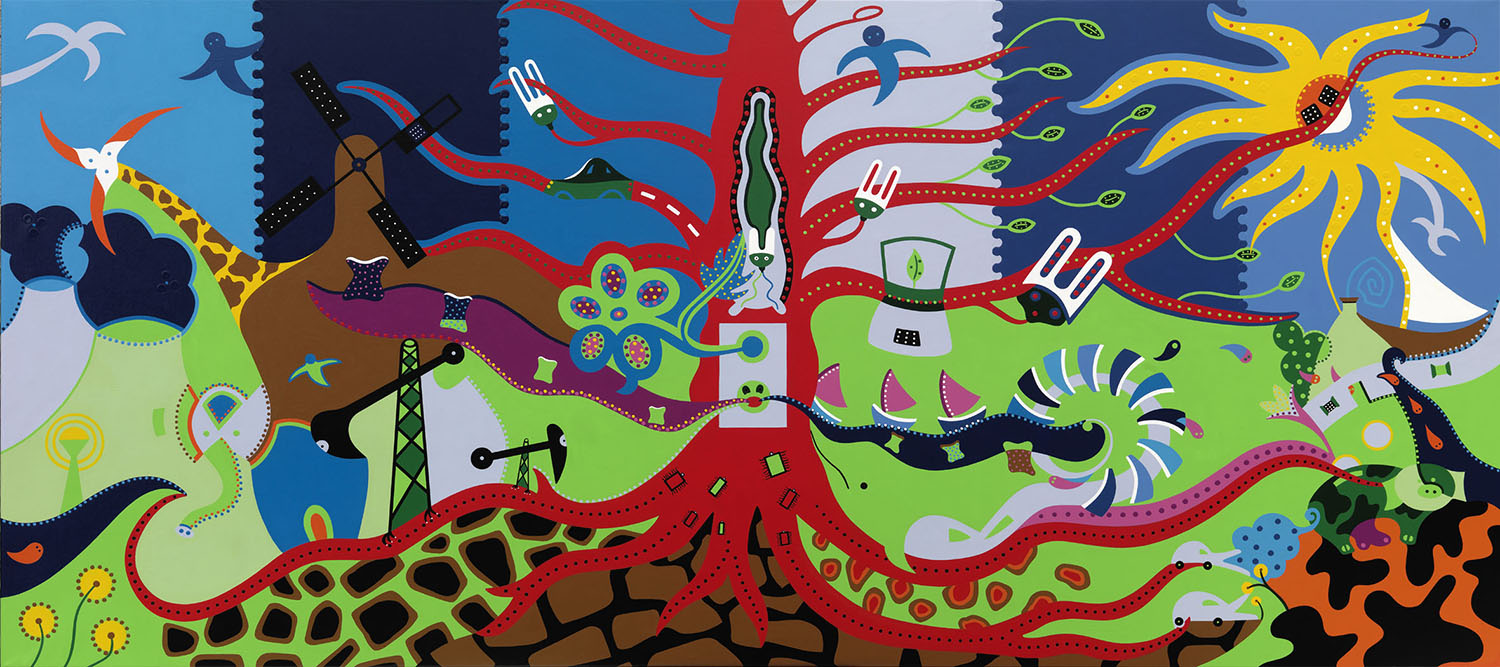
Design of The Dot

== Restoration ==
In the summer of 2015 The Dot was repainted. Over the years the paint had peeled off and The Dot needed to be restored to its former state. The toyists set up a crowdfunding project and, when enough money was collected, started the restoration.

In 2013 the toyists did a similar project in Keflavik, Iceland called Uppspretta.

Toyists working

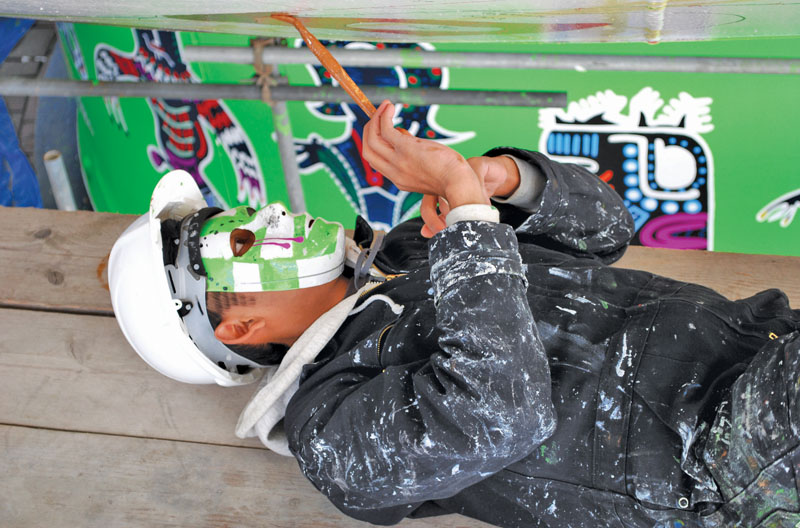

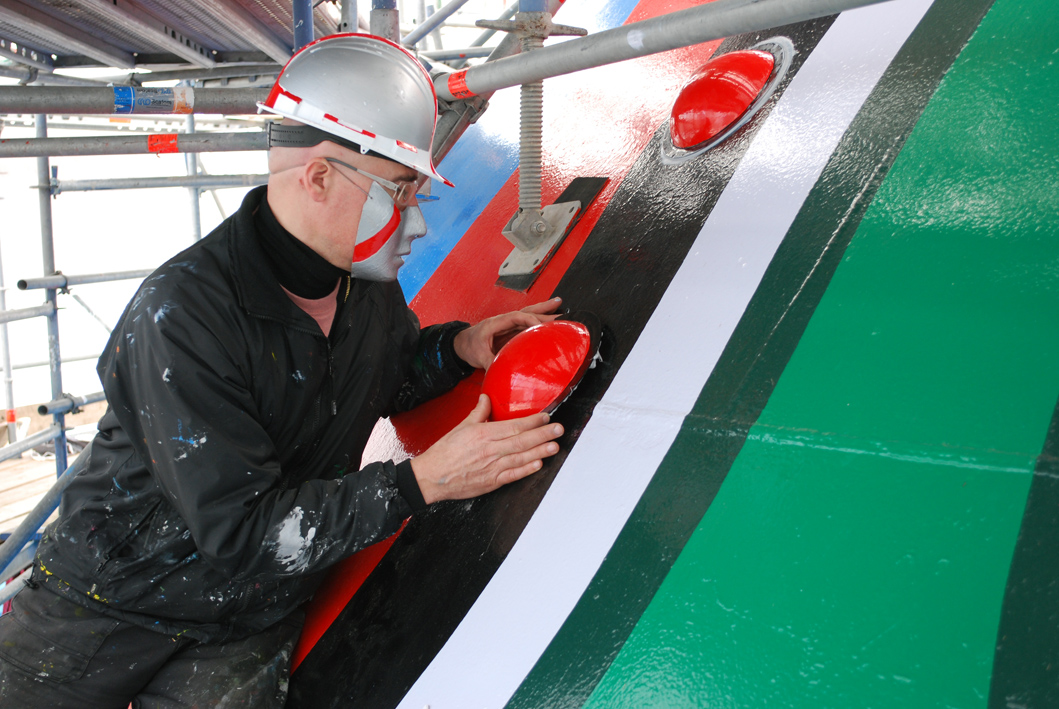

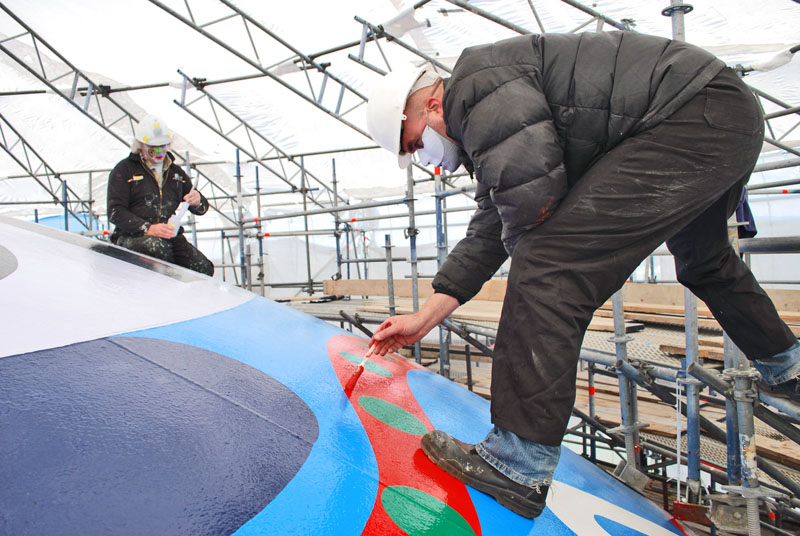

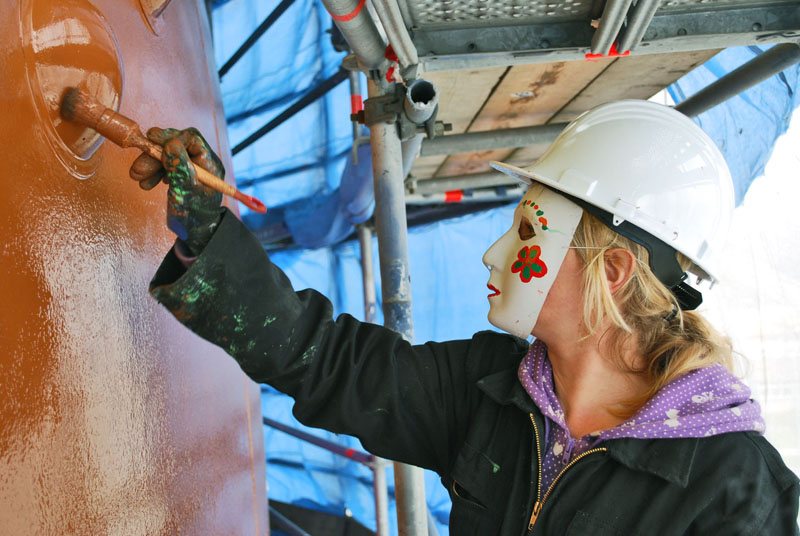

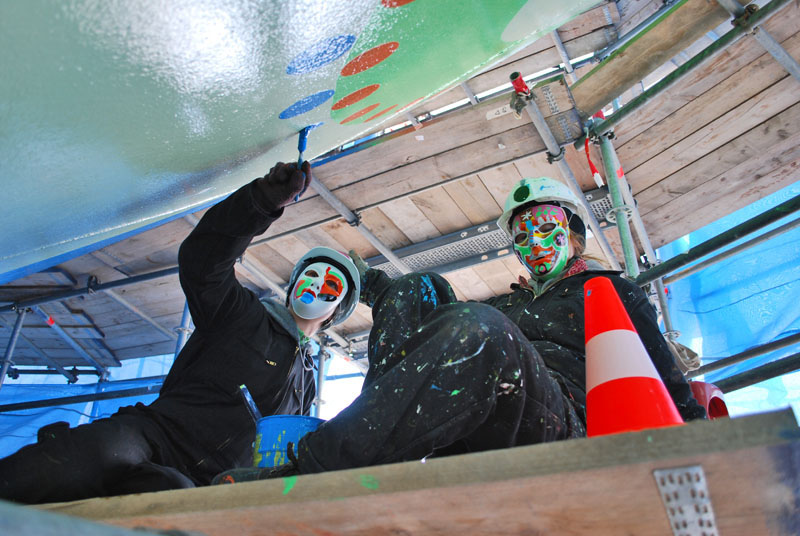
The reveal

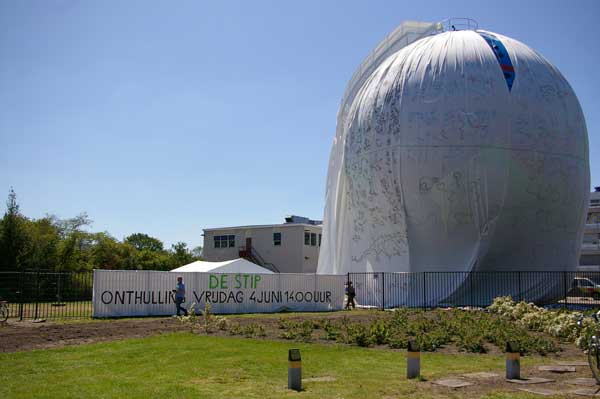
Unveiling of The Dot

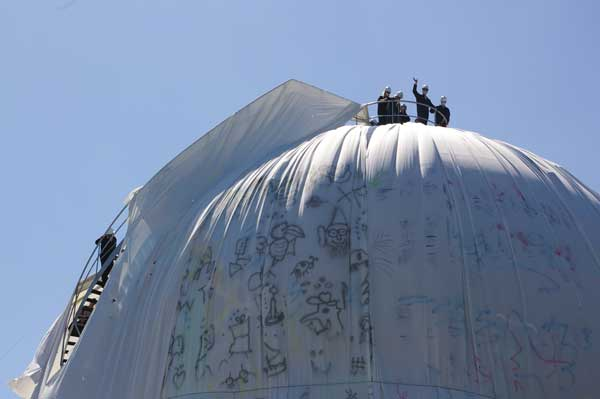
Toyists on top

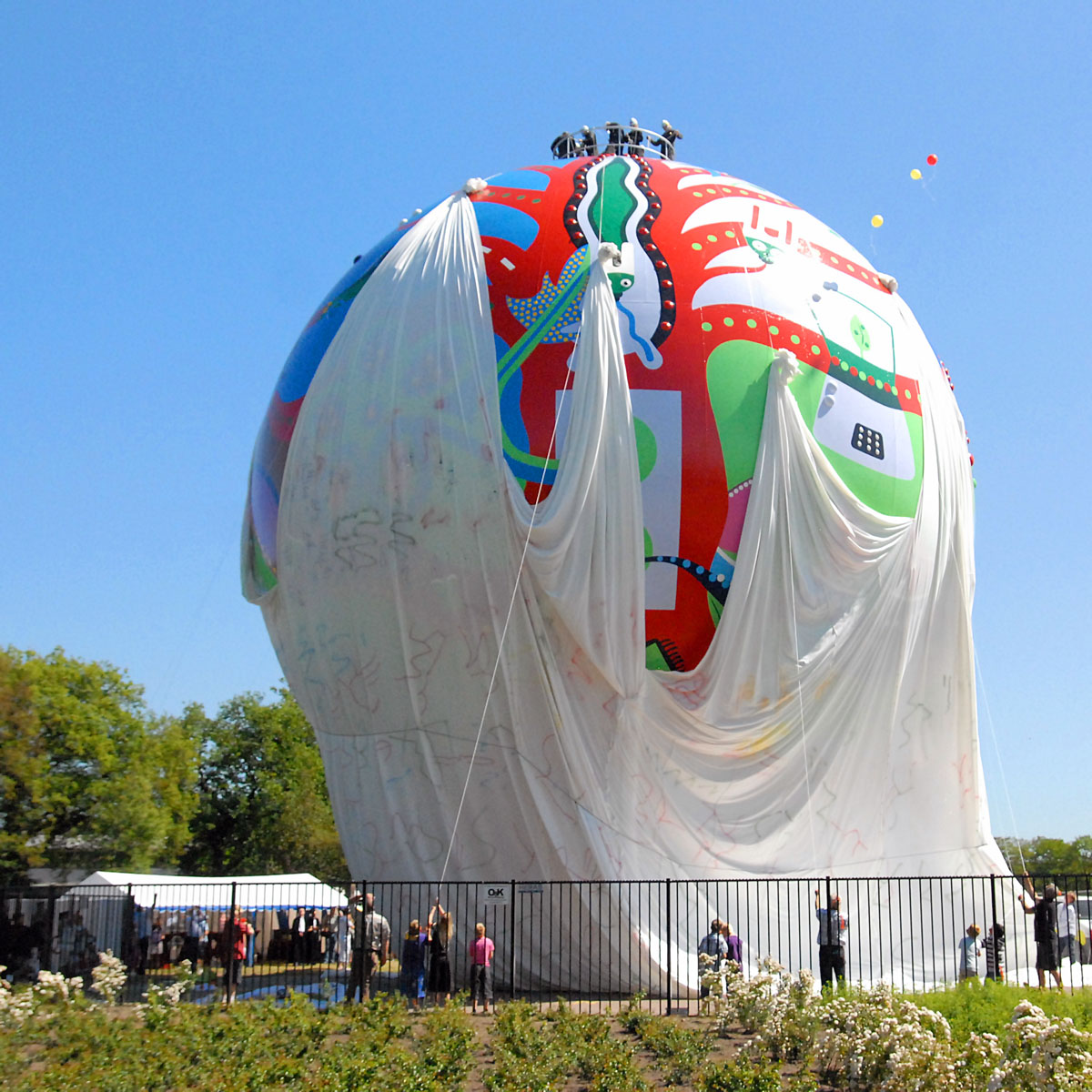
The canvas goes down

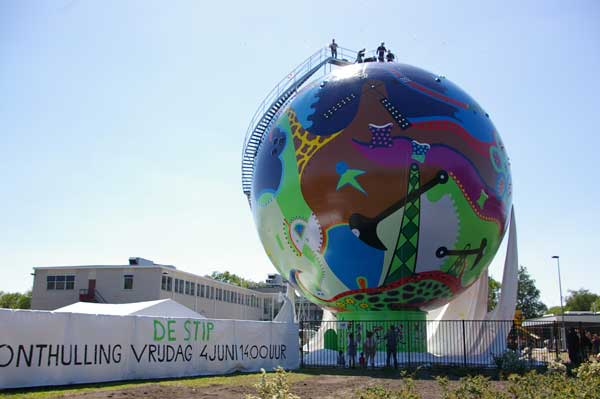
The Dot is revealed

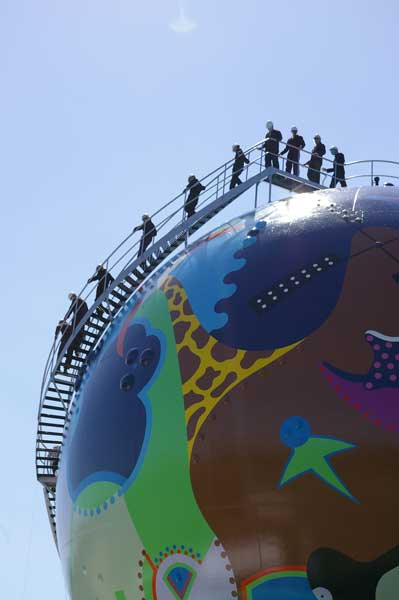
Toyists coming down
