= Toyism =

Art movement

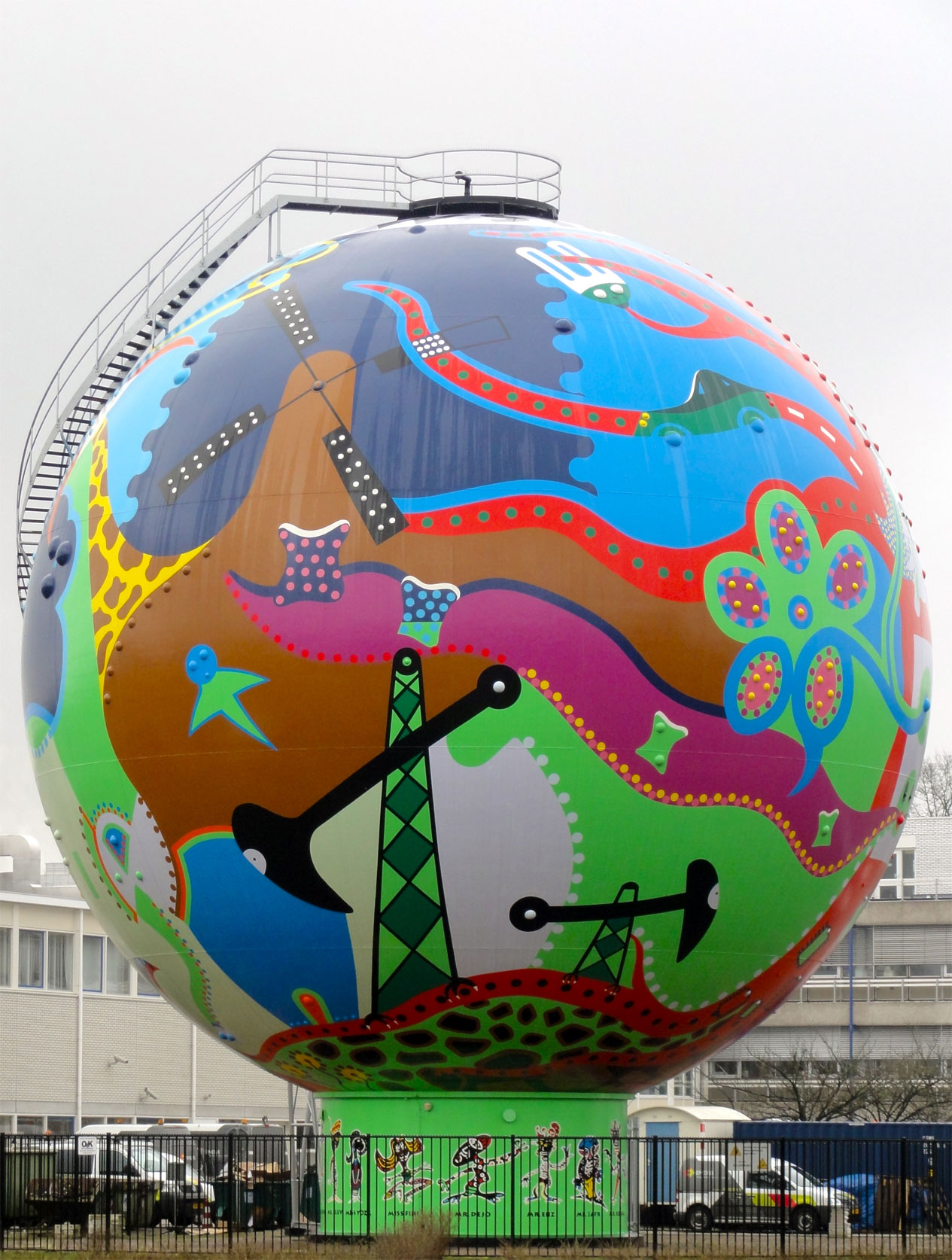
De Stip - Live with energy situated at Dordsestraat in Emmen

Toyism is a contemporary art movement that originated in the 1990s in Emmen, Netherlands. The word symbolises the playful character of the artworks and the philosophy behind it. The suffix ism refers to motion or movements that exist in both the world of art and religion. The collective artistic style is extensively considered to disseminate a relevant perspective in the present time.

== Origin ==
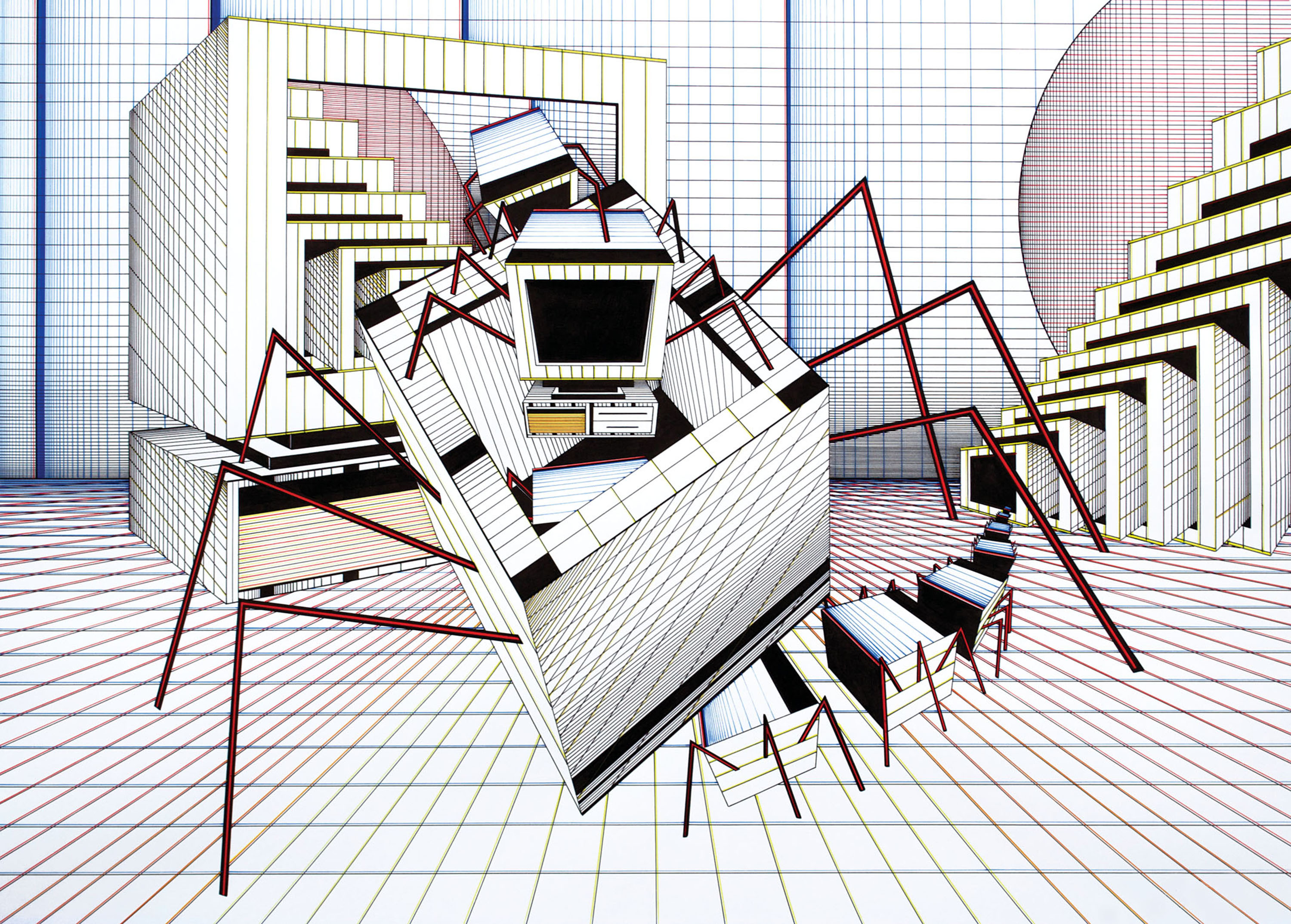
Escape of computer spiders, by Dejo, 1990

Toyism is an art movement characterized by a reaction on the post-modern world of individualism, which existed in the 1970s through the 1990s, the era in which “everything is allowed”. The name originated in 1990 when artist Dejo made a graphic work which was titled "Escape of computer spiders". It was this work and later similar works that were the origin of the style at the beginning of the nineties. However, it took another two years before this resulted in a manifest. On 5 September 1992, the artist and musician Dejo (pseudonym) from Emmen wrote a manifesto called Mother and introduced Toyism to the audience.

== History ==
Toyism can be split in two different periods, the period from 1992 to 2000 and 2002 to the present.

=== 1992-2000 ===
In late 1992, two other artists from Emmen joined the movement. In the first period, mostly the themes were worked out in a surrealistic manner and the returning presence of fixed icons, such as computers, space shuttles and teddy-bears, in their paintings. These icons represented the attending artists. The first exhibition was on February 24, 1993, in Het Veenpark. One year after the foundation work was exhibited in New York City. At the base was a figurative style with uniform areas of colour and simplistic elements that were inspired by Super Mario and the game console Nintendo. After the triumvirate fell apart, founder Dejo decided to make a world-trip and got inspired to make Toyism more international and open.

=== 2002 ===
After his world-trip Dejo rewrote the manifesto and gave other artists access to join the movement. As from 2002 the group of artists grows exponentially and artists from every corner of the earth decide to participate (Thailand, South Africa, Malaysia, United States, Iceland, Mexico, Peru, Italy, Australia, Canada, Belgium, the Netherlands, Romania, Germany, China).

=== Present ===
Present day the toyists have created 800 works of art, varying from paintings to sculptures and buildings. The toyists had a permanent studio/gallery in Emmen until 2015. In the same year they relocated their headquarters to the city of Groningen. They had a gallery in Villa Heymans next to the Groninger Museum for two years. As of 2017 they are located next to the KLM Flight Academy and Groningen Airport Eelde.

== Philosophy ==
The philosophy of Toyism is that the artists operate as a collective, instead of separate individuals, hence one Toyist cannot be seen as more important or famous than the other. There is no rivalry among the artists. The evident message they carry out is that the artworks count, not the artist itself that has created it. Although the artists do make their own art, in many occasions the Toyists work together, which means that the produced artwork cannot be attributed to a single artist.

== Manifesto ==
The secret manifesto Mother contains a palette of ingredients from which mainly paintings, but lately also sculptures, silkscreens, jewelry and glass art emerge. The manifesto is only meant to be read by the attending artists. The artworks can be seen as children of Mother and one or more parents (the artists). A parent can be either a man or a woman, or even more artists representing one parent next to Mother. This can be established because of the anonymous characteristics of the parents, they operate by using a pseudonym hiding their real identity for the audience. Every parent mixes ideas and characteristics with properties of Mother. This strongly connects the children, after all they arose from Mother.

== Pseudonym ==
Every toyist that joins the group chooses a pseudonym (pen name) starting with one of the available letters from the alphabet, a letter not yet in use by another toyist. This means that the group cannot be represented by more than 26 artists. Every single toyist chooses a so-called puppet, an icon representing the artist. By means of this puppet the toyist has its own face towards the public, although he or she is in fact faceless. Toyists never expose their human face (on photo or camera), instead, they wear masks to cover their identity.

All the toyists, under their pseudonyms, that have been/or still are part of the movement:

- Alfago
- Amukek
- Aniyina
- Bogha
- Bliissem
- Clamaoing
- Cluv
- Dejo
- Eiiz
- Fihi
- Gihili
- Hribso
- Iffio
- Iqoy
- Jaf’r
- Kixoz
- Knafoe
- Link
- Lodieteb
- Miku
- Mwano
- Nooiya
- Ollafinah
- Pixy
- Qooimee
- Roq
- Sassy
- Srylyn
- Toescat
- UULUU
- Vixyv
- Wennigeb
- Wolemeo
- Wywy
- Xippez
- Yoza
- Yicazoo
- Zigowst
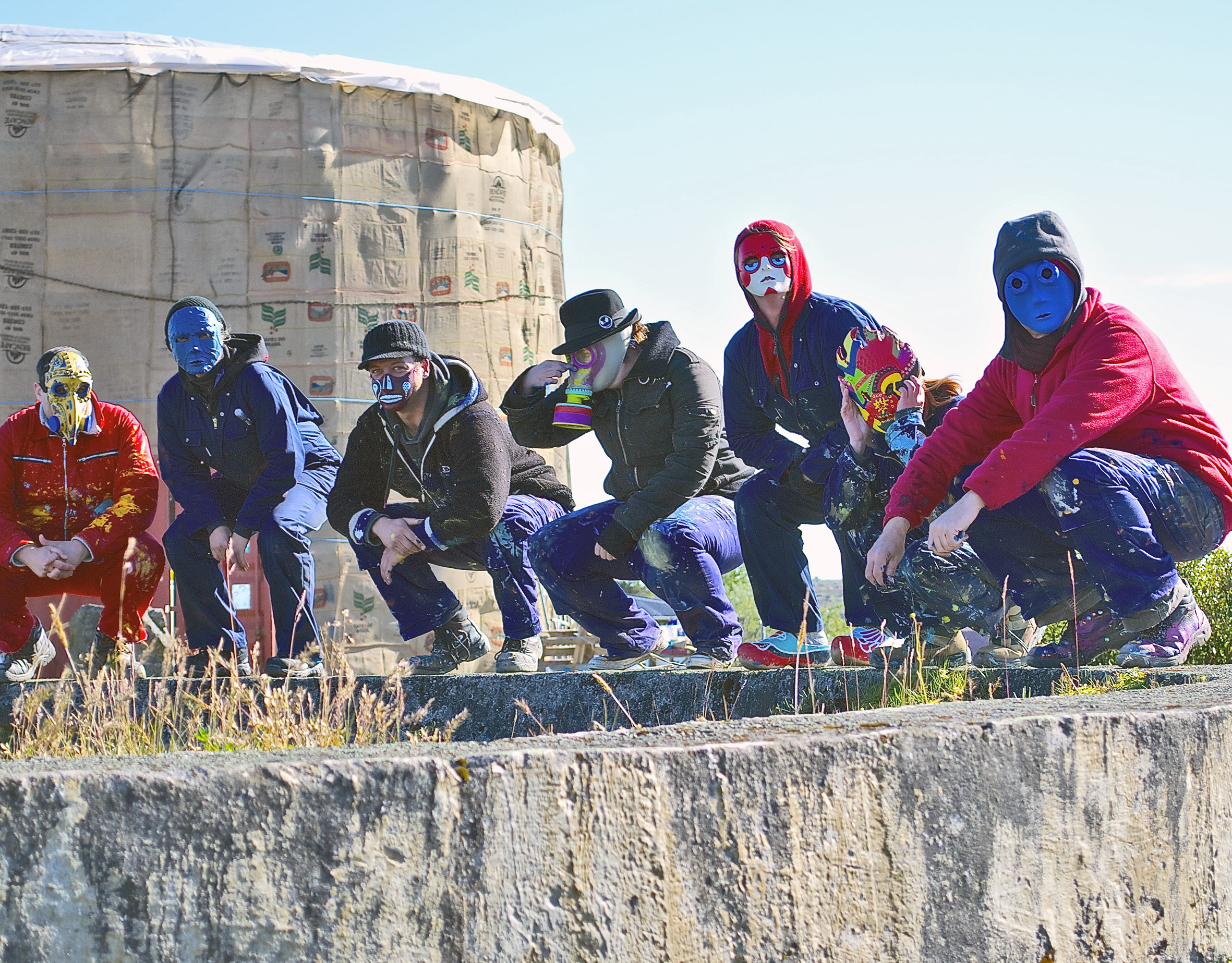
Toyists at Uppspretta

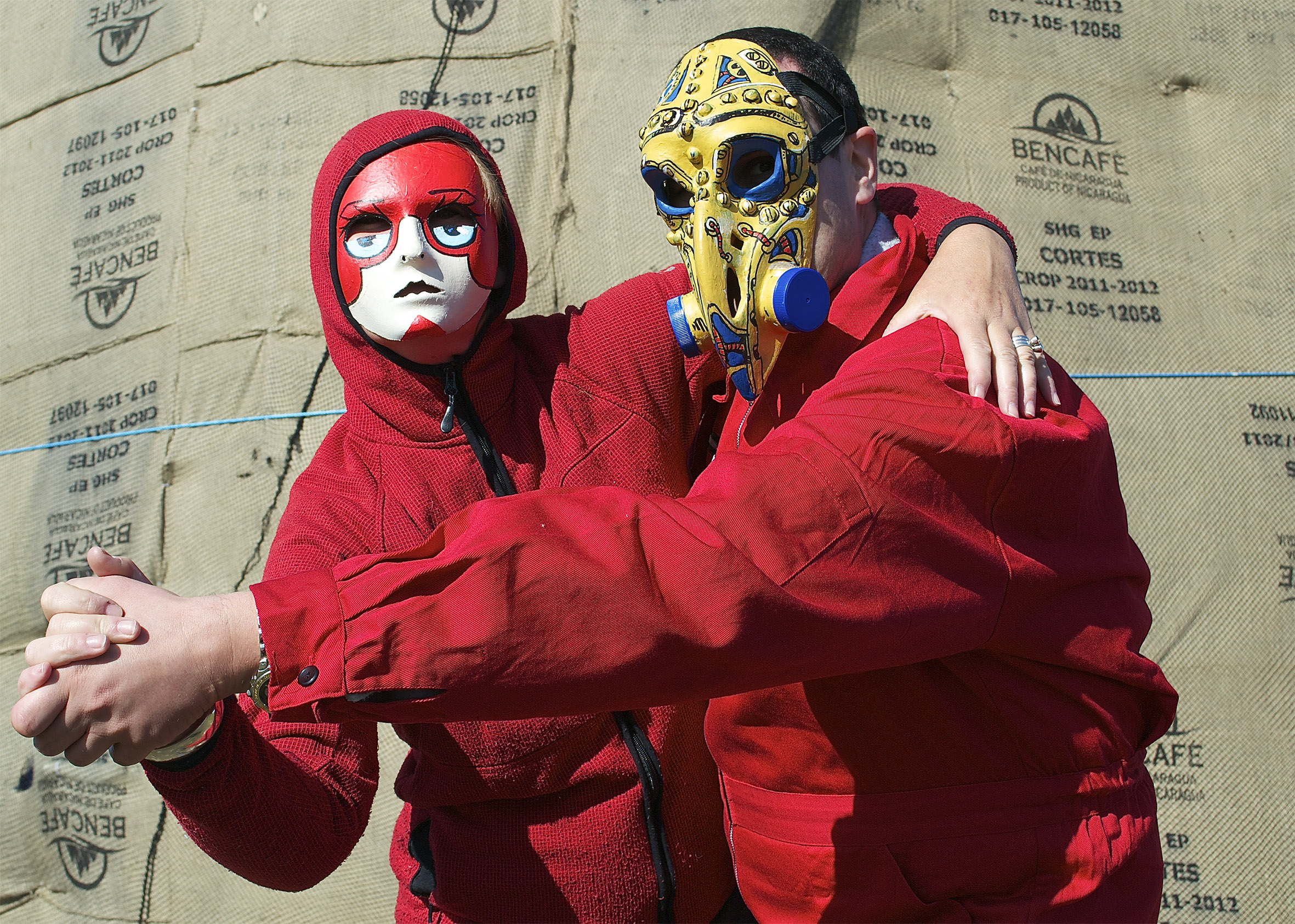
Toyists Blissem and Hribso

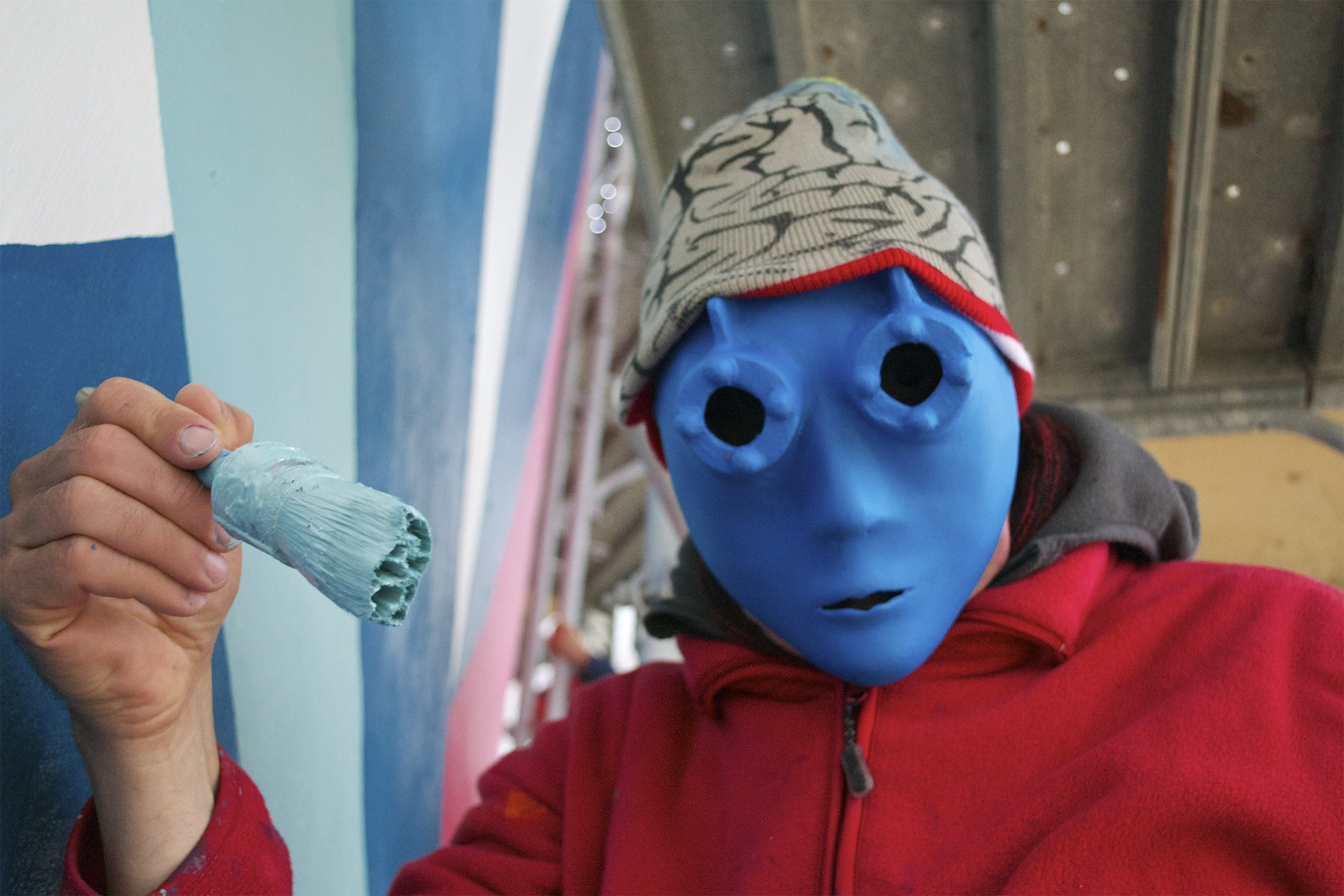
Toyist Dejo

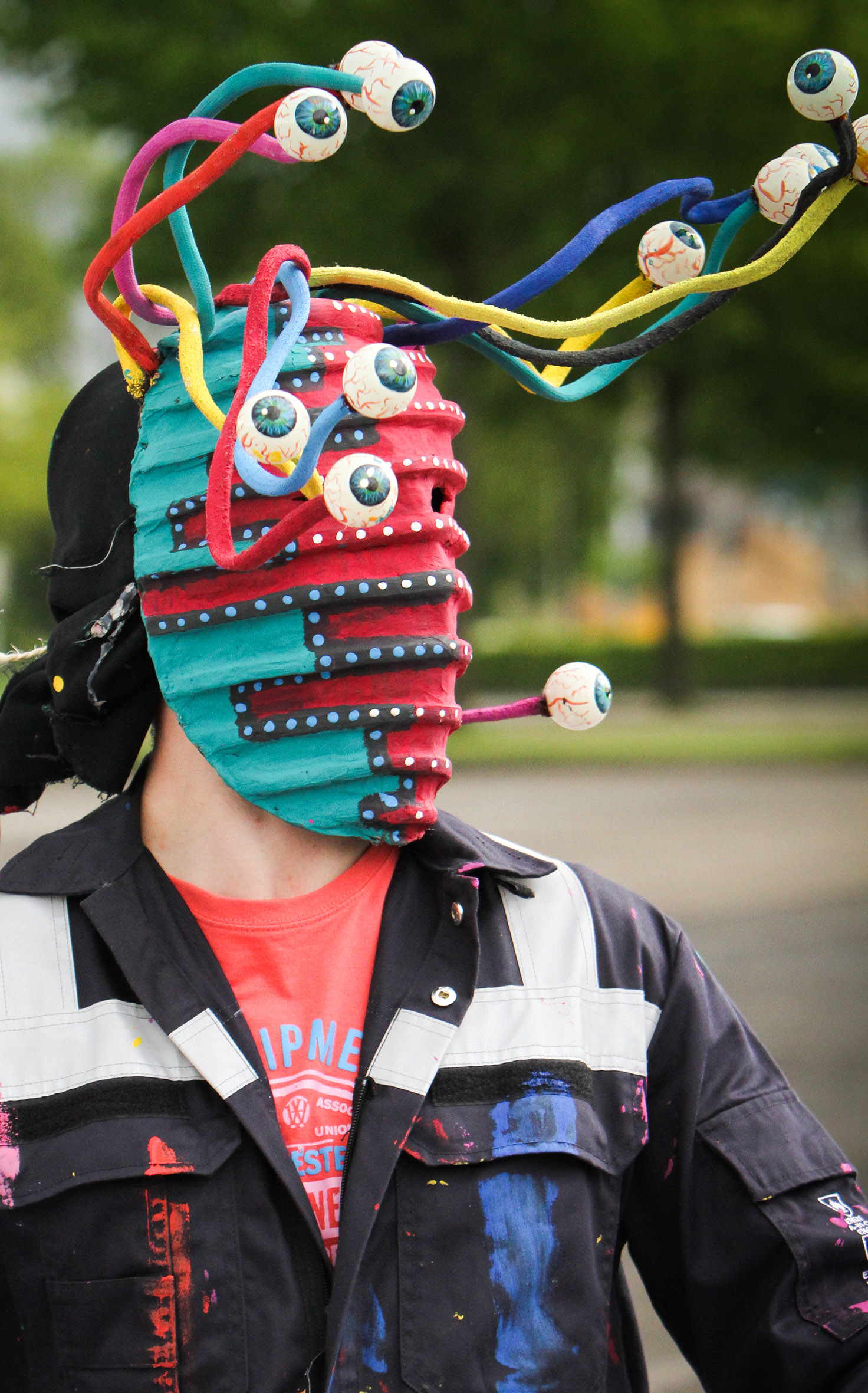
Toyist Gihili

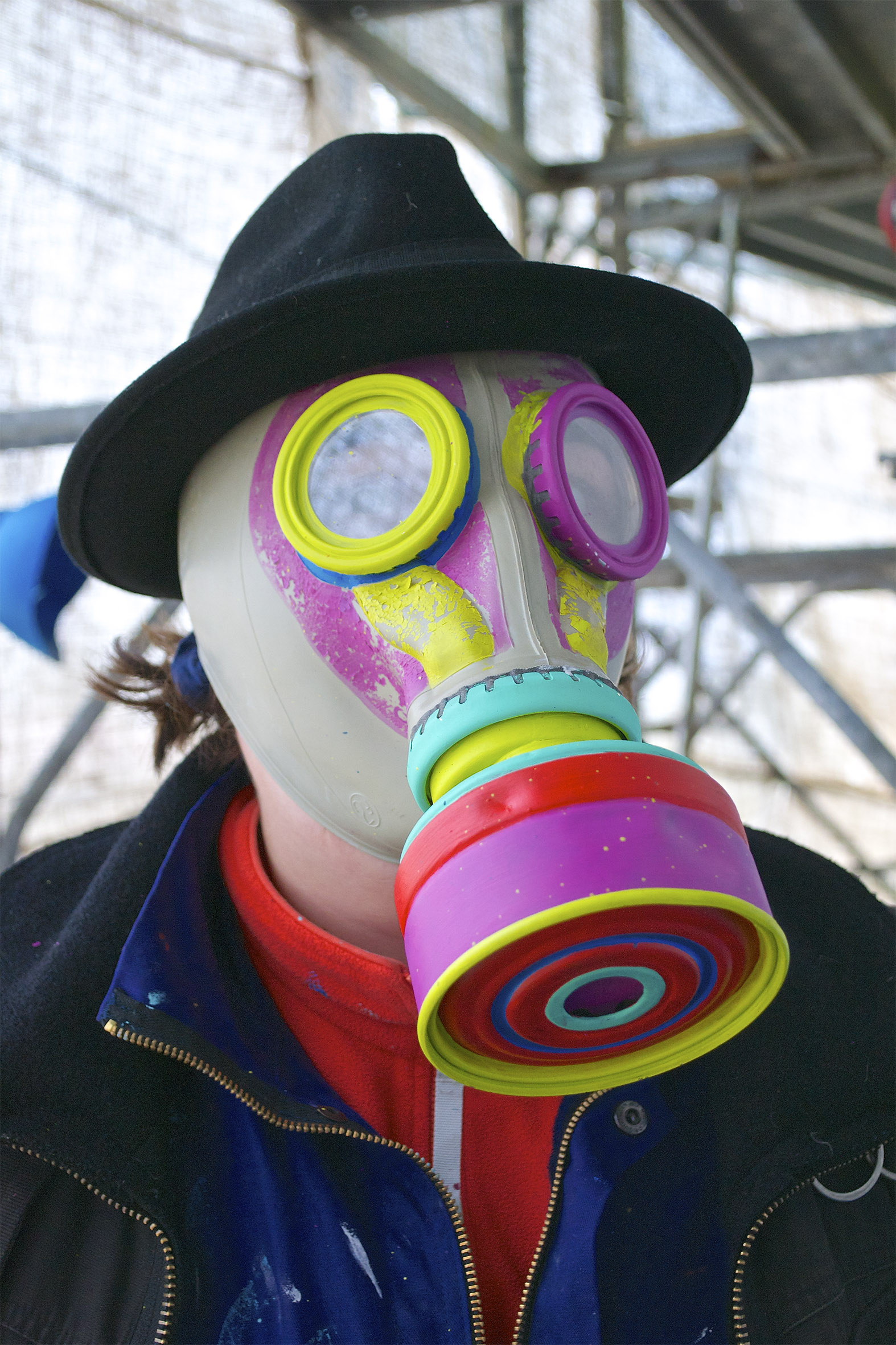
Toyist Qooimee

== Characteristics ==
- Figurative
- Storytelling
- Colours do not mix, they stand out against each other
- Dots
- Excellent craftsmanship
- Contemporary subjects
- Joyful at first sight, but often with a serious undertone

== Projects ==
=== Mind Games ===
In 2004 this game concept is devised. Two artists battle against each other and by doing so together they create a composition. Based on existing games like Tic-tac-toe, Chess and Four-in-a-row two main themes (and when applicable sub-themes) are worked out by the participating artists. Mostly the complete artwork consists of separate pieces of art that can be joined differently, visualising different game situations.

=== The Dot Project (De Stip) ===
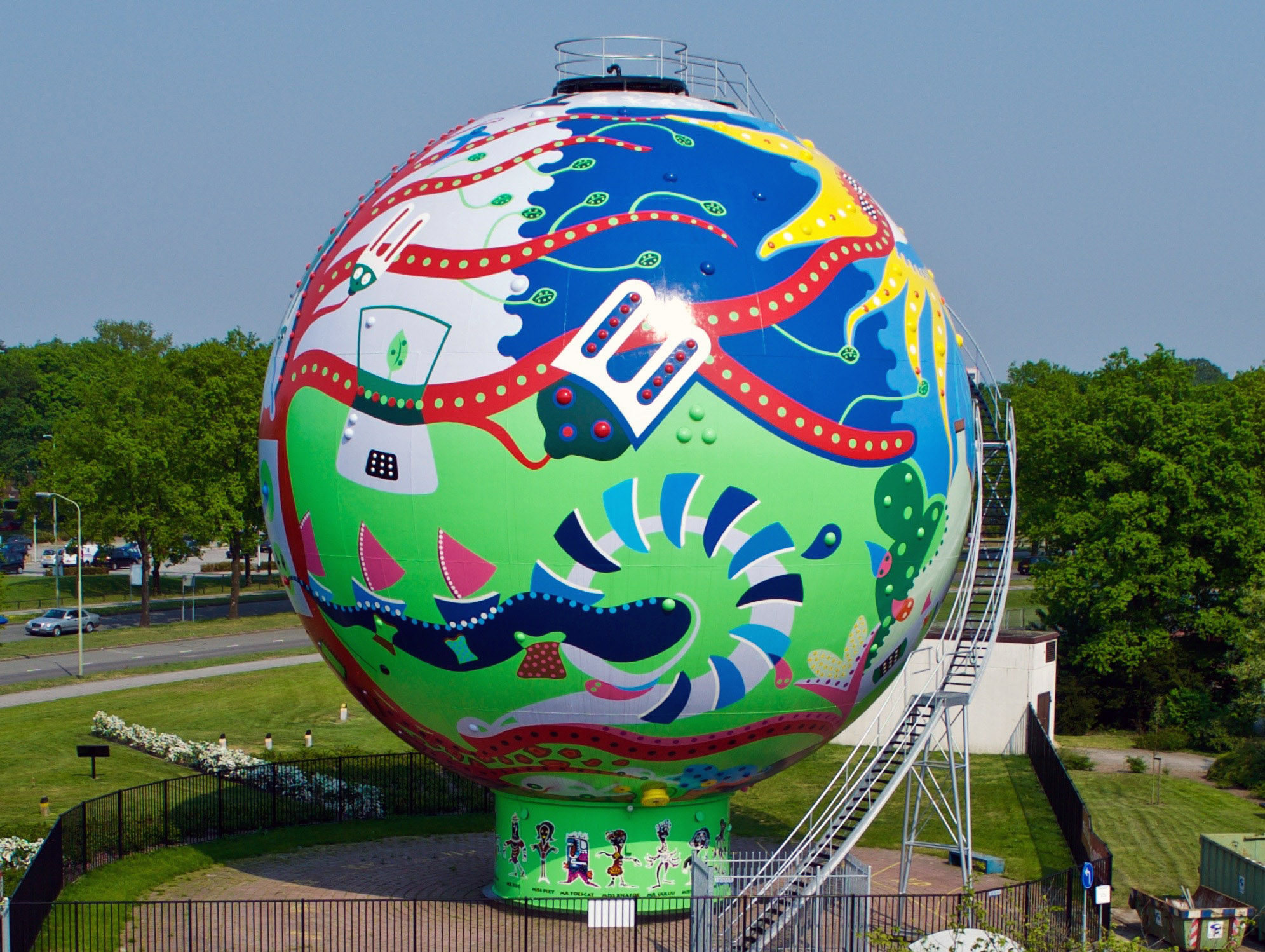
The Dot, Emmen, NL

On July 14, 2009, the group is ventured upon an extensive project: painting a spherical gas storage container, being 22 meters in height and 1250 square meters in surface, situated in Emmen, Netherlands. The toyists transformed this object within 9 months (6000 hours) into a colourful artwork called The Dot tells the story about Live with Energy.

=== Toyism Ka ===
A Ford Ka has been transformed to a driving artwork which has been moving around the town of Emmen and eventually was bought by a private person during a public sale.

=== Elephant Parade 2010 ===
In 2010 the Elephant Parade was held in Emmen, the same year in which Dierenpark Emmen was celebrating its 75th anniversary. For this occasion the toyists designed "E-Phant" (Energy-Phant). Being an extension of the "Living with Energy" project, E-Phant is equipped with solar collectors in its ears, with which batteries are charged during daytime and twenty surrounding LED lights per ear shine when it gets dark.

=== Hotel Ten Cate ===
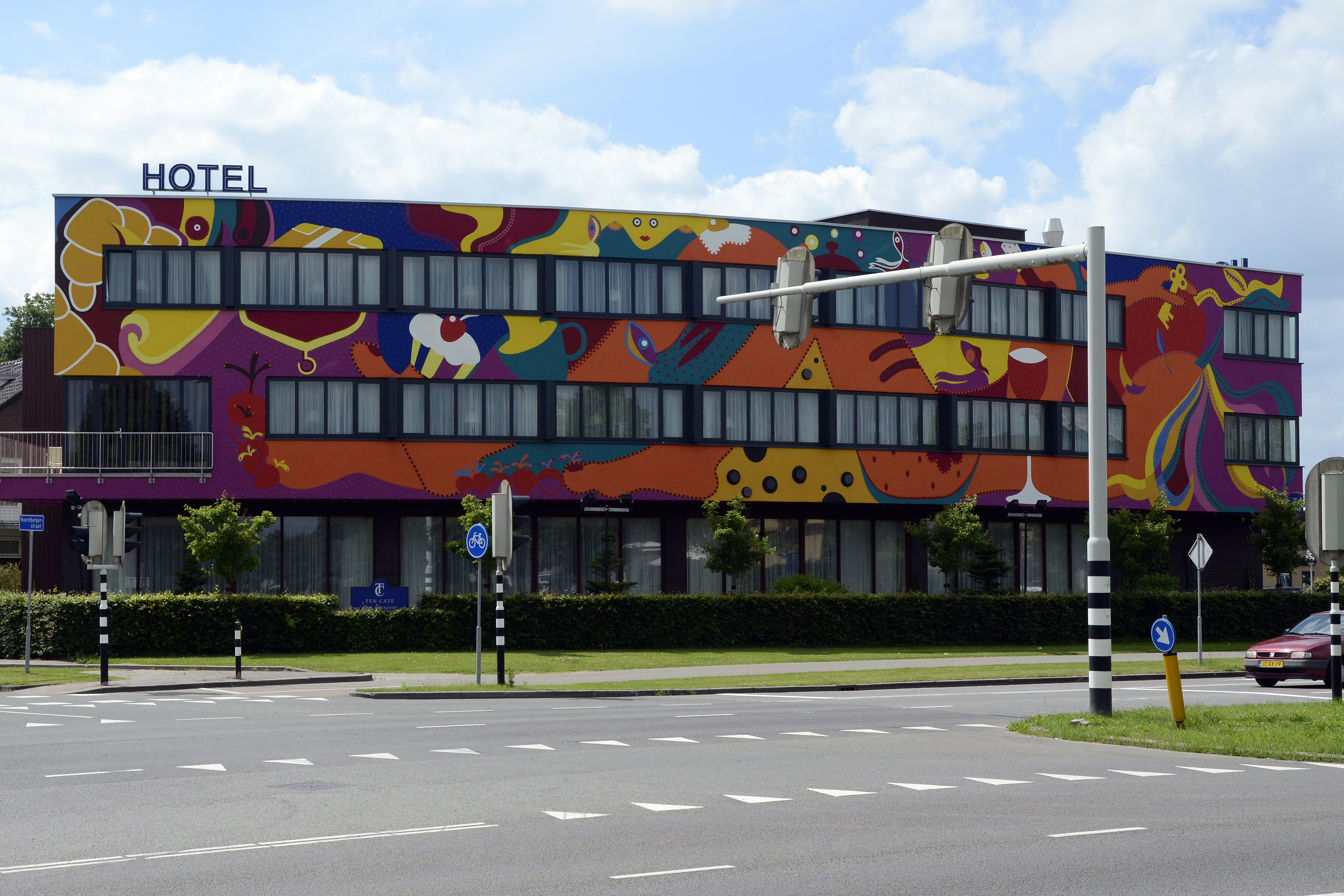
Hotel ten Cate, Emmen, NL

In 2012 the toyists started to completely transform Hotel Ten Cate in Emmen to a huge piece of art. On May 16, 2012, the official reveal took place. The facade was changed into a gigantic painting called 'Dreams for Breakfast'. Inside the hotel one room was changed into a piece of art in which people can go to sleep. In October of the same year another six hotel rooms were delivered and there are more to follow in the coming years. The rooms are not only subject to painting, but their floor-covering and curtains are also revised accordingly. Every room has its own theme, for example 'Savanne – The Dreaming Lion', 'Cinema – Charley Playing the Piano', 'Bal Masqué – Hide and Seek', 'Underwaterworld – Secrets of the Ocean'.

=== Uppspretta ===
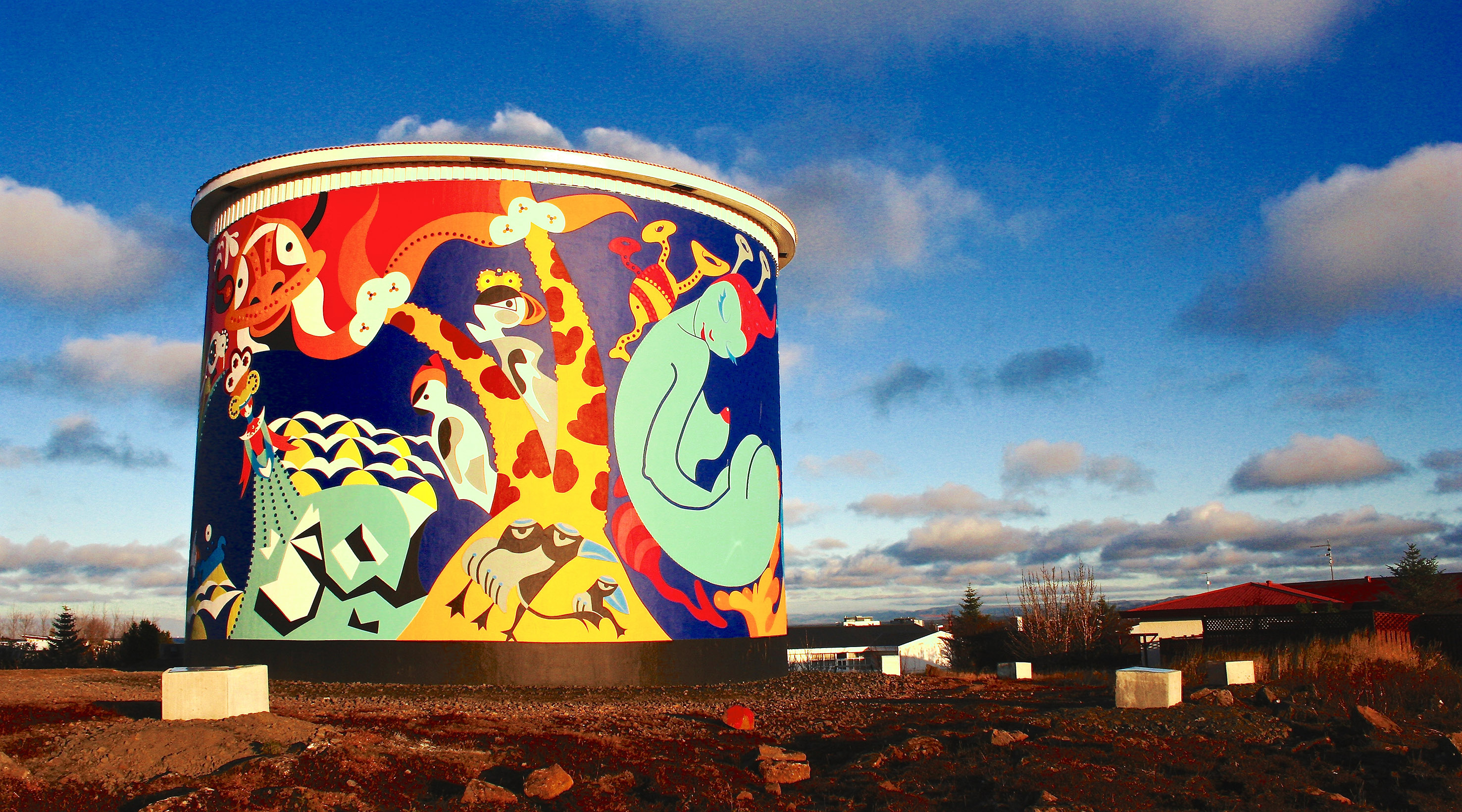
Uppspretta, Keflavík, IS

A neglected water tower situated in Keflavík, Iceland has been transformed magically by the toyists. The colourful story shown on this object represents the legend of Uppspretta. The project was realised during the summer of 2013, enduring very bad weather 11 toyists completed this task in only 6 weeks. With Uppspretta the toyists have done their first step abroad as an artistic collective.

=== Horsepower Mania ===
As a government commission toyism made six sculptures and one painting about the history of the Dutch TT that is part of the Moto GP and is held on the TT Circuit Assen. The six sculptures were placed along the historical route covering several towns in the province of Drenthe. Riders like Marc Marquez, Valentino Rossi, Kevin Schwantz, Jack Middelburg, Wil Hartog and Giacomo Agostini play a prominent role in the artworks.

=== The Flying Dutchman ===
In 2017 toyism celebrated its 25th anniversary in the former building of the KLM Royal Flight Academy at the Groningen Airport Eelde by making the sculpture 'The Flying Dutchman'. The sculpture is both a reference to the KLM Royal Flight Academy and also the Dutch art movement De Stijl. The building was, amongst others, designed by Bart van der Leck.

=== What's for Dinner ===
In 2018 Toyism won first prize in an artist competition set up by the embassy of The Kingdom of the Netherlands in Beijing, China. The mural 'What's for Dinner' was placed on a wall in the 798 Art Zone, part of the Chaoyang District.

=== Noah's Ark - The Philosophy of Faith ===
In Hong Kong at the Kei Faat Primary School (Yau Tong) Toyism created six murals with the theme Noah's Ark in the period from October 1 to October 31, 2018. The project was set up as a community art project and with the help of students, parents and teachers the Toyists painted the murals.

== Representation ==
The toyists are represented by Toyisme Studio in The Netherlands.

== Bibliography ==
- 1993 - The Fairy Tale of the Toyists
- 1996 - The History of the Toyists
- 2004 - The Building Blocks of the Toyists
- 2004 - Playing Dice with the Toyists
- 2004 - Invasion of the Toyists
- 2005 - Let the Games Begin
- 2007 - Art through the Mind of a Toyist
- 2011 - Connecting the Dots
- 2011 - The Toyists have landed
- 2012 - Toyism Behind the Mask
- 2013 - Toyism Making History
- 2013 - More Art by Printing
- 2014 - Uppspretta

=== Quotations ===
- "Until now, every artist has played an individual game within his own composition. Now the compositions have become the starting point for everyone, so that the work of two artists can be combined into one work of art via certain rules of play."
- "What I find even more interesting is the contemporary sense of Toyism. We live in an era of individualism with egocentric characteristics. The toyists present themselves as a group. That is exactly what distinguishes them from the rest."
- "Establish the framework. Determine the playing field. Come to clear agreements (...) In contrast to what is often believed, agreements and strict rules need not interfere with the pleasure or the creative process. Drawing the lines during the game and knowing the boundaries of the playing field, handling restrictions creatively and attempting to obtain the maximum out of yourself and the game, those are things that toyists know all about. Actually, that's what it's all about for them"
- "There are countless artists, but countable are those who are on the leading edge."

== See also ==
- The Dot (Toyism)
- Uppspretta
