= Uppspretta =

Toyist artwork in Keflavík, Iceland

Coordinates: 63.999547°N 22.569056°W

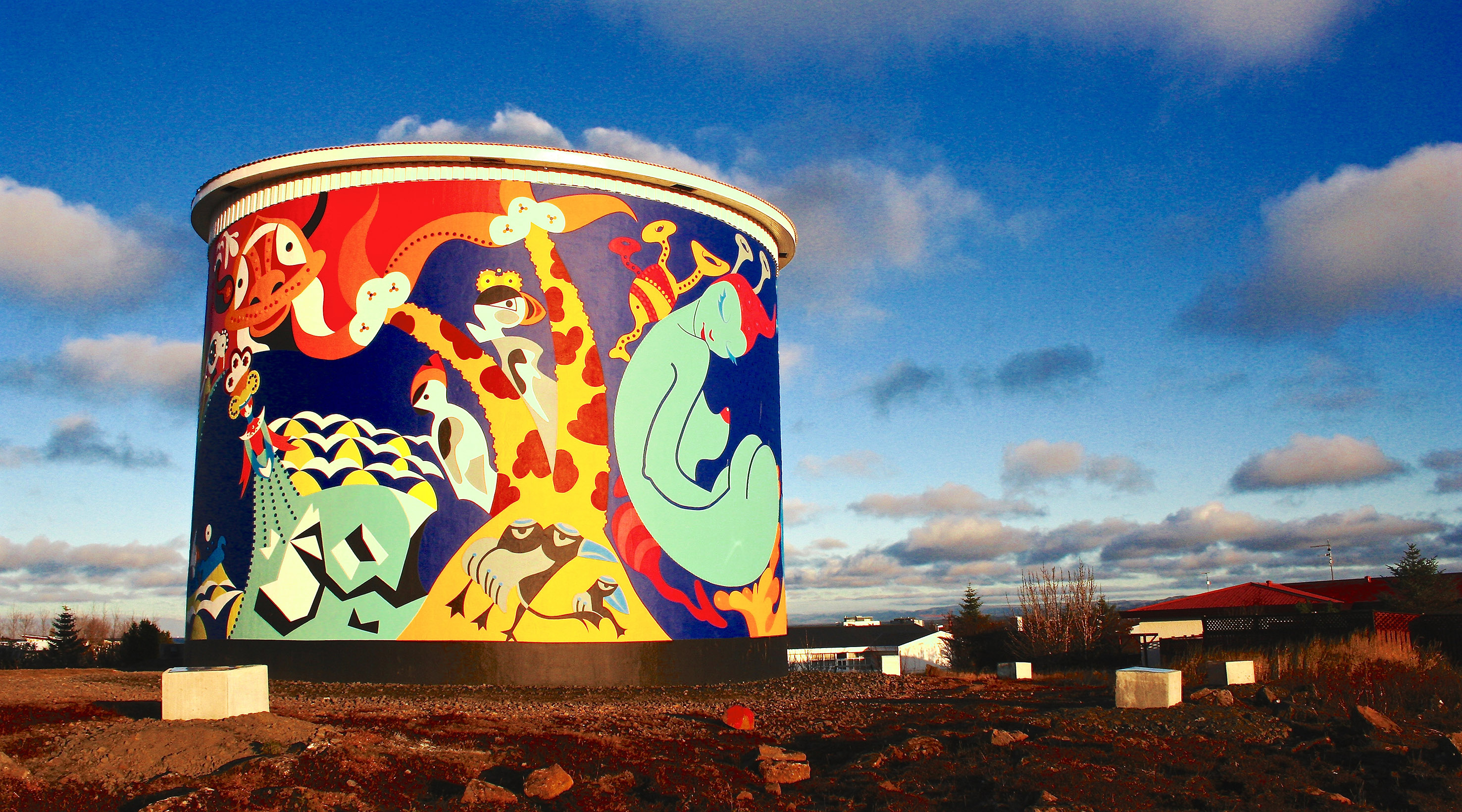
- Artist: Toyists
- Year: 2013
- Subject: Icelandic mythology
- Dimensions: 900 cm × 3600 cm (350 in × 1,400 in)
- Location: Keflavík
- Website: uppspretta.com

Uppspretta is the name of a Toyist artwork situated in the Icelandic town of Keflavík. In 2013, a neglected water tower being nine meters in height and thirty-six meters in circumference, was transformed into an object of art. The painting shows the story of a puffin named Uppspretta.

This largest artistic wall painting of Iceland was officially opened by mayor Árni Sigfússon of Reykjanesbær on 6 September 2013. It is situated in a popular recreation area of Keflavík.

== Project ==
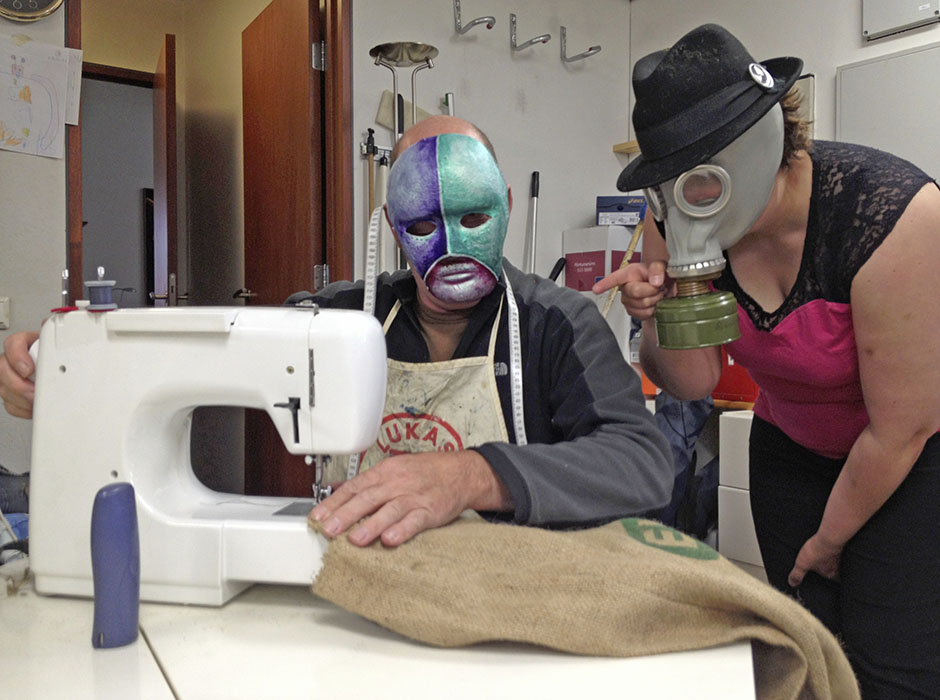
The sewing of coffee bags

The transformation of the tower into an artwork was actuated by an earlier work of the Toyists, namely De Stip (The Dot) in Emmen, Netherlands, when a gas storage container of 22 meters high was repainted into a work of art. This Icelandic project was financed partially by the municipality of Reykjanesbær, through sponsorship and crowdfunding. Because of this project, the Toyists were also asked by a hotel in Keflavík, to paint its facade and a dining room in the same style.

The project started on 24 July 2013, and was completed after seven weeks. Eleven Toyists from five different countries were involved. During the activities, Iceland had its worst weather conditions since the summer of 1923. Plastic could not be used as a protection material, because it is impermeable to air. The strong winds blew apart the plastic, revealing the artwork before the project was finished. For that reason, coffee bags were used in order to be able to complete the project. Two hundred of them were sewn together and wrapped around the tower.

== Theme and design ==
Whilst toyism is to be classified under figurative art, one cannot subdivide it further into one particular style. A common denominator of the artworks of the Toyists is that they seem recognizable as well as unworldly. The theme of this artwork is a story that resembles a legend. It was invented by the art group for this occasion. In comparison, other works of this group are based on anecdotes, fantasies and philosophies too.

Sólfar

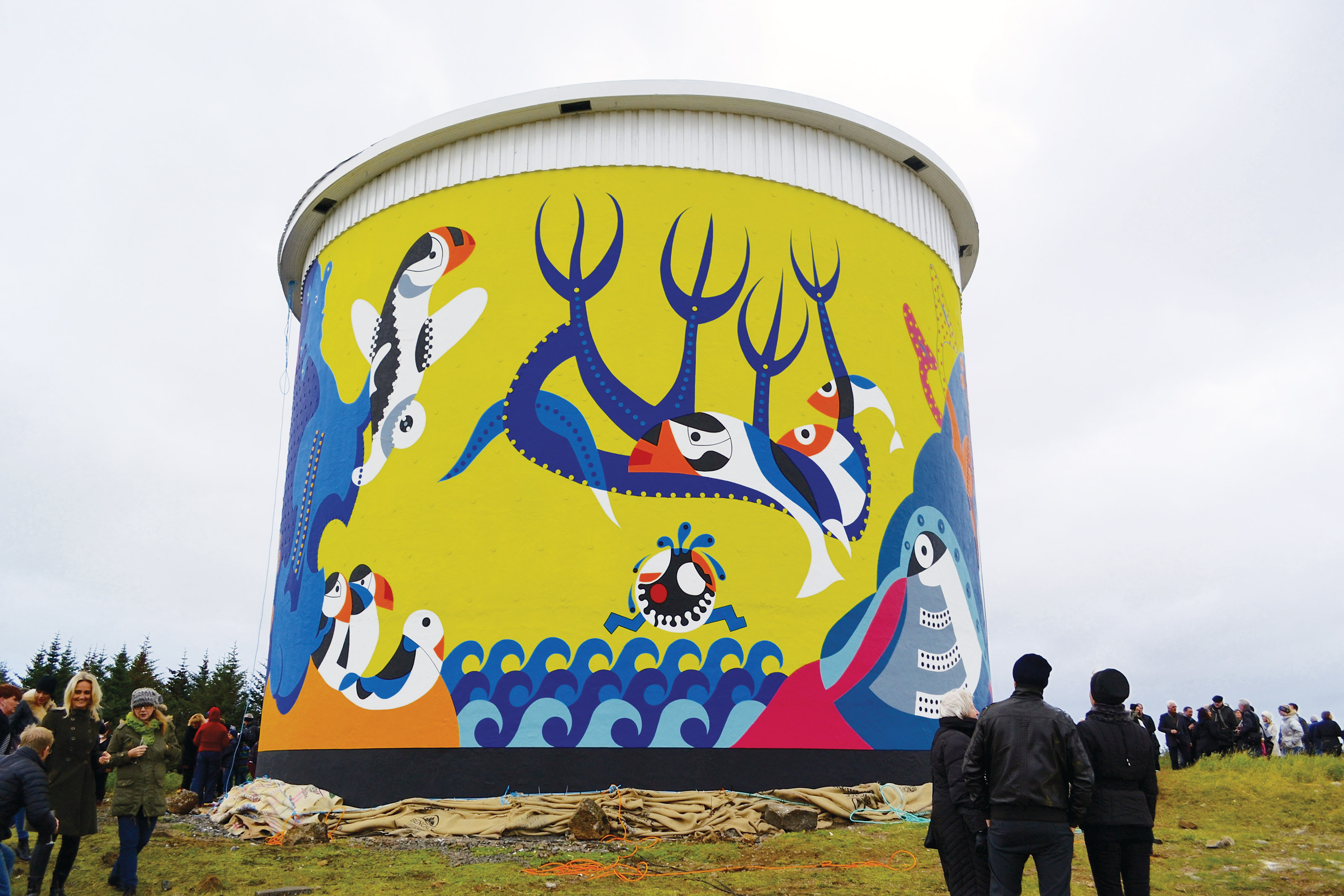
the dream boat Sólfar

Sólfar (English: The Sun Voyager) is a work of the Icelandic artist Jón Gunnar Árnason and was the inspiration for the dream boat that brought Uppspretta back to Iceland. Árnason intended his creation to be a dream boat which travels to undiscovered areas. There's a dream boat in the story of the toyists as well, that brings the main character Uppspretta back to Iceland IJsland. In the images at the right the inspiration of the Sólfar of Árnason can be observed in the painting of the toyists.

Another inspiration came from Iceland, like a geyser; Uppspretta means source. The vikings, who are believed by the artists to be the first inhabitants of Iceland, appear in the form of Freyja, the goddess of love from the Norse mythology. There's also an image of a viking ship.

== The story behind ==
The main character of this story is a puffin named Uppspretta, a curious bird that wanted to discover the world. On his search, he read many books on the history of Iceland. When he discovered that its first citizens came from Norway, he decided to go and find his female puffin there. His parents had warned him that he was not capable of flying above land, but he ignored their warning, flew over land, and fell to earth.

However, he did not land in Norway, but to the south in the Netherlands. There he was found by a man that took care of him. At the man’s home Uppspretta fell asleep and dreamed about people and music. In his dreams a ship came into sight that took him aboard, travelled over the seas, and subsequently through the air to Keflavík. When he arrived at home, he married a female puffin from Norway and became the leader of all puffins on Iceland.

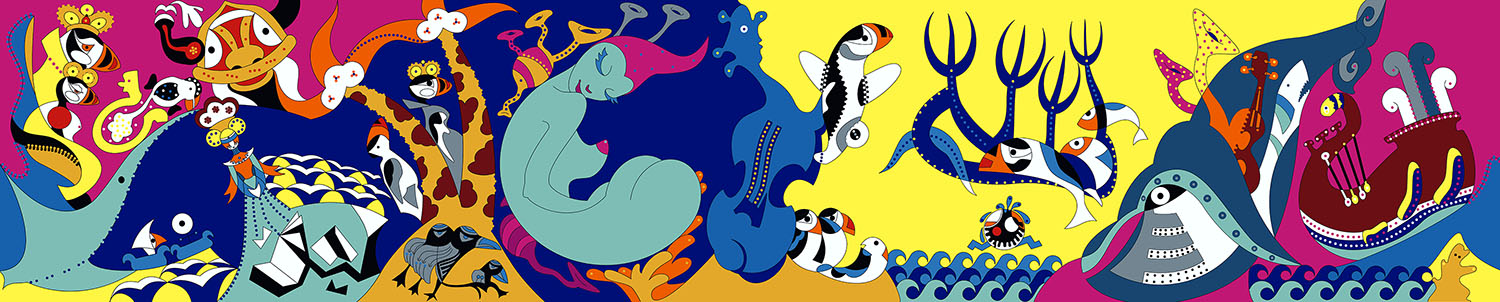
representation of the travel of Uppspretta

== Gallery ==
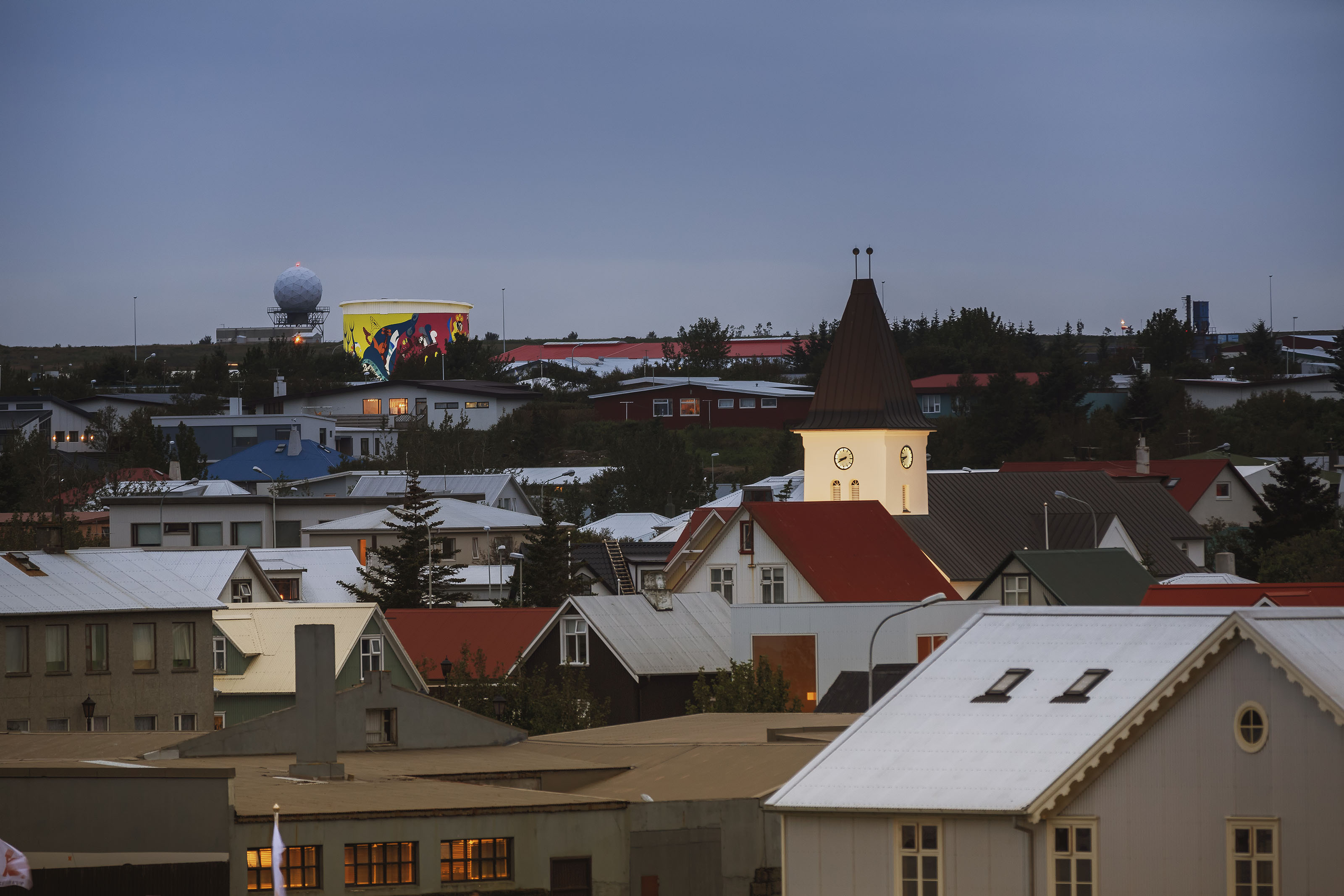
Landscape of Keflavík

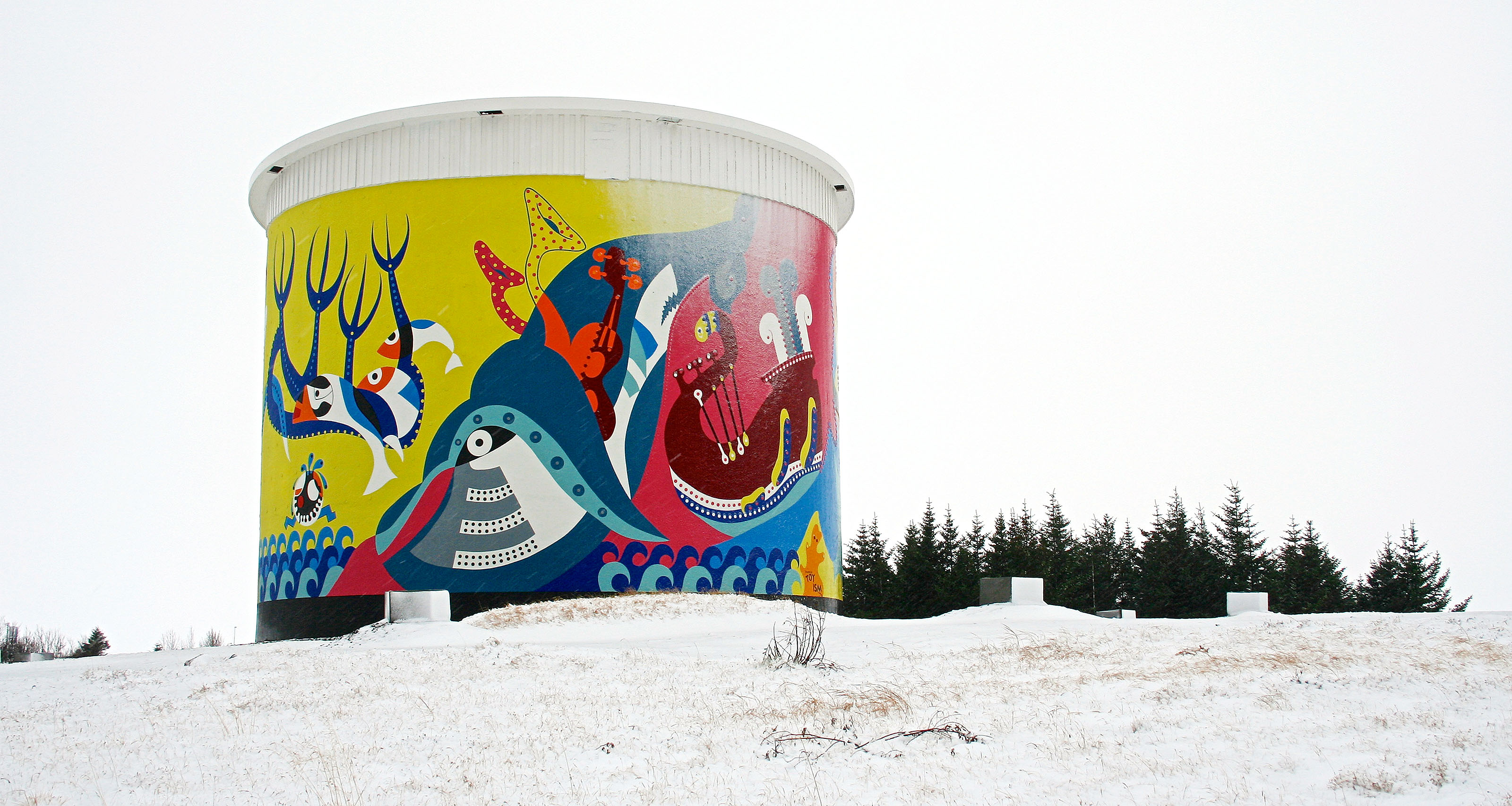
Uppspretta in winter

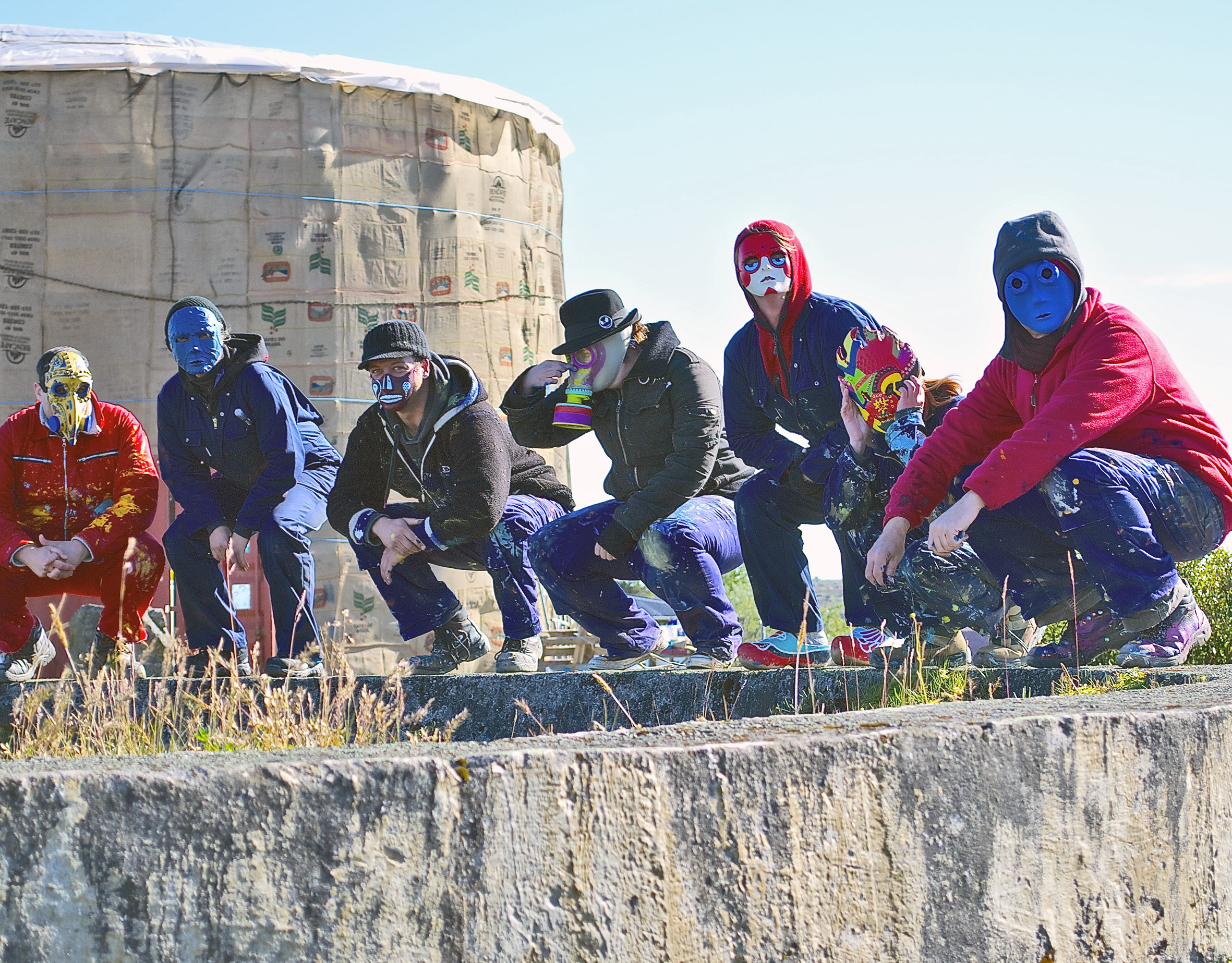
Toyists at Uppspretta

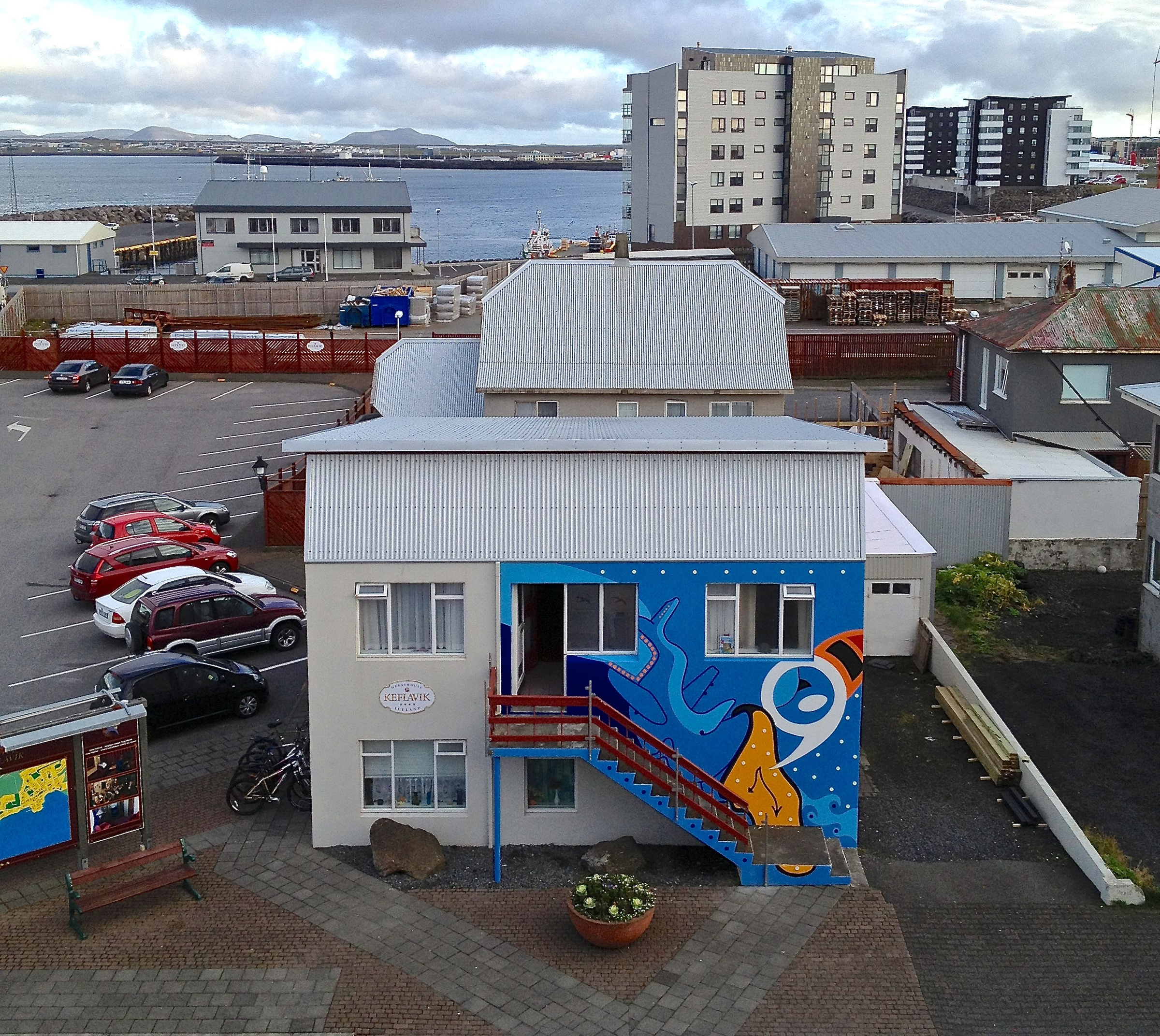
Facade of the local hotel
