= Sergey Mikhailovich Skubko =

Russian painter (1922–2007)

Sergey Michailovich Skubko
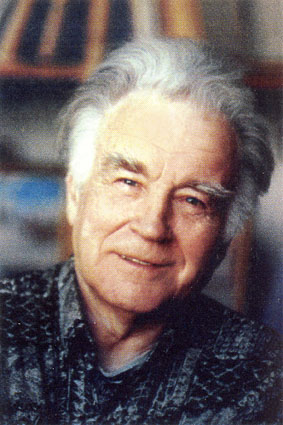
- Born: November 6, 1922; Stashevka, Primorsky Krai, Russia/USSR
- Died: January 21, 2007 (aged 84); Moscow, Russia
- Education: V. Surikov Moscow state artistic institute
- Known for: Painting
- Movement: Realism

Sergey Mikhailovich Skubko (Russian: Сергей Михайлович Скубко; 1922–2007) was a Soviet painter. He lived and worked in Moscow (since 1945) and is a representative of the Moscow school of paintings.

== Early life ==
Sergey Skubko born in 1922 in Stachevka, a Cossack settlement in the Russian Far Eastern Primorsky Krai (near the Chinese border). Died in Moscow in 2007. His family was stripped of property during collectivization and moved to Vladivostok in 1930. Skubko received American lend-lease aid in the port of Vladivostok during the Second World War. Arrived in Moscow from Vladivostok in 1945 to seek higher education. He graduated from V. Surikov Moscow State Artistic Institute in 1951.

He married Lyudmila Skubko-Karpas in 1948. They raised two sons, Yury (1953) and Alexey (1958).

== Career ==
His first exhibition was in 1952. He became a member of the Moscow Painters Union in 1954. He worked as a painter for more than half a century, creating realist traditions of the Moscow painters school in all genres - portrait, landscapes, and still life. In the 1950s and 1960s he created historic pictures and portraits of political personalities, scientists, travelers, peasants. In the 1970s and 1980s, he travelled Central Asia painting landscapes of the Pamir mountains and other places. In the 1980s and 1990s he worked in the ancient city of Suzdal. He continued to create landscapes of Russian nature in the Moscow family dacha of Sokolova Pustyn village on the banks of the Oka river. His paintings reside in museums, art galleries and private collections in Russia and abroad.

== Gallery ==
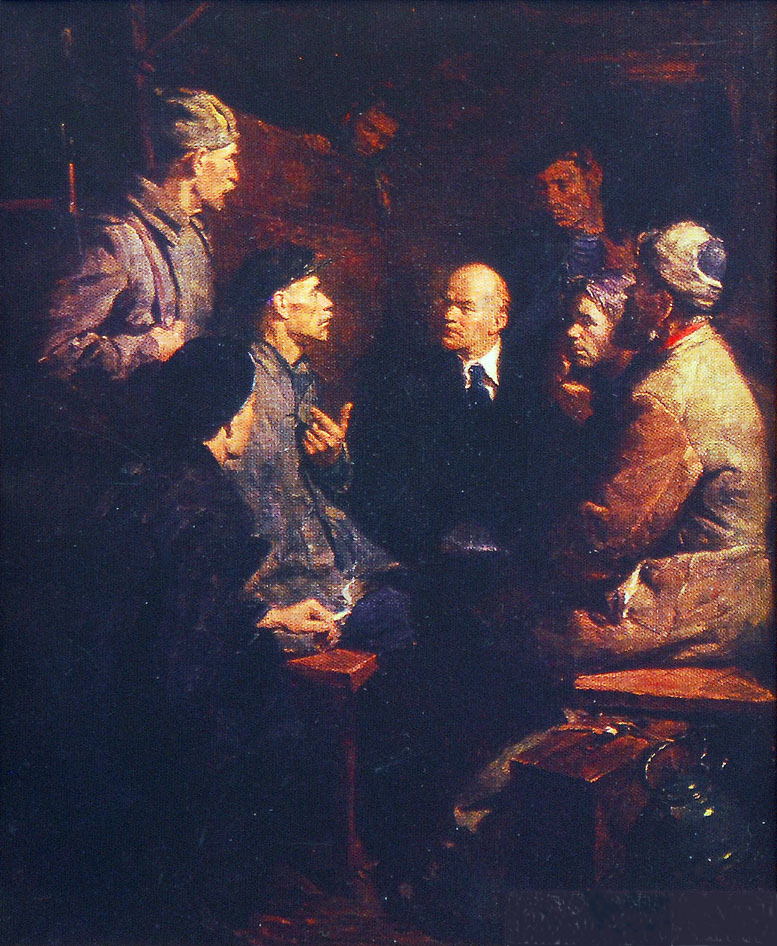
Lenin on the way to Petrograd in 1917. 1954

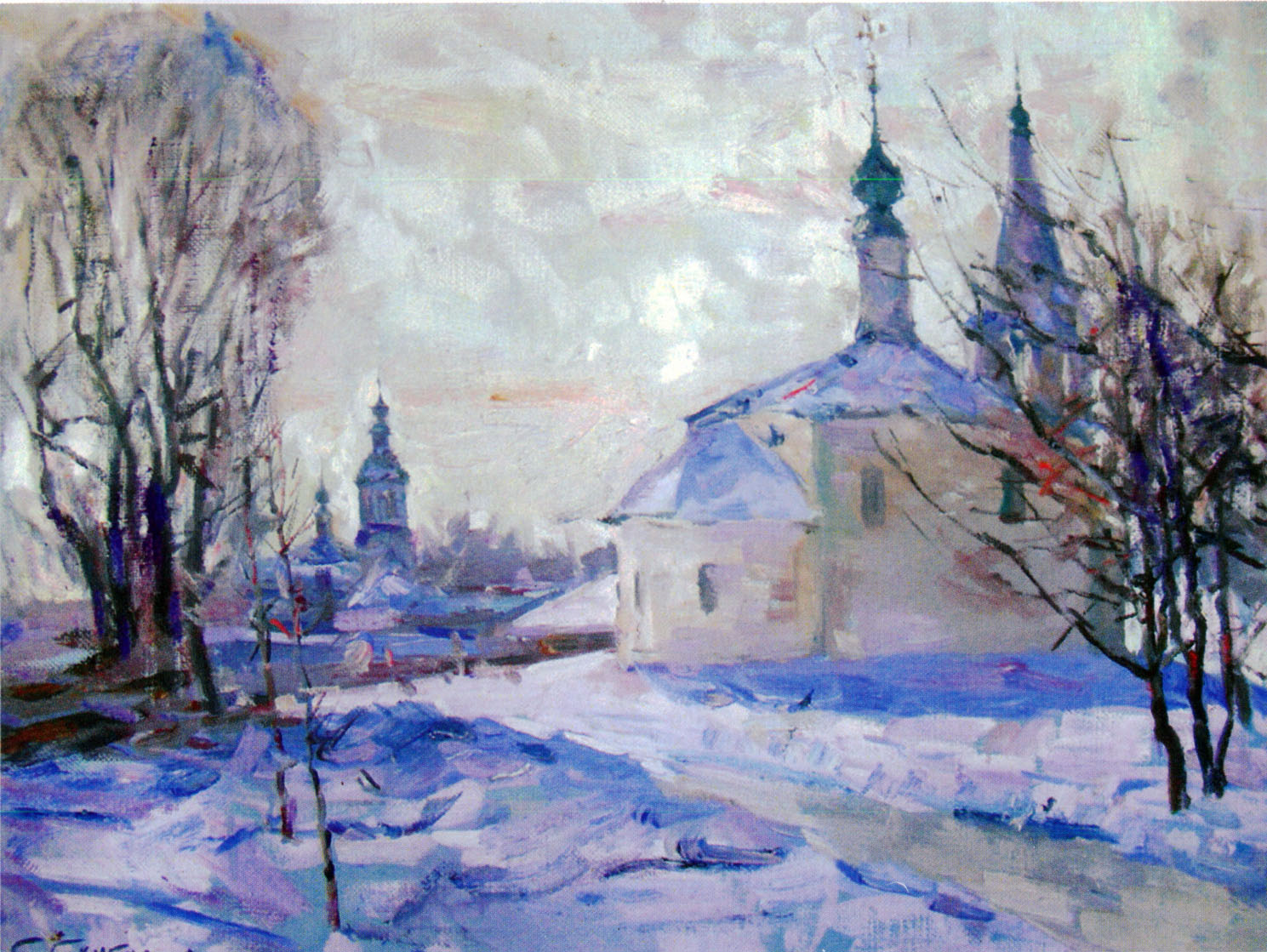
Winter in Suzdal. 1981

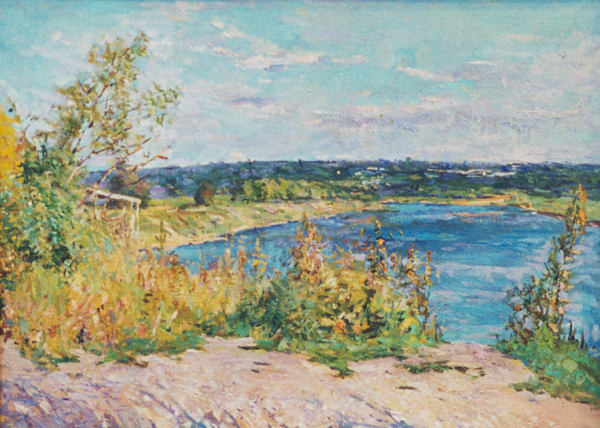
Oka River. 1995

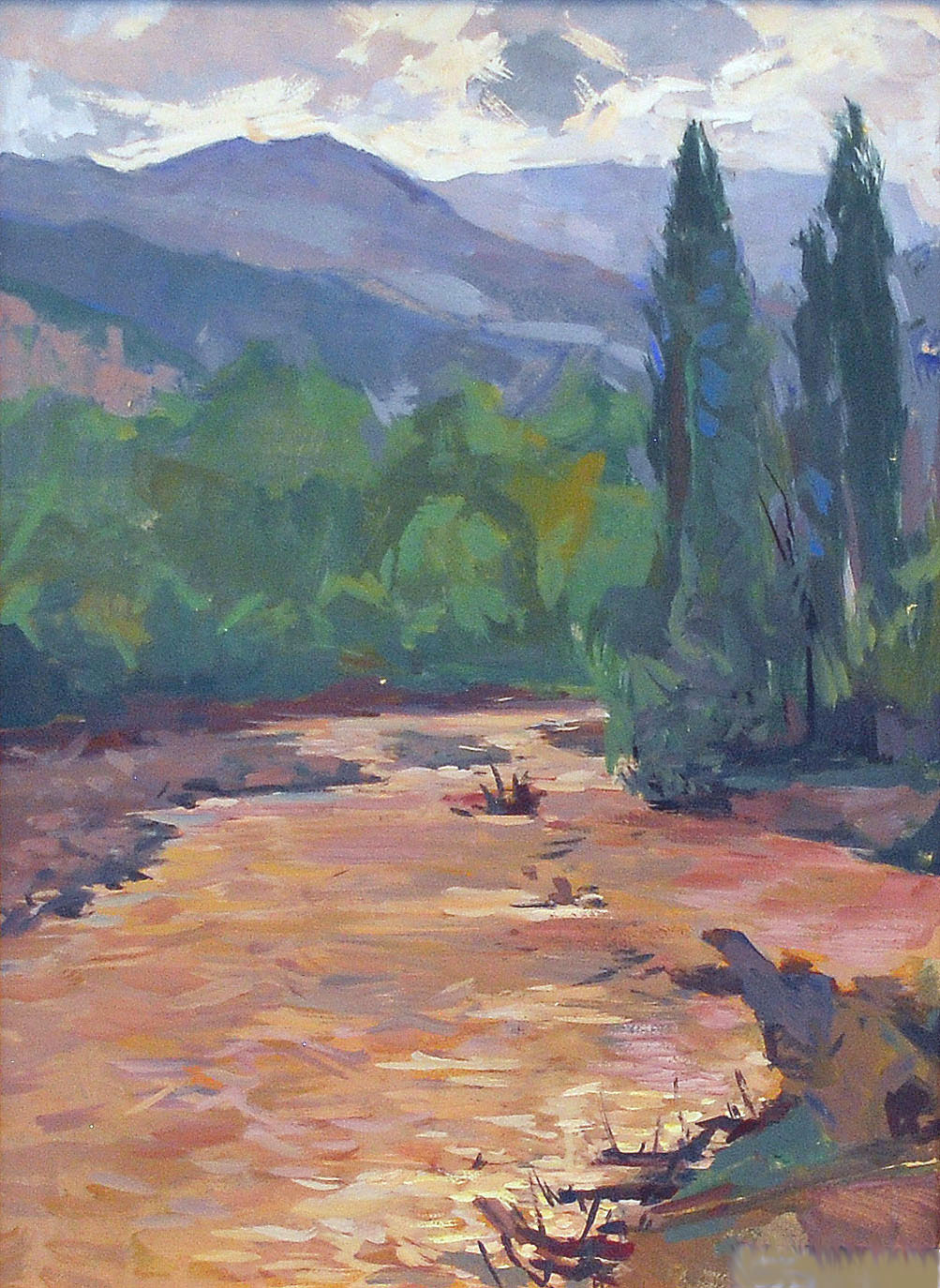
Early spring in mountains. 1981

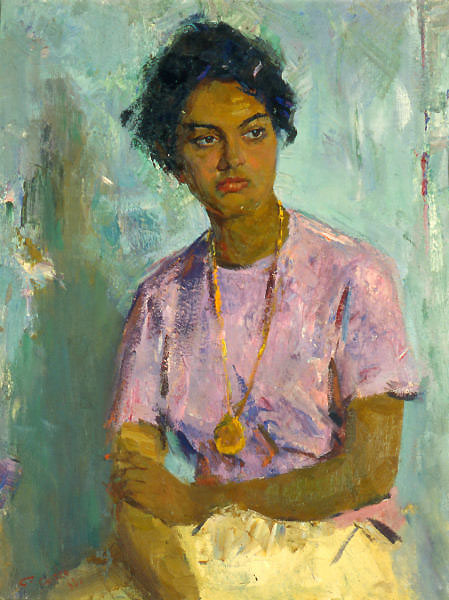
Student from Rio Negro, Brazil. 1963
