= Lyudmila Skubko-Karpas =

Soviet painter born in Moscow

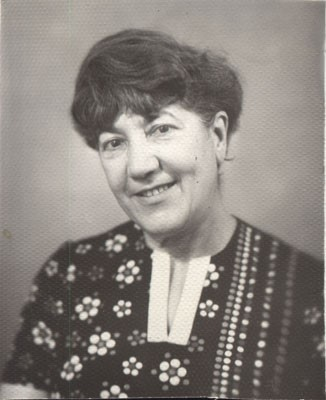
- Born: April 13, 1923; Saint Petersburg, Russia/USSR
- Died: June 1, 2012 (aged 89); Moscow, Russia
- Education: V. Surikov Moscow state artistic institute
- Known for: Painting
- Movement: Realism

Lyudmila Skubko-Karpas was a Soviet painter who lived and worked in Moscow from 1924 on.

== Biography ==
Lyudmila Skubko-Karpas was born in 1923 in Petrograd (St. Petersburg). She lived in Moscow since 1924 with the exception of 3 years of war-time evacuation to the Urals (1941–1944) and 7 years of life in Paris, France (1990–1997).

Developed traditions of Russian realistic fine art and Soviet impressionism. Exhibited mainly works in oil and pastel, her prolific, mainly pencil drawings were practically unknown up to now. Started drawing and painting in childhood. Her masterpiece "Head of an elk" charcoal drawing, 1933, is a work of a 10-year child. In 1947-48 studied in a private studio of Robert Falk, whose lessons helped her become a subtle colourist. Academic education: V.I. Surikov Moscow State Artistic Institute (class of G. Ryazsky) graduated in 1952 Her diploma "Детская радиопередача» («Child broadcast"), 1952, was exhibited in socialist countries of Eastern Europe a best diploma work.

She married fellow painter, Sergey Mikhailovich Skubko, in 1984. They raised two sons: Yury (1953) and Alexey (1958). Skubko-Karpas died in Moscow in 2012.

In 1974-1978 participated in group expositions by most talented women-artists in the Moscow House of Writers (famous MASSOlit from Bulgakov’s "Master and Margareth") 1991, 1993 participated in Salon d'Automne (Paris) 1995 Personal exhibition in Karnegy foundation Centre in Moscow 2013 Memorial exhibition in Tverskaya-Yamskaya, 20 Art Gallery of Moscow painters Hundreds of paintings are disposed in museums, art-galleries and private collections in Russia and abroad (especially France).

== Gallery ==
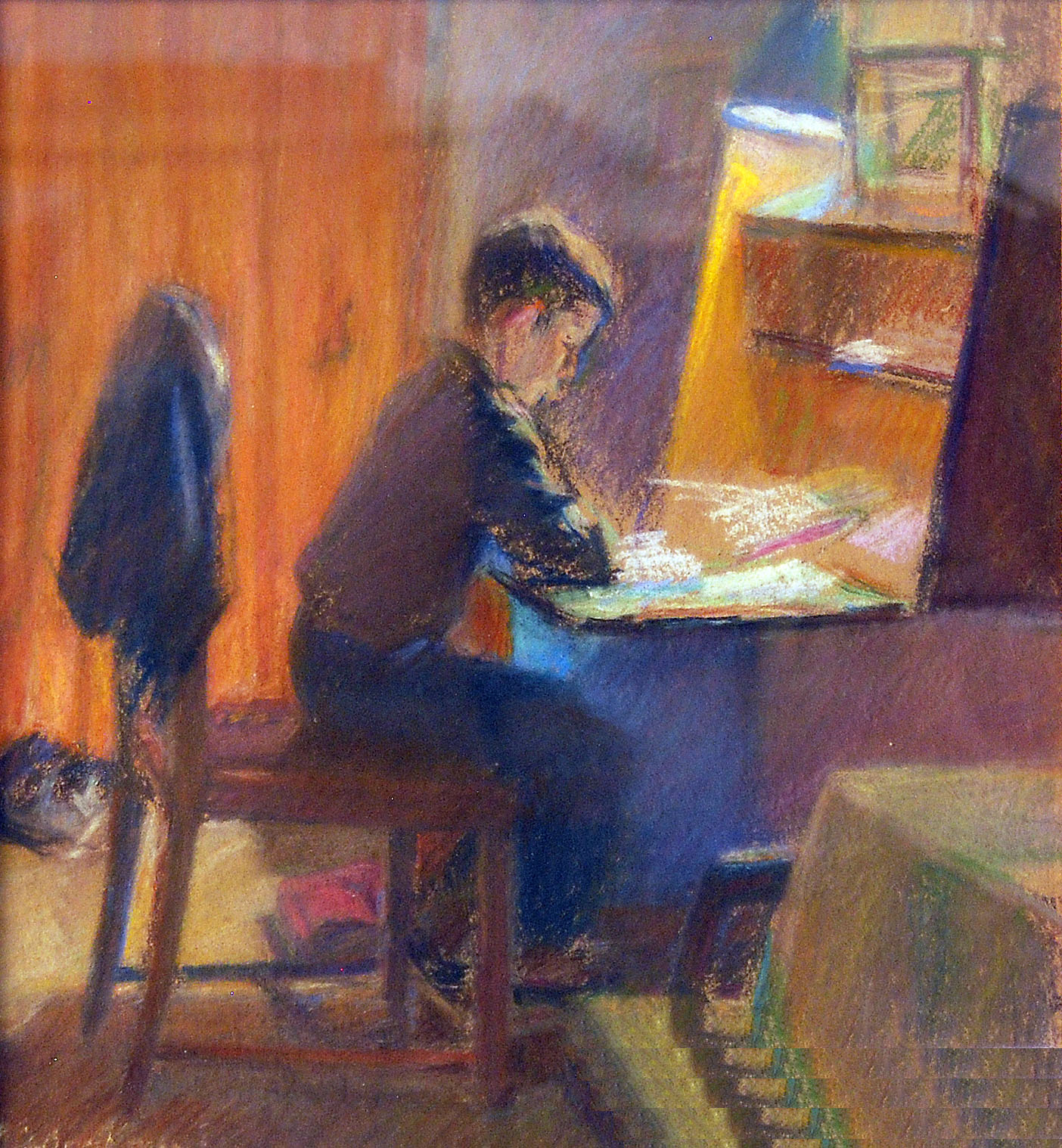
Alesha at his homework. 1966

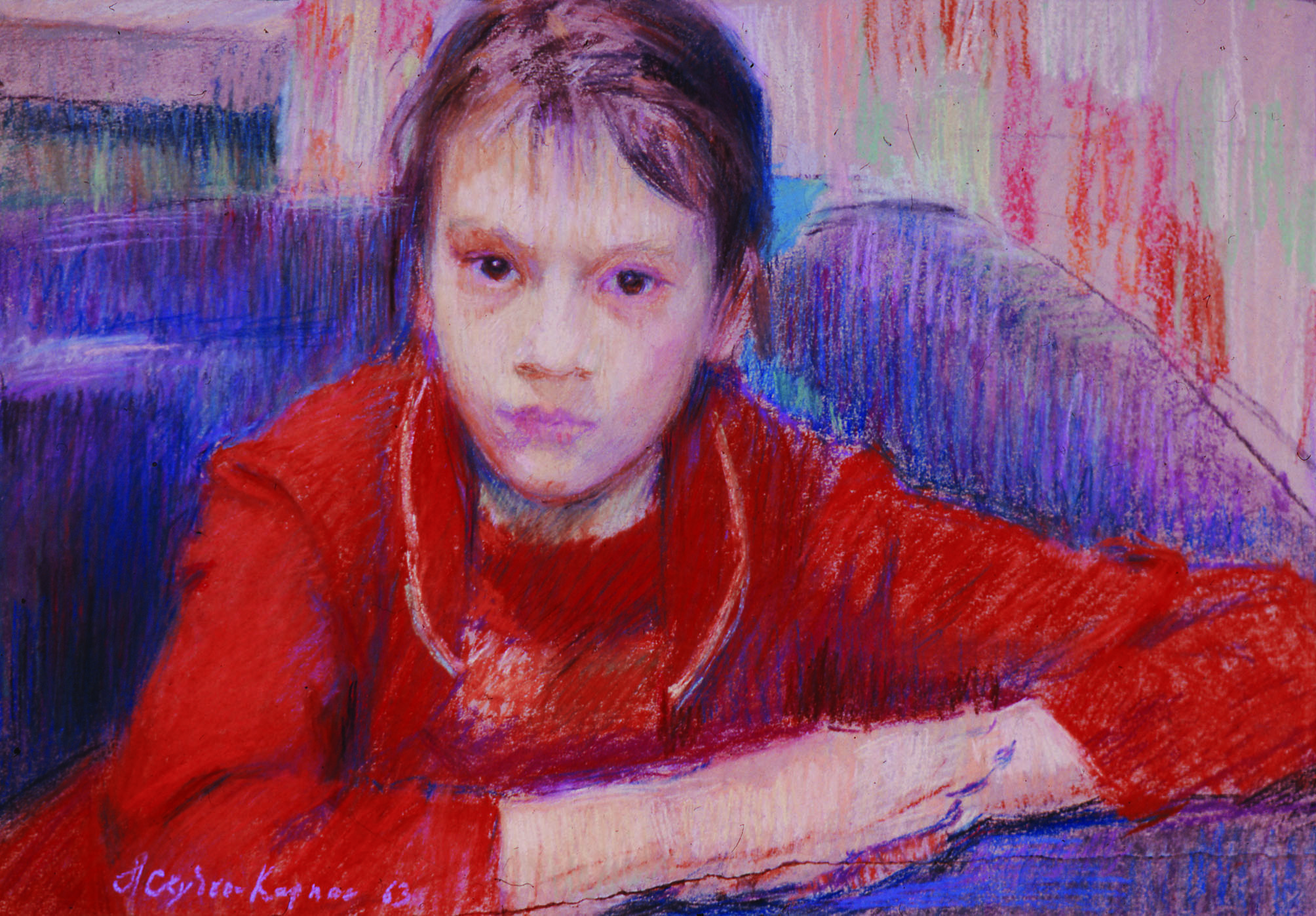
Girl in red. 1963

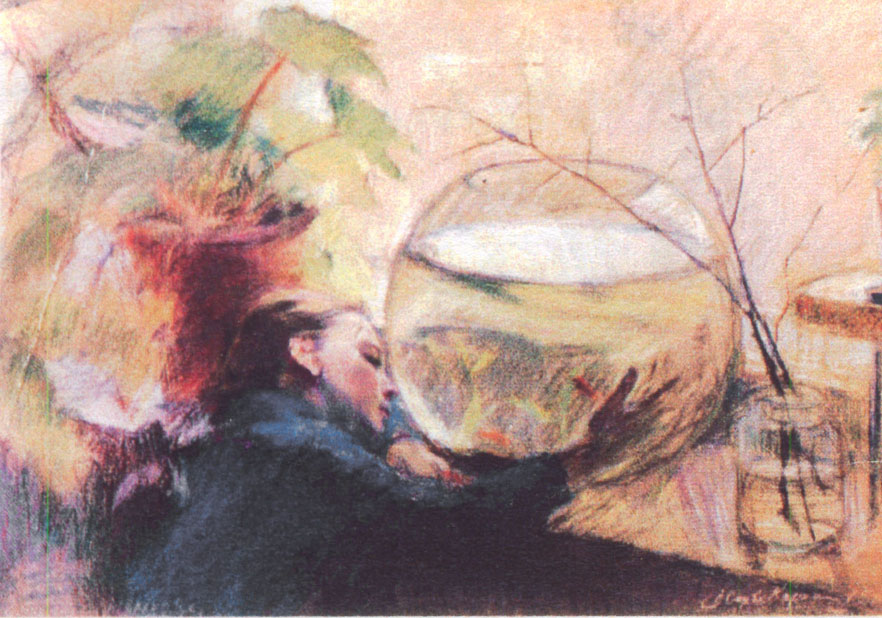
Girl at the aquarium. 1975

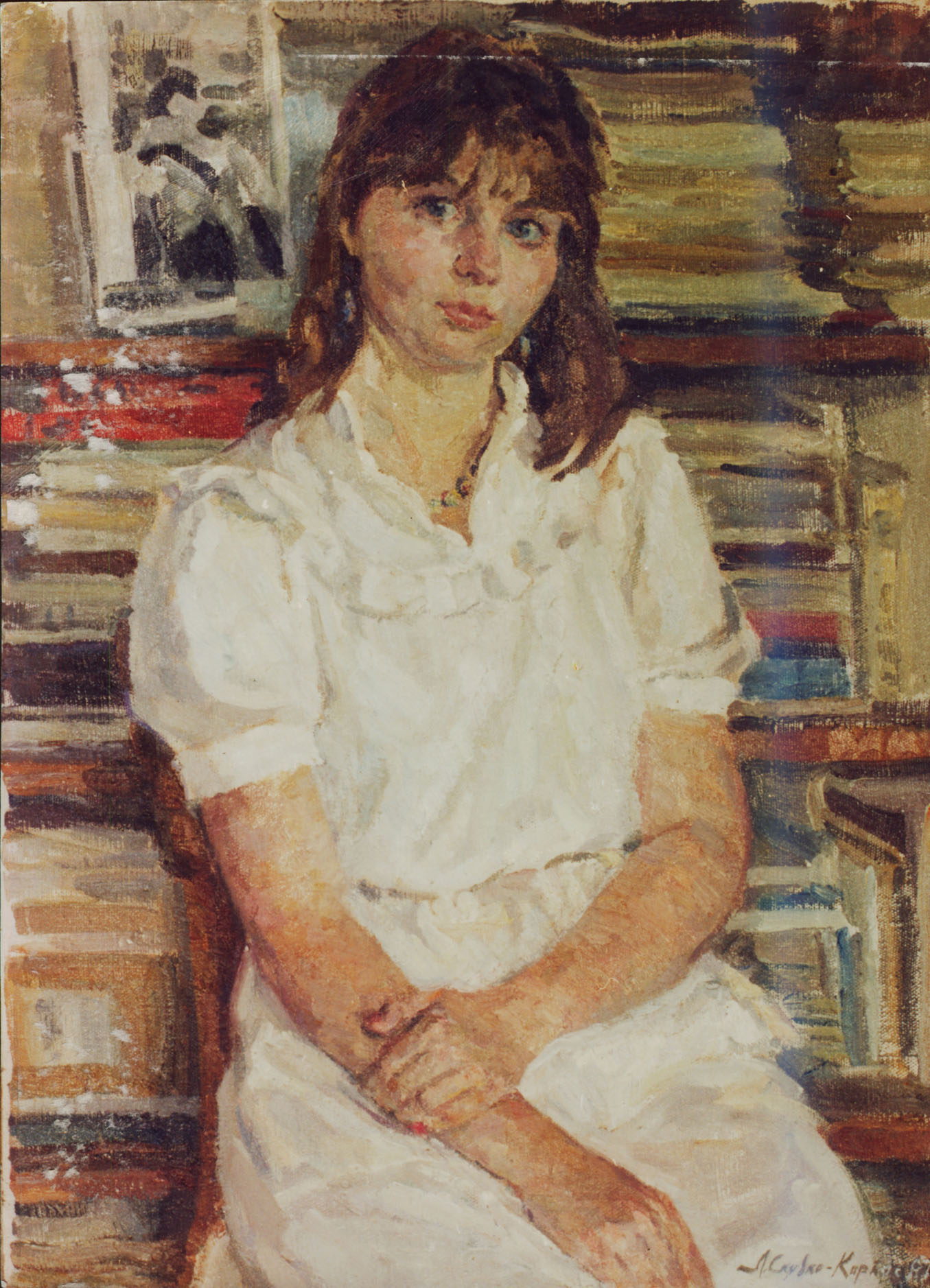
Girl in white. 1980-е

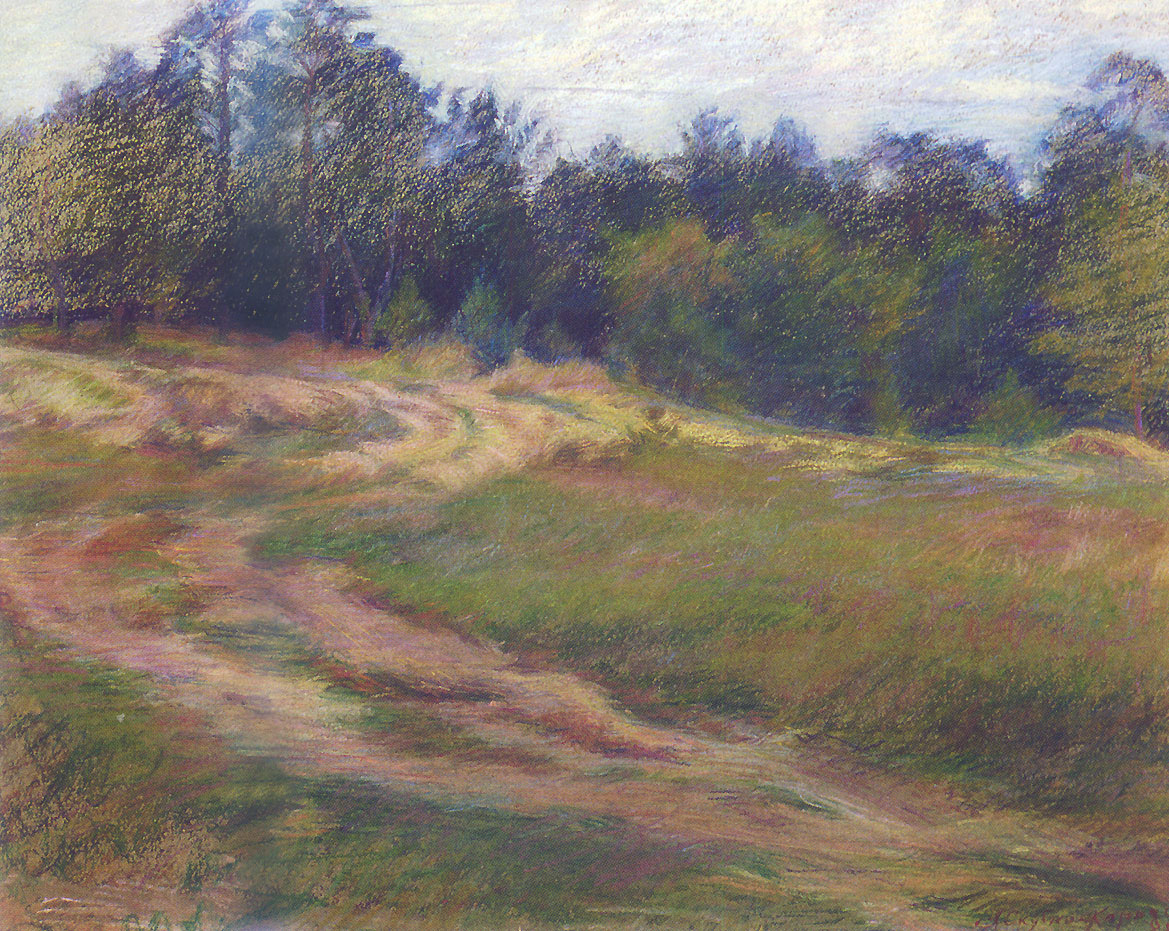
Road to the village Sokolova Pustyn. 1980

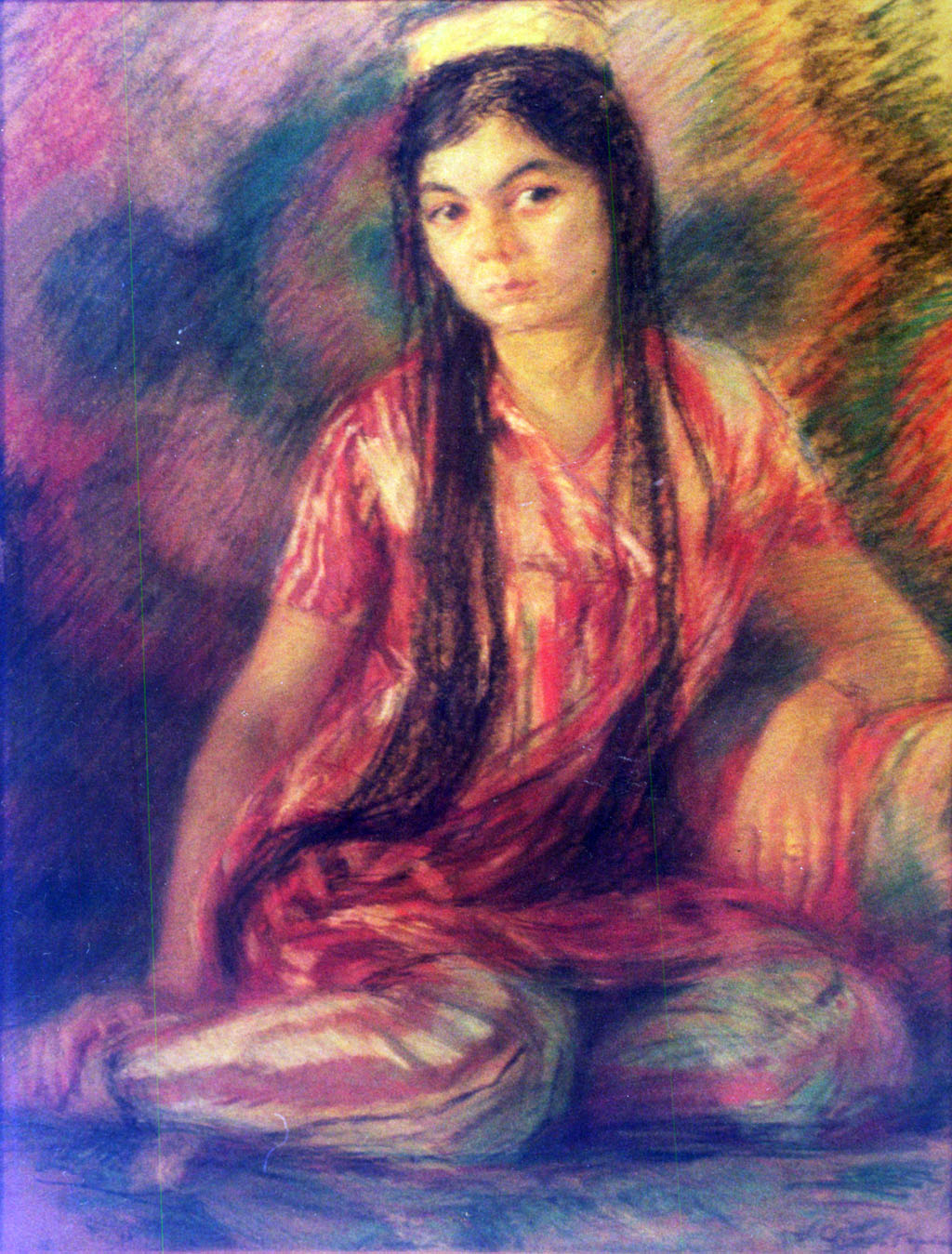
Zamira. 1980

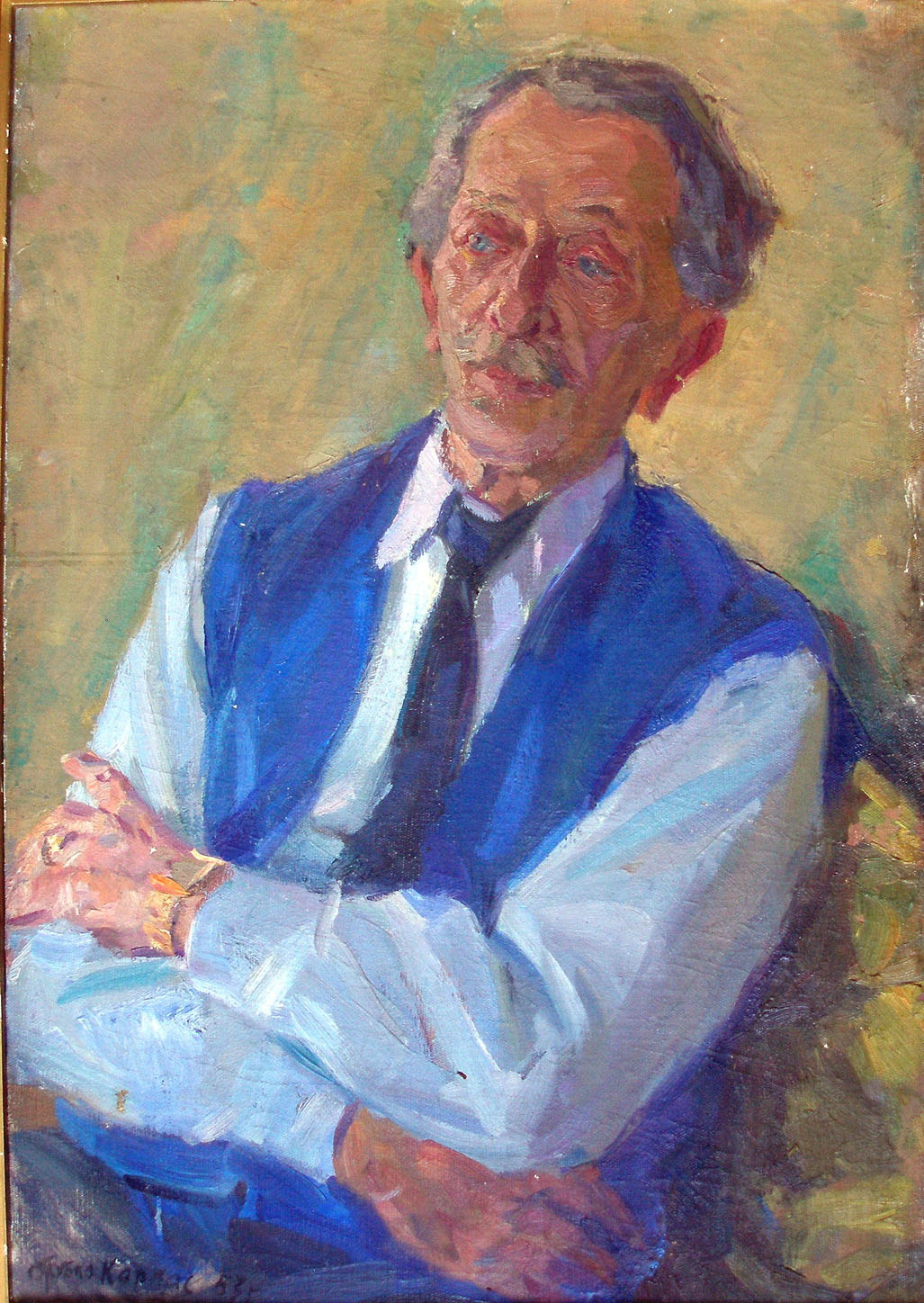
Man's portrait. 1957

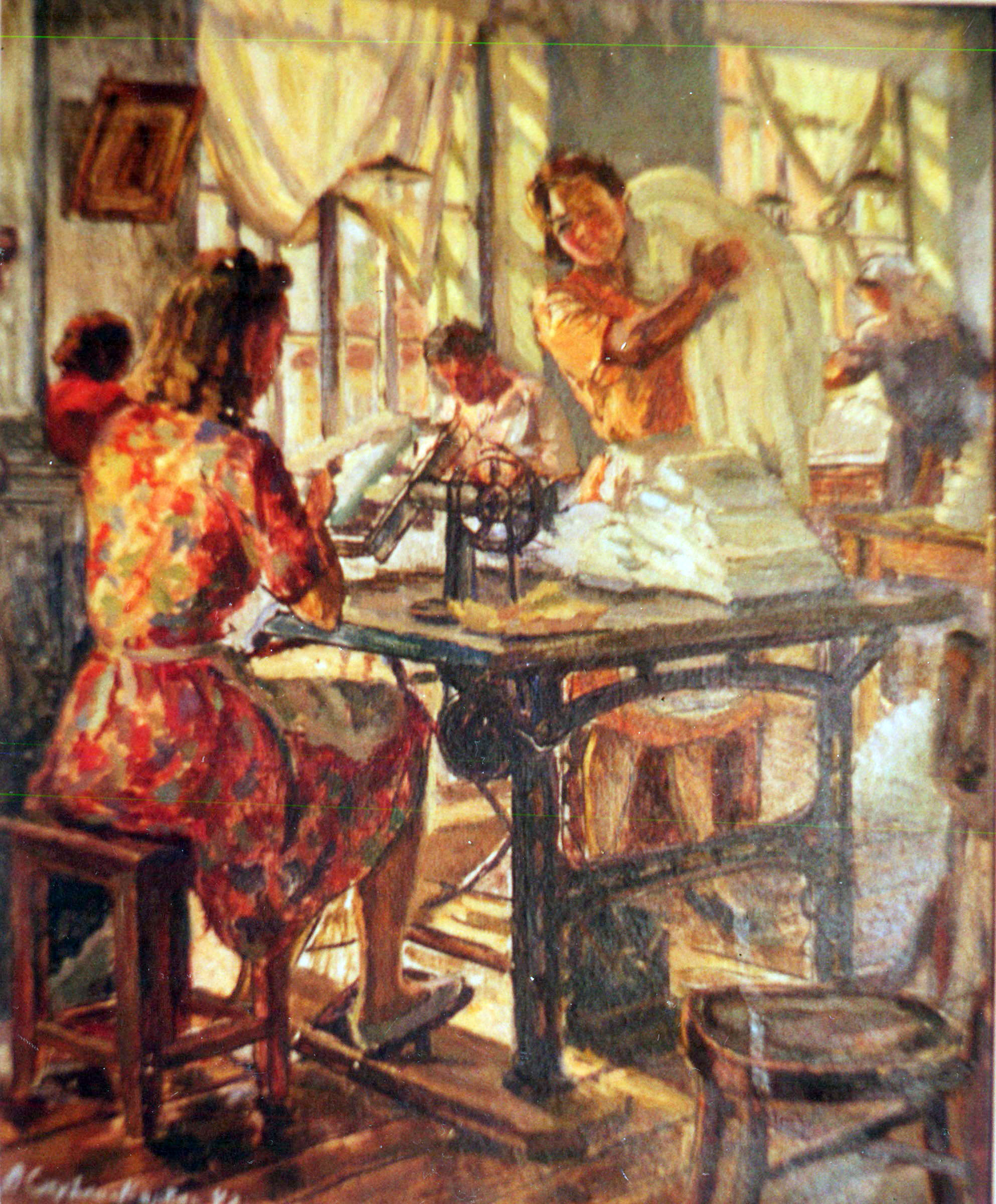
At the lace factory. 1947

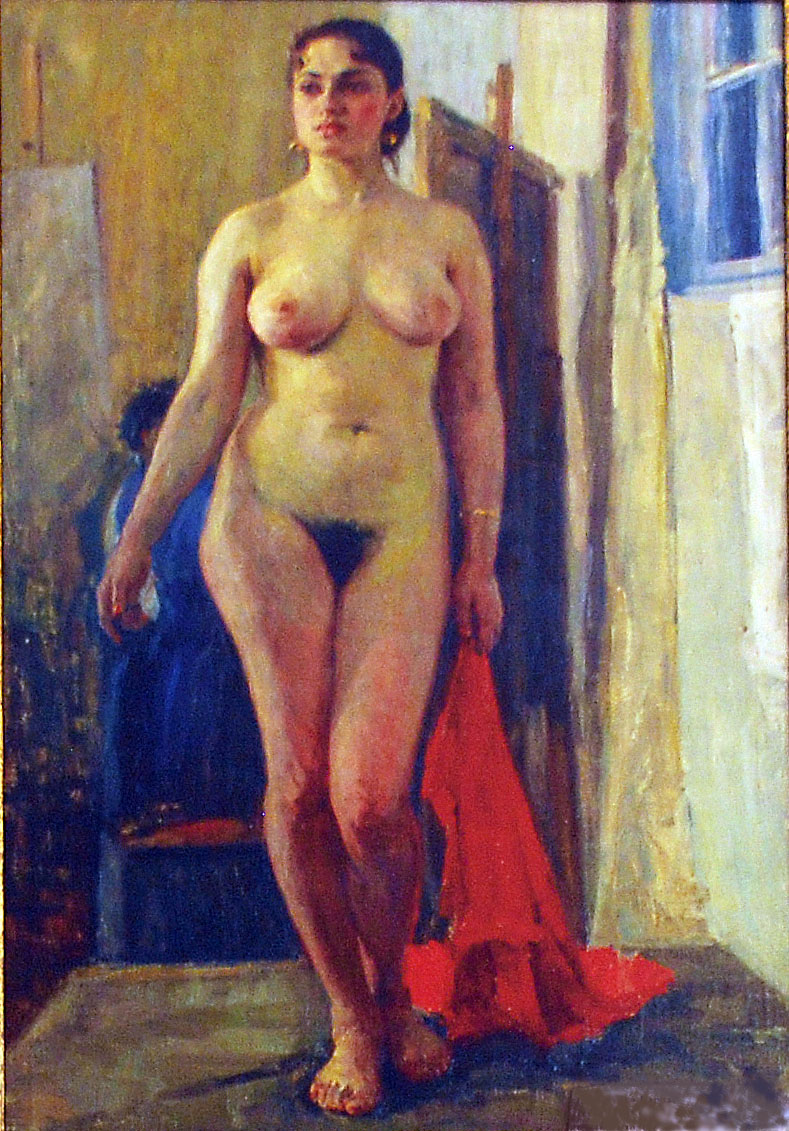
Nelia. 1948

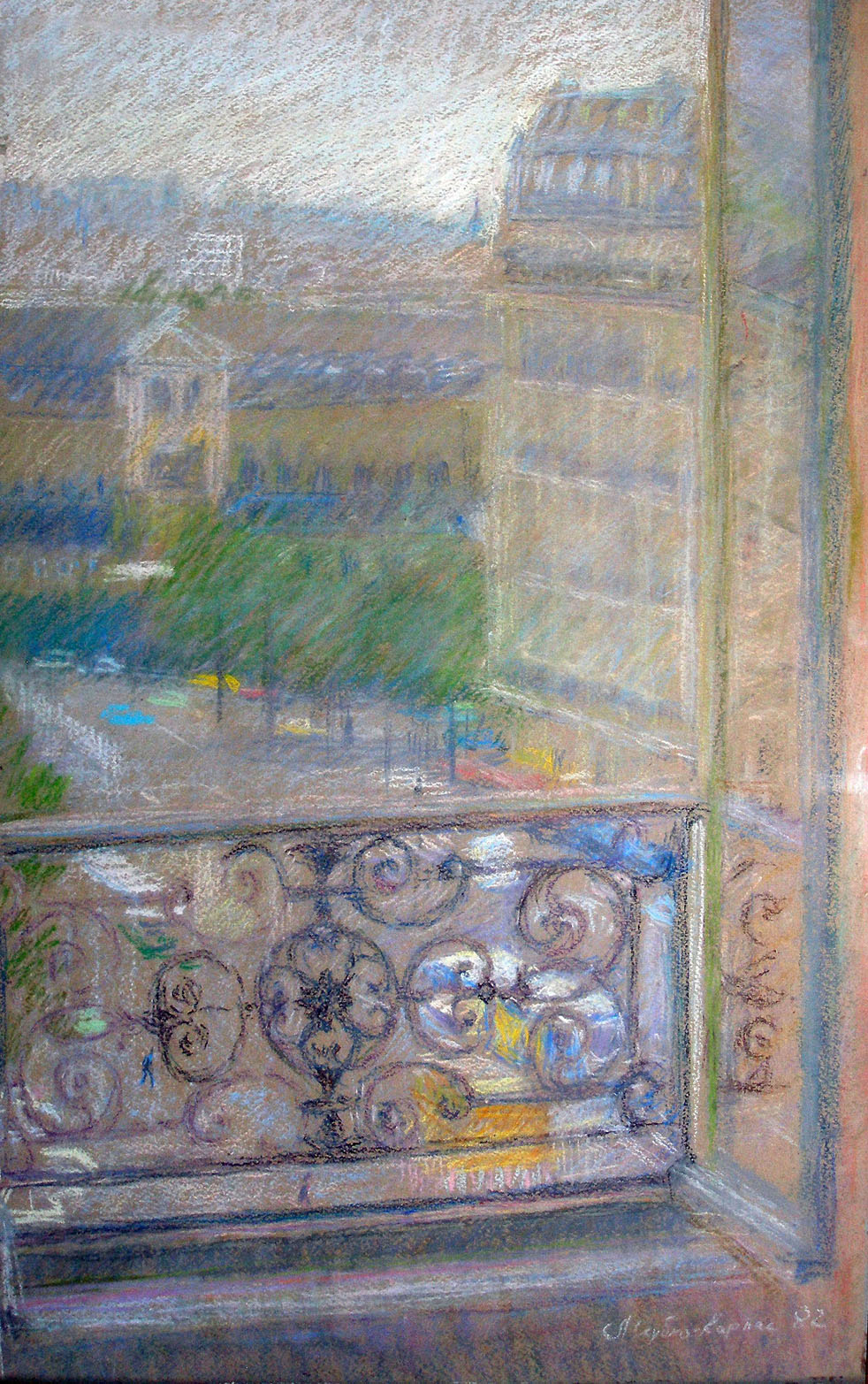
Paris. View from the attic in the square De la Gare Est. 1982

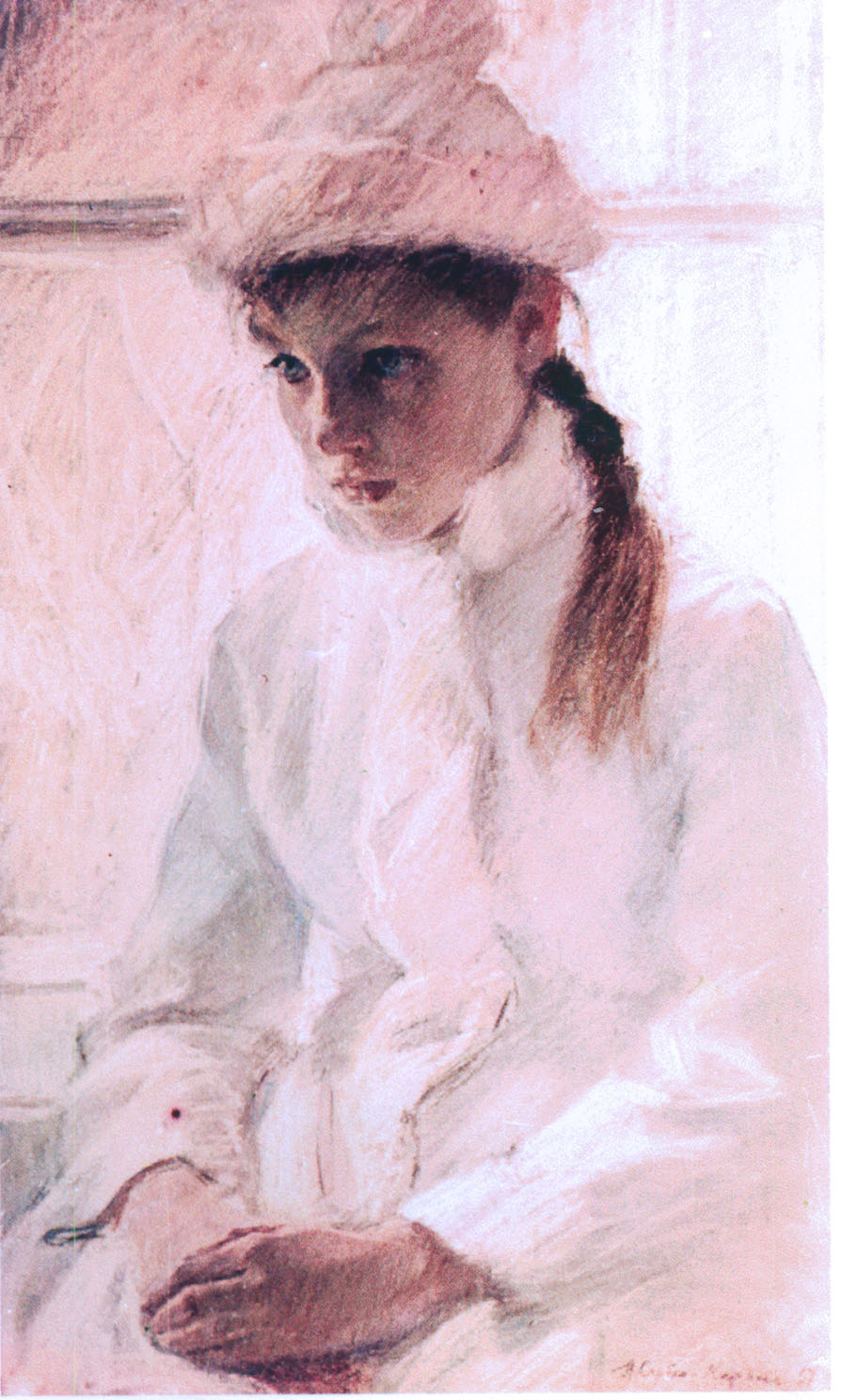
Snegurochka. 1967

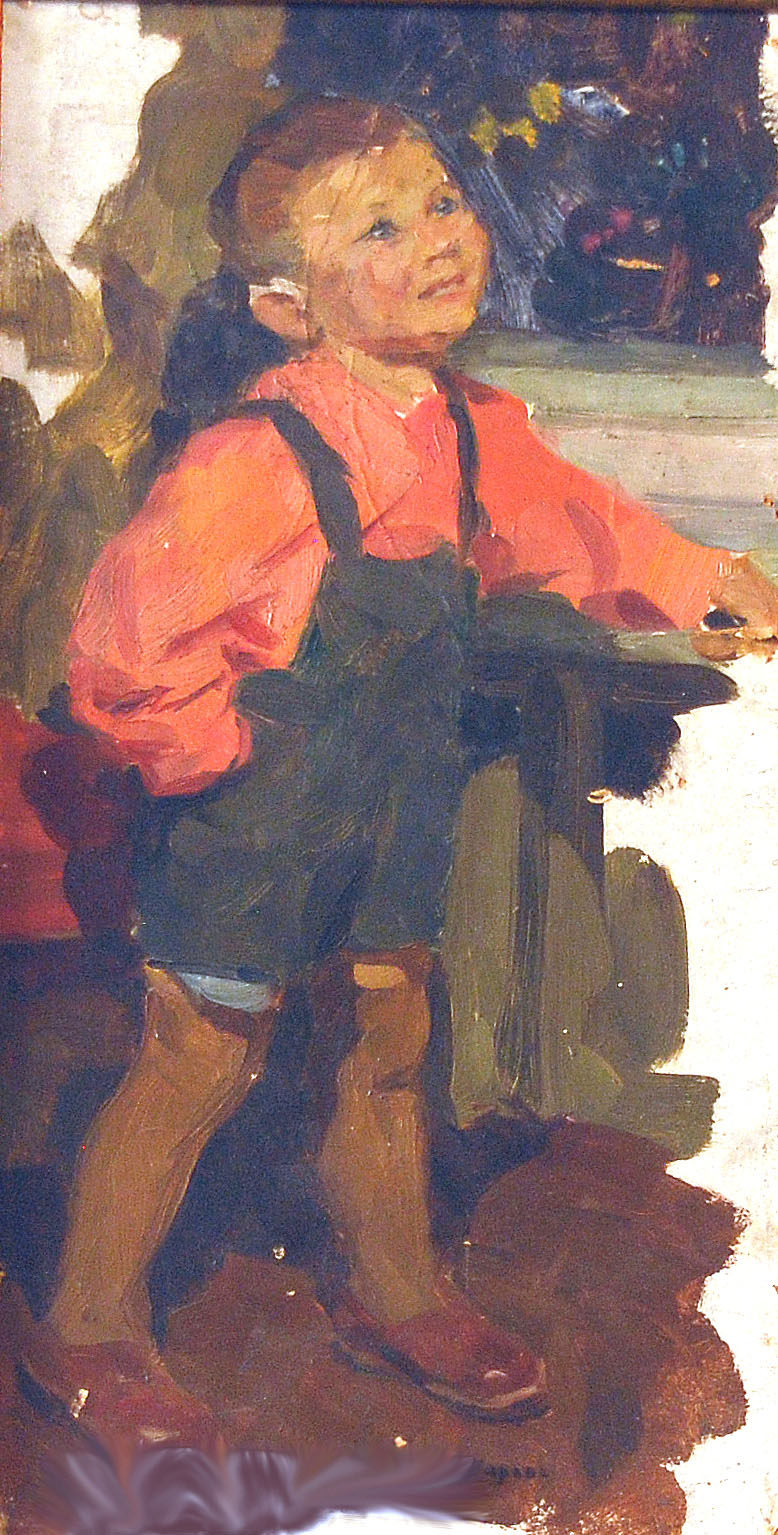
Yurochka is looking at Christmas tree. 1956
