= List of ships of the Compagnie Générale Transatlantique =

This list records vessels that served with the Compagnie Générale Transatlantique (French Line) at any point in their careers, including ships built for other owners and those later acquired, transferred, requisitioned, chartered, or awarded to CGT. The table documents each vessel’s original identity, builder, CGT‑related name, CGT service period, and ultimate fate.

It also includes vessels that served under CGT ownership, operation, or management while nominally belonging to associated entities such as Compagnie Générale d’Armements Maritimes (CGAM), Compagnie de Navigation Sud‑Atlantique, Compagnie Générale Transméditerranéenne (CGTM), Red Funnel, and Compagnie Canadienne Transatlantique, where CGT exercised direct managerial, operational, or commercial control.

This list is a working compilation and may be expanded or corrected as additional contemporary sources are located. The table is therefore maintained as a live document reflecting the best information presently available.

== Exclusions ==
This list records only a summary of periods of service under CGT ownership, operation, or management. Vessels whose careers lie entirely outside CGT auspices — including service solely under other owners, joint‑venture partners, subsidiary companies, or successor entities — are excluded.

Where a vessel served under CGT at any point in its career, only its CGT service is recorded here; earlier and later careers fall outside the scope of this list and are documented in the standard commercial sources noted below.

== Successor entity ==
In 1976 the Compagnie Générale Transatlantique was merged into the newly created Compagnie Générale Maritime (CGM), which became the legal successor to CGT. Middlemiss’s historical summary indicates that the transfer of CGT’s remaining fleet and subsidiaries into CGM was largely complete by 1979, with full integration achieved in 1980.

As this list records only periods of service under CGT ownership, operation, or management, vessels whose service lies solely under CGM or later successor entities are excluded. Where Middlemiss extends a vessel’s CGT service beyond 1979, the service period has been standardised to end in 1979 to avoid implying CGT’s continued operation after its practical absorption into CGM.

Name	Built	Range	Status	Vessel Type	Dims	GRT	Fate	Notes	Image
Abd el Kader	1880	1880-1922	Own	Abd el Kader type passenger/cargo vessel	310.2 ft. (bp) x 33.5 ft.	1,850	Broken up in May 1922	Built by John Elder.	—
Administrateur en Chef Thomas	1943	1945-1948	Mgr	Empire type cargo vessel	423.9 ft. (bp) x 56.2 ft.	7,049	Ran aground on Goodwin Sands as Santagata on 23 December 1950.	Built by Armstrong Whitworth as Empire Farmer for MOWT; acquired by the French Govt. in 1945 and R/n Administrateur en Chef Thomas (CGT as managers); transferred in 1948.	—
Afrique	1872	1880-1901	Own	Afrique-type passenger/cargo vessel	260.1 ft. (bp) x 29.8 ft.	1,227	Broken up in 1911.	Built by Scotts for Cie. Maritime Valery Frères & Fils; acquired by CGT on 7 December 1880; converted to cargo only and sold in 1901. (Note: One of several CGT vessels temporarily requisitioned in 1881 for the Tunisian campaign.)	—
Agadir	1952	1952-1955	Mgr	Safi type livestock and wine carrier	269 ft. (oa) x 39.4 ft.	1,165	Sank as Fenko near Cape Gata on 20 December 1974.	Built by Scheepswerf en Machinefabriek De Biesbosch for CGAM; transferred to subsidiary, Cie. Générale Marocaine d'Armements in 1955; sold in 1973. (Note: Middlemiss does not explicitly state, for this vessel, that she was managed by CGT during her CGAM period; the management period is inferred from Middlemiss p. 12, which states: “CGAM was formed with Chargeurs Réunis. CGT was a major shareholder and manager”.) (Note: Middlemiss lists vessels of Cie Générale Marocaine d’Armements (CGMA) as part of the wider CGT group; CGMA service is listed for context but never counted as CGT management or operational service unless Middlemiss is explicit.)	—
Ajaccio	1872	1881-1900	Own	Afrique-type passenger/cargo vessel	260.1 ft. (bp) x 29.8 ft.	1,228	Grounded on Lighthouse Rocks on 25 January 1900 whilst on charter to Cie. Frassinet; total loss.	Built by Scotts for Cie. Maritime Valery Frères & Fils; acquired by CGT on 7 December 1880.	—
Alabama	1931	1931-1940; 1946-1954	Own; Own	San Antonio type cargo vessel	425 ft. (bp) x 54.9 ft.	5,645	Broken up as Ocean Trader at Hong Kong in 1960.	Built by Chantiers et Ateliers de Saint‑Nazaire–Penhoët; sailed in Allied service 1940-1945; sold in 1954.	
Alaska	1922	1922-1939	Own	Alaska type cargo vessel	425 ft. (bp) x 55 ft.	5,399	Sank after a collision with Dotterel 12 miles SE of Owers Lightship on 15 November 1939.	Built by Sunderland Shipbuilding.	—
Alexandre Bixio	1880	1880-1905	Own	Abana type cargo vessel	298.2 ft. (bp) x 35.8 ft.	1,239	Stranded in fog in the English Channel on 21 January 1905.	Built by Pearse for J.M. Wood and acquired on the stocks by CGT and completed as Alexandre Bixio.	—
Alice	1872	1876-1905	Own	Cargo vessel	226.3 ft. (bp) x 30.8 ft.	860	Deleted from register in 1917.	Built by Stephens as Selica for F.J. Servais; acquired by CGT in 1876 and R/n Alice; sold in 1905.	—
Allier	1932	1932-1939; 1939-1940	Mgr; Own	Allier type livestock carrier	325.5 ft. (bp) x 52.5 ft.	4,087	Sunk by carrier based aircraft 10 miles NW of Maritima on 14 March 1943	Built by Ateliers et Chantiers de France for CGAM; rebuilt as a fruit carrier in 1935 and R/n Caraïbe; acquired by CGT in 1939; seized by Germans forces on 24 June 1940.	—
Amérique	1865	—	—	—	—	—	—	refer Impératrice Éugenie	—
Angoulême	1919	1940-1948	Mgr	EFC Design 1020 cargo vessel	251 ft. (bp) x 43.7 ft.	2,451	Broken up in 1954.	Built by Toledo Shipbuilding as Lake Filbert for the USSB' acquired by French Govt. as Nabesna in 1940 and R/n Angoulême, operated by Transports Maritimes, managed by CGAM; sold in 1948.	—
Anjou	1968	1968-1980	Own	Anjou type cargo vessel	494.2 ft. (oa) x 65.8 ft.	8,718	Arrived at Gadani Beach as Navigator Bay on 19 May 1986; for break up.	Built by VEB Warnowwerft Warnemünde; surplus by 1979; sold in 1980.	
Antilles	1913	1913-1937	Own	Passenger vessel	281.9 ft. (bp) x 38.5 ft.	2,073	Broken up in 1937.	Built by Chantiers et Ateliers de Saint‑Nazaire–Penhoët. (Note: In French maritime usage, paquebot is a broad term meaning any scheduled‑route passenger ship, including colonial steamers, Mediterranean packets, and mixed passenger/cargo vessels. Machine translation tools (e.g., Google Translate) often render paquebot as “ocean liner”, but this is misleading: the French term does not imply ocean‑liner architecture or long‑distance oceanic service. This article therefore classifies ships using English‑language maritime categories (passenger vessel, passenger/cargo vessel, cargo vessel, ocean liner) based on documented service, tonnage, and construction, rather than the French usage of paquebot.)	—
Antilles	1953	1953-1971	Own	Flandre type ocean liner	598.7 ft. (oa) x 80.3 ft.	19,828	Struck rocks off Mustique on 8 January 1971.	Built by Arsenal de Brest	
Aquitaine	1890	1899-1906	Own	Ocean liner	500 ft. (bp) x 57.5 ft.	8,242	Broken up at Bo' ness in 1906.	Built by Fairfields as Normannia for HAPAG; arrested by French Govt. as Patriota in July 1899 and passed onto CGT and R/n Aquitaine.	
Arcadie	—	—	—	—	—	—	—	refer Basse-Terre	—
Ardèche	1890	1915-1925	Own	Passenger/cargo vessel	314.5 ft. (bp) x 42.2 ft.	2,716	Broken up in 1925.	Built by Hawthorn, Leslie as Gulf of Ancud for Greenock Shipping; acquired by CGT as General Lyautey in 1915 and R/n Ardèche.	—
Ardèche	1932	1932-1935; 1935-1939; 1939-1954	Mgr; Mgr; Own	Allier type livestock carrier	325.5 ft. (bp) x 52.5 ft	4,087	Broken up in 1954.	Built by Ateliers et Chantiers de France for CGAM; rebuilt as fruit carrier Marigot in 1935; acquired by CGT in 1939.	—
Ardennes	1920	1935-1938	Own	Nelly Lasry type cargo vessel	300.7 ft. (bp) x 43.7 ft.	2,275	Broken up as Cap El Hank in Hong Kong in 1963.	Built by Burntisland Shipbuilding as Nelly Lasry for J. Lasry; acquired by CGT as Ardennes in 1935; sold in 1938; taken over by MOWT in 1940. (Note: Middlemiss records a return to CGT in 1945, a registration in 1950 and a sale in 1958; however, Lloyd’s Registers list the vessel under Société Anonyme de Gérance et d’Armement to at least 1951, and the vessel cannot be located in Lloyd’s after 1952–1953 under either name. In this instance, as the post‑1938 ownership and service history cannot be reconciled with Lloyd’s, no additional CGT service period has been included.)	—
Argentan	1943	1946-1956	Mgr	EC-2-S-C1 (Liberty) type cargo vessel	441.6 ft. (oa), 422.8 ft. (bp) x 57 ft.	7,176	Broken up in 1973.	Built by Oregon Shipbuilding as Gabriel Franchere for the USWSA; acquired by the French Govt. on 26 May 1946 and R/n Argentan (CTG as managers); transferred to Soc. Navale Delmas in 1956.	—
Arica	1921	1921-1934; 1934-1942	Opr; Own	Alaska type cargo vessel	425 ft. x (bp) 54.8 ft.	5,390	Torpedoed by U-160 8 miles from Galera Point on 6 November 1942.	Built by Sunderland Shipbuilding as Zenon for Cie. de Navigation d'Orbigny; bareboat chartered to CGT in 1921 and R/n Arica; acquired by CGT in February 1934; seized from Vichy France by the MOWT in 1942. (Note: Middlemiss infers a Vichy France takeover but does not provide dates, CGT ownership has therefore been taken to 1942 where the vessel is taken over by MOWT.)	—
Ariège	1920	1935-1938	Own	Nelly Lasry type cargo vessel	300.7 ft. (bp) x 43.7 ft.	2,275	Broken up Kahraman Dragon in 1976.	Built by Burntisland Shipbuilding as Sydney Lasry for J.Lasry; acquired by CGT as Ariège in 1935; sold in 1938.	—
Arizona	1925	1928-1942	Own	Alaska type cargo vessel	425 ft. (bp) x 55 ft.	5,398	Sunk by Allied bombing at Palermo on 17 April 1944.	Built by Sunderland Shipbuilding as Arizona for Harlem Steam Ship; acquired by CGT in 1928; captured by German forces at Marseilles on 1 December 1942.	
Arkansas	1899	1919-1921; 1921-1934	Opr; Own	Passenger/cargo vessel	450 ft. (bp) x 53.3 ft.	6,550	Sold in October 1934; broken up in Italy.	Built by Workman Clark as Brisgravia for HAPAG; ceded to France on 30 March 1919, operated by CGT; acquired by CGT in 1921 and R/n Arkansas.	—
Athléte	1890	1894-1936	Own	Tug	147.4 ft. (bp) x 22.8 ft.	247	Broken up in 1936.	Built by Canada Works for Canada Works; acquired by CGT in 1894.	—
Atlantic Champagne	1969	1969-1979	Own	Atlantic Causeway type container vessel	695.7 ft. (oa) x 646 ft (bp) x 92 ft.	15,351	Arrived in Santander on 14 March 1985; for break up	Built by Chantiers de l'Atlantique; transferred to CGM in 1979.	—
Atlantic Cognac	1970	1970-1979	Own	Atlantic Causeway type container vessel	695.7 ft. (oa) x 646 ft (bp) x 92 ft.	15,351	Arrived in Santander on 14 March 1985; for break up.	Built by Chantiers Navale de la Ciotat; transferred to CGM in 1979.	—
Atlantique	1865	—	—	—	—	—	—	refer Impératrice Éugenie	—
Atlas	1949	1949-1953; 1953-1968	Mgr; Own	Atlas type bulk wine carrier	313 ft. (oa) x 46 ft.	2,035	Broken up as Dona Helena in 1989.	Built by Ateliers and Chantiers de Provence for CGAM (CGT as managers); transferred to CGT in 1953; sold in 1968.	—
Aube	1896	1917-1922; 1923-1926	Own; Opr	Cargo vessel	245 ft. (bp) x 41 ft.	1,580	Broken up in 1926.	Built by Wood, Skinner as Rosemount for Montreal Transportation; acquired by CGT in 1917 and R/n Aube.; sold in 1922; acquired as Rosemount by Aube Shipping in 1923 and R/n Aube, chartered to CGT.	—
Aunis	1971	1971-1980	Own	Anjou type cargo vessel	494.4 ft. (oa) x 65.8 ft.	8,718	Arrived at Gadani Beach as Delfini on 16 December 1985; for break up.	Built by VEB Warnowwerft Warnemünde; sold in 1980.	—
Auray	1943	1947-1949	Mgr	EC-2-S-C1 (Liberty) type cargo vessel	441.6 ft. (oa), 422.8 ft. (bp) x 57 ft.	7,176	Broken up in Spain as Ardina in 1971.	Built by Permanente Metals as Uriah M. Rose for the USWSA; acquired by the French Govt. in 1947 and R/n Auray (CGT as managers); transferred to Cie. des Messageries Maritimes on 3 September 1949.	—
Aures	1950	—	—	—	—	—	—	refer Sahara	—
Auvergne	1968	1968–1979	Own	Anjou type cargo vessel	494.4 ft. (oa) x 65.8 ft.	8,718	Arrived in Alang as Panaghia on 2 February 1987; for break up.	Built by VEB Warnowwerft Warnemünde; sold in 1979.	
Avranches	1943	1946-1954	Mgr	EC-2-S-C1 (Liberty) type cargo vessel	441.6 ft. (oa), 422.8 ft. (bp) x 57 ft.	7,176	Broken up at Split as Avranchoise in April 1970.	Built by Permanente Metals as Tecumsah for the USWSA; acquired by French Govt on 26 May 1946 and R/n Avranches (CGT as managers); transferred to Soc. Navale Caennaise in 1954.	—
Avreyon	1923	1939-1941	Own	Cargo vessel	362.9 ft. (bp) x 49.2 ft.	4,785	Sunk as Petrella by Allied air attack in Suda Bay on 8 February 1944.	Built by Forges et Chantiers de la Gironde as Pasteur for Cie. Chargeurs de Francais; acquired by CGT in 1939 and R/n Avreyon; handed over to Italy on 10 July 1941.	—
Azemmour	1909	1913-1918	Own	Coaster cargo vessel	205 ft. (bp) x 33 ft.	928	Torpedoed by SM UB-59 SW of the Needles on 3 March 1918.	Built by Short Brothers as Wistaria for Mower, Cotterell; acquired by CGT in 1913 and R/n Azemmour.	—
Balata	1892	1921-1925	Own	Wear type cargo vessel	120 ft. (bp) x 21.1 ft.	180	Sold and broken up in March 1925.	Built by J. MacArthur as Wear for Royal Mail Steam Packet; acquired by CGT in 1921 and R/n Balata.	—
Balata	1922	1928-1951	Own	Cargo vessel	121 ft. (bp) x 23.2 ft.	312	Broken up in 1951.	Built by Botje Ensing as Hoffnung for Seesschiffahrts; acquired by CGT in 1928 and R/n Balata.	—
Baltique	1952	1956-1959	Own	Cargo vessel	259.1 ft. (bp) x 39.3 ft.	1,317	Broken up as Ithaki in 1975.	Built by Anciens Chantiers Dubigeon as Francoise Le Brise for Cie. Francois Le Brise; acquired by CGT in 1956 and R/n Baltique; sold in 1959.	—
Barfleur	1938	1939-1939; 1947-1955	Mgr; Own	Fruit carrier	320.2 ft. (bp) x 45.6 ft.	3,259	Caught fire at Thessalonika as Victora Elena on 16 January 1967.	Built by Burmeister & Wain for CGAM; acquired by CGT in 1939; requisitioned by French Govt. and British Govt. (1939-1946); reverted to CGT in 1947; sold in 1955.	—
Barracuda	1971	1971-1979	Own	Tug	121.9 ft. (oa) x 30.9 ft	356	Still in service as of 2006.	Built by Soc. des Ateliers Francaise de l'Ouest; transferred to CGM in 1979.	—
Basse-Terre	1909	1909-1934	Own	Basse Terre type cargo vessel	316.2 ft. (bp) x 44 ft.	3,108	Broken up at Ghent in 1934.	Built by Ateliers and Chantiers de Provence; R/n Arcadie in 1933.	—
Basse-Terre	1930	1933-1937	Mgr	Cargo vessel	253 ft. (bp) x 30.2 ft.	1,555	Wrecked as Beato Vincenzo at Liceta on 3 June 1967; broken up in June 1968.	Built by Nakskov Skibsværft as Else for Vesterhavet; acquired by CGAM on 27 December 1933 and R/n Basse-Terre; sold on 23 October 1937.	—
Bastia	1872	1880-1900	Own	Afrique-type passenger/cargo vessel	260.5 ft. (bp) x 29.8 ft.	1,227	Wrecked at Cape Carbon on 17 April 1900.	Built by Scotts for Cie. Maritime Valery Frères & Fils; acquired by CGT on 7 December 1880.	—
Bayeaux	1944	1946-1965	Mgr	EC-2-S-C1 (Liberty) type cargo vessel	441.6 ft. (oa), 422.8 ft. (bp) x 57 ft.	7,176	Broken up at Castellon as Sinoe in April 1969.	Built by Permanente Metals as Mello Franco for the USWSA; acquired by the French Govt. on 26 May 1946 and R/n Bayeaux (CGT as managers); sold 1965.	—
Beauvais	1943	1947-1950	Mgr	EC-2-S-C1 (Liberty) type cargo vessel	441.6 ft. (oa), 422.8 ft. (bp) x 57 ft.	7,176	Broken up as Jules Verne at Castellon in May 1967.	Built by North Carolina Shipbuilding as John Lawson for the USWSA; acquired by the French Govt. in 1947 and R/n Beauvais (CGT as managers); transferred to Cie. des Messageries Maritimes on 4 March 1950.	—
Belain d'Esnambuc	1940	1940-1942	Mgr	Produce and fruit carrier	334 ft. (oa), 321.8 ft (bp) x 46.2 ft.	2,956	Sunk off San Remo as Pommern after hitting Italian mine on 5 October 1943.	Built by Framnæs Mekaniske Værksted for the French Govt. (CGT as managers); seized by the Germans on 16 December 1942.	—
Bernard	1928	1929-1952	Own	Tug	52.6 ft. (bp) x 14.9 ft.	41	Sank whilst in tow to Fort de France in 1952.	Built by Ateliers Lozai as Bernard; acquired by CGT in 1929.	—
Bernieres	1942	1947-1951	Mgr	EC-2-S-C1 (Liberty) type cargo vessel	441.6 ft. (oa), 422.8 ft. (bp) x 57 ft.	7,176	Wrecked at the Vridi Canal jetty on 21 April 1963.	Built by Willamette Iron & Steel as John Harvard for the USWSA; acquired by the French Govt. in 1947 and R/n Bernieres (CGT as managers); transferred to Soc. Navales Delmas in 1951.	—
Biarritz	1891	—	—	—	—	—	—	refer Général Chanzy	—
Biskra	1915	1916-1933	Own	Passenger/cargo vessel	260 ft. (bp) x 40.2 ft.	2,413	Broken up in August 1933.	Built by W. Harkness as Asia for National Steam Navigation; acquired by CGT in 1916 and R/n Biskra.	—
Bonifacio	1918	1939-1942	Own	Cargo vessel	356.3 ft. (bp) x 48.7 ft.	3,566	Sunk as Campobasso E of Kelibia Island by HMS Nubian on 4 May 1943.	Built by J. Blumer as Wulsty Castle for J. Blumer; acquired by CGT as Bonifacio in September 1939; seized at Marseille by Germans on 3 December 1942.	—
Bordeaux	1890	1899-1915	Own	Cargo Vessel	370.2 ft. (bp) x 46.4 ft.	4,530	Torpedoed by SM U-20 in the Bay of Biscay on 7 September 1915.	Built by Robert Stephenson as Francisco for Thomas Wilson; acquired by CGT in 1899 and R/n Bordeaux.	—
Borodine	1971			RoRO car carrier	347.8 ft. (oa) x 57.5 ft.	2,656	Still in service as Borodine as of Sept. 2006.	Built by ACH for Cie. Generale Transbaltique; transferred to CGM in 1988. (Note: Middlemiss’s French Lines historical summary describes the 1976 merger of CGT into CGM but does not provide a specific legal end-date for CGT. He continues to treat certain vessels and subsidiaries as operating under CGT auspices into the late 1970s, while indicating that the transfer of CGT’s remaining fleet and subsidiaries into CGM was largely complete by 1979, with full integration achieved in 1980. For the purposes of this table, where Middlemiss extends a vessel’s service period under CGT beyond 1979, the service period has been standardised to end in 1979 to avoid implying CGT’s continued operation beyond the point at which Middlemiss shows its practical absorption into CGM.)	—
Bou-Regreg	1909	1913-1919	Own	Coaster	132.3 ft. (bp) x 23.1 ft.	353	Wrecked in 1919.	Built by Gourlay Brothers as Myrtle Bank for D & J Nicol; acquired by CGT in 1913 and R/n Bou-Regreg.	—
Bresle	1945	1946-1964	Own	C1-M-AVI type cargo vessel	323.9 ft. (bp) x 50.1 ft.	3,807	Deleted from Lloyd's register as Arimar in 1974.	Built by Southeastern Shipbuilding as Marline Bend for the USWSA; acquired by the French Govt. in 1946, allocated to CGT and R/n Bresle; sold in 1964.	—
Brest	1942	1947-1949	Mgr	EC-2-S-C1 (Liberty) type cargo vessel	441.6 ft. (oa), 422.8 ft. (bp) x 57 ft.	7,181	Broken up as Elios in 1971.	Built by Permanente Metals as John McLean for the USWSA; acquired by the French Govt. in 1947 and R/n Brest (CGT as managers); transferred to Cie. des Messageries Maritimes on 21 July 1949.	—
Bretagne	1922	1936-1939	Own	Flandria type ocean liner	450.1 ft. (bp) x 59.2 ft.	10,171	Torpedoed off Land's End by U 45 on 14 October 1939.	Built by Barclay Curle as Flandria for KHL; acquired by CGT in May 1936 and R/n Bretagne	
Cacique	1856	1865-1881	Own	Passenger/cargo vessel	187 ft. (bp) x 26.2 ft.	802	Sold for break up in 1881.	Built by Robert Napier and Sons as Rouen but acquired on completion by CGM and R/n Seine-et-Rhone; transferred to CGT in November 1865 and R/n Cacique. (Note: Ships built for CGT’s predecessor, the original Compagnie Générale Maritime (CGM), formed in 1855 by the Péreire brothers, are included in this list only from the date they entered CGT service. Their earlier careers under CGM are not counted as CGT service.)	—
Cacique	1908	1908-1917	Own	Cacique type cargo vessel	325 ft. (bp) x 43.7 ft.	2,896	Sunk at Bay of Biscay by SM U‑21 on 20 February 1917.	Built by Swan Hunter & Wigham Richardson.	—
Caldera	1868	1878-1886	Own	Passenger/cargo vessel	282.2 ft. (bp) x 34.3 ft.	1,741	Sank off Suakin in May 1887.	Built by Denny as Assam (speculative build); acquired by CGT as Caldera in December 1878; laid up in 1883; sold in 1886.	—
Caledonien	1940	1940-1942	Mgr	Steamship	469.3 ft. x 61.6 ft.	7,960	Destroyed at Bizerta by allied aircraft as Spoletto on 27 January 1943.	Built by Soc.Provençale de Constructions Navales for the French Govt. (CGT a managers); taken over by Germans in November 1942.	—
Californie	1905	1905-1934	Own	Louisiane type passenger/cargo vessel	344.64 ft. (bp) x 47.24 ft.	5,152	Broken up in 1934.	Built by Ateliers et Chantiers de France; chartered to Cie. Canadienne Tranatlantique in April 1919 (company was a JV between CGT and Canada Steamship Lines).	—
Cambronne	1919	1937-1939; 1939-1940	Own; Mgr	Cambronne type Cargo vessel	331.4 ft. x 46.7 ft.	3,059	Damaged in air attack at Hamburg in March 1945; refloated, beached; salvaged in October 1950 and broken up.	Built by Greenock and Grangemouth Dockyard, launched as War Horizon, completed as Cambronne, for Soc. Anon Chargeurs L'Ouest; acquired by CGT in 1937; transferred to CGAM in March 1939; seized by German forces in July 1940.	—
Canada	1866	—	—	—	—	—	—	refer Panama	
Canche	1945	1946-1955	Mgr	C1-M-AVI type cargo vessel	323.9 ft. (bp) x 50.1 ft.	3,807	Deleted from Lloyd's register as Arimar in 1974.	Built by Southeastern Shipbuilding as Persian Knot for the USWSA; acquired by the French Govt. in 1946 (CGT as managers) and R/n Canche; sold in 1955.	—
Cantal	1916	1917-1950	Own	Screw steamer	305 ft. (bp) x 43.7 ft.	3,188	Broken up in 1950.	Built by Osaka Iron Works as Unkai Maru No.6 for Nakamura Goshi; acquired by CGT in 1917 and R/n Cantal.	—
Capitaine Coullon	1918	1920-1936	Own	Screw steamer	220 ft. (bp) x 35.1 ft.	1,325	Sold and broken up in 1936.	Built by Nova Scotia Steel and Coal as War Wasp for Shipping Controller; acquired by CGT as Capitane Coullon in May 1920.	—
Capitaine Winckler	1922	1922-1924	Own	Cargo vessel	270.3 ft. (bp) x 39.5 ft.	2,018	Wrecked enroute Halifax-Loch Ewe on 9 February 1941.	Built by Anciens Chantiers Dubigeon for Soc. Anon Chargeurs de l'Ouest; transferred to CGT in 1922; exchanged for Caracoli in 1924 and reverted to original owners.	—
Cap Pinède	1938	1939-1940	Mgr	Cargo vessel	251.2 ft. (bp) x 42.3 ft.	1,320	Broken up as Aglaia in 1969.	Built by FMV as Brush for AS Bestum and then acquired by Cie. France Navigation and renamed Cap Pinède; taken over by CGT in September 1939; entered wartime service in 1940; returned to Cie. France Navigation in 1946; later transferred to Cie Générale Marocaine d’Armements and renamed Medhia; sold in 1955. (Note: Middlemiss notes that vessels of Cie France Navigation (CFN) were “taken over by CGT” at the outbreak of war in 1939 and, in some cases, “returned to CFN” after 1946, but he does not explain the nature or extent of CGT’s involvement. For consistency, all CFN service outside wartime is deemed CGT management (Mgr), and all wartime service is treated as Government service rather than CGT operation.) (Note: Middlemiss frequently describes vessels entering wartime Government service, but he does not explain CGT’s capacity, role, or operational involvement during the war. To maintain consistency, all wartime service—whether under French, British, Allied, Vichy, or Free French control—is treated as Government service rather than CGT management or CGT operation. Only CGT service explicitly stated by Middlemiss is counted.)	
Caracoli	1903	1924-1928	Own	Cargo vessel	390.5 ft. x 50 ft.	4,838	Destroyed by fire at Pointe-a-Pitre in 1928.	Built by ACL as Abriez-Izel for La Federation Maritime de Bretagne; acquired by CGT in part exchange for Capitaine Winckler in 1924 and R/n Caracoli.	—
Caraïbe	1856	1864-1882	Own	Passenger/cargo vessel	204 ft. (bp) x 27.2 ft.	605	Sold in 1882; for break up.	Built by Denny as Marie Stuart for Cie. Générale Maritime; acquired by CGT in 1864 and R/n Caraïbe.	—
Caraïbe	1906	1908-1934	Own	Cargo vessel	331.8 ft. x (bp) 43.2 ft.	2,847	Wrecked as Ha-Yin in 1939.	Built by Gourlay Brothers as Registan for Anglo American; acquired by CGT in 1908 and R/n Caraïbe; sold in 1934.	—
Caraïbe	1932	—	—	—	—	—	—	refer Allier	—
Caraïbe	1949	1949-1951; 1951-1972	Mgr; Own	Caraïbe type cargo vessel	423.2 ft. (bp) x 59.9 ft.	5,738	Arrived in Zeebrugge on 18 April 1972; for break up at Bruges.	Built by N.V.C. van der Giessen & Zonen's Scheepswerven for the French Govt. (CGT as managers). (Note: Lloyd’s Register (1949–50, 1951–52) records Caraïbe as delivered under French Government ownership with CGT as managers, but shows a transition to CGT ownership by 1951–52. Middlemiss notes Government ownership only for Caraïbe and provides no such wording for the sister ships Carbet and Carimaire. Lloyd’s records both of these vessels as CGT-owned from completion. Accordingly, Caraïbe is treated as initially Government-owned and later CGT-owned, while Carbet and Carimaire are treated as CGT vessels throughout.)	—
Caravelle	1855	1865-1885	Own	Passenger/cargo vessel	200 ft. (bp) x 29 ft.	716	Foundered at sea as Era in 1908.	Built by Samuda Brothers as Danube for Cie. Générale Maritime; taken over by CGT in 1865 and R/n Caravelle; sold in 1885.	—
Caravelle	1904	1908-1927	Own	Passenger/cargo vessel	293.8 ft. (bp) x 40.3 ft.	2,531	Broken up in the Netherlands in 1927.	Built by Hall, Russell as Dora for Unione Austriaca di Nav.; acquired by CGT in 1908.	—
Caravelle	1933	1933-1938	Mgr	Cargo vessel	258.2 ft. (bp) x 39.7 ft.	1,370	Destroyed by fire as Micheal on 12 October 1968; broken up in May 1969.	Built by Helsingør Skibsværft og Maskinbyggeri as Helga III for Vesterhavet; acquired by CGAM on 10 October 1933 and R/n Caravelle; sold on 23 November 1938.	—
Carbet	1920	1920-1943	Own	Carbet type cargo vessel	365 ft. (bp) x 49 ft.	3,687	Sunk off Piombinmo in April 1943.	Built by Napier and Miller; seized by German forces on 11 January 1943.	—
Carbet	1949	1949-1971	Own	Caraïbe type cargo vessel	423.2 ft. (bp) x 59.9 ft.	5,738	Broken up as Arbet from 4 May 1972.	Built by KMS; withdrawn and laid up at Brest on 11 December 1971.	—
Carimaré	1920	—	—	—	—	—	—	refer Saint-Aygulf	
Carimaré	1949	1949-1972	Own	Caraïbe type cargo vessel	423.2 ft. (bp) x 59.9 ft.	5,738	Arrived at Barcelona as Asona in 1980; for break up.	Built by KMS; sold in 1972.	—
Caroline	1908	1908-1934	Own	Floride type passenger/cargo vessel	410.5 ft. (bp) x 52.3 ft.	6,698	Laid up in 1931; broken up in 1934.	Built by Ateliers and Chantiers de Provence; Rn Jacques-Cartier in 1929.	—
Carthage	1910	1910-1914	Own	Carthage type passenger/cargo vessel	403 ft. (oa) x 51.3 ft.	5,601	Torpedoed by SM U-21 2 miles E of Cape Helles on 4 July 1915.	Built by Swan Hunter & Wigham Richardson; requisitioned by the French Govt. in 1914;	—
Cassidaigne	1923	1939-1940	Mgr	Cargo vessel	244.4 ft. (bp) x 36.4 ft.	1,544	Mined off San Peitro Sardinia on 13 September 1940.	Built by Germaniawerft as Zeeland for Scheepvaart en Steenkolen Maats.; taken over from Cie. France Navigation as Cassidaigne in 1939	—
Cavalier de la Salle	1949	1949-1968	Own	Cavalier de la Salle type cargo vessel	466.6 ft. (bp) x 61.8 ft.	6,916	Arrived for break up as Cavalier of Athens on 18 June 1971.	Built by Forges et Chantiers de la Gironde; sold in 1968.	—
Champlain	1932	1932-1940	Own	Ocean liner	606.9 ft. (bp) x 82.9 ft.	28,124	Sunk by a magnetic mine near La Pallice on 17 June 1940; wreck dismantled in 1963-64.	Built by Chantiers et Ateliers de Saint‑Nazaire–Penhoët.	
Champlain	1974	1974-1977	Own	Ore-bulk-oil carrier	856.4 ft. (bp) x 133 ft.	68,705	Arrived at Alang as Aegiali on 26 April 1996; for break up.	Built by Mitsubishi Heavy Industries; transferred to CGM on 1 March 1977.	—
Charles-Plumier	1938	1938-1940; 1945-1948; 1948-1964	Mgr; Mgr; Own	Banana carrier	358.6 ft. (bp) x 51.8 ft.	4,504	Arrived at Vado as Plias on 9 May 1968; for break up.	Built by Ateliers and Chantiers de Provence for CGAM (CGT as managers); taken over by the MOWT in June 1940 and rebuilt as HMS Largs in 1942; returned in November 1945; acquired by CGT in 1948; sold in 1964.	
Charles Quint	1880	1880-1888	Own	Passenger/cargo vessel	324.8 ft. (bp) x 33.63 ft.	1,562	Collided with Ville de Brest and sank off Kerkenna reefs on 8 July 1888.	Built by A. & J. Inglis.	—
Charles Roux	1908	1908-1914; 1919-1936	Own; Own	Passenger/cargo vessel	385.5 ft. (bp) x 45.6 ft.	4,104	Broken up at Dunkirk in October 1936.	Built by Chantiers et Ateliers de Saint‑Nazaire–Penhoët; requisitioned by the French Govt on 4 December 1914, serving intermittently as a troop ship and hospital ship; returned in 1919.	
Chef Méchanicien Durand	1946	1946-1949	Mgr	Type D (Empire) cargo Vessel	449 ft. (oa), 431.2 ft. (bp) x 56.3 ft.	5,048	Wrecked as Aeokas in September 1965.	Built by the Shipbuilding Corporation, laid down as Empire Stronsay, launched as Louis E. Durand and completed as Chef Méchanicien Durand for the French Govt. (CGT as managers); to Cie. Maritime Normande in 1949.	—
Chéliff	1940	1946-1948	Mgr	Cargo vessel	199.6 ft. (bp) x 32 ft.	798	Broken up as Wine Trader in 1972.	Built by Kaldnes Mekaniske Verksted as Myken for Simonsen & Astrup; acquired by CGAM in 1946 and R/n Chéliff (CGT as managers); sold in 1948.	—
Cherbourg	1943	1947-1954	Opr	EC-2-S-C1 (Liberty) type cargo vessel	441.6 ft. (oa), 422.8 ft. (bp) x 57 ft.	7,176	Broken up at Whampoa as Dimitrios in 1969.	Built by Todd Houston Shipbuilding as Moses Austin for the USWSA; acquired by the French Govt. in 1947 and R/n Cherbourg (CGT as operators); sold in 1954.	—
Chicago	1908	1908-1936	Own	Ocean liner	508.4 ft. (bp) x 57.8 ft.	11,127	Broken up at St. Nazaire in October 1936.	Built by Chantiers et Ateliers de Saint‑Nazaire–Penhoët as Chicago; R/n Guadeloupe in 1929.	—
Chicago	1959	1959-1976	Own	Chicago type cargo vessel	450 ft. (oa) x 62.4 ft.	8,166	At Kaoshing as Eurospirit on 7 July 1980; for break up.	Built by Ateliers and Chantiers de Provence; sold in 1976.	—
Chili	1950	1950-1967	Mgr	Chili type passenger/cargo vessel	475.8 ft. (oa) x 61.5 ft.	6,919	Broken up as Golden Tower in 1981.	Built by Burmeister & Wain for the Ministére des Travaux Publics et Transports (Managed by CGT); sold in 1967.	—
Chimère	1908	1919-????	Own	Viking type whaler	95.7 ft. (bp) x 18.9 ft.	125		Built by Kaldnes Mekaniske Verksted as Viking for no:Tønsbergs Hvalfangeri; acquired by CGT, for towing purposes, in 1919 and R/n Chimère. (Note: Middlemiss notes that the vessel disappearing from registers in 1929/1930; however, the editor has located entries for this vessel in Lloyd's registers in years following with the search not continuing due to fragmented digitisation.)	—
Clapeyron	1877	1880-1886	Own	Cargo vessel	263.4 ft.(bp) x 34.5 ft.	1,758	Broken up as Lydia in 1926.	Built by Short Brothers as Cotherstone for J.S.Barwick; acquired by CGT in 1880 and R/n Clapeyron; sold in 1886.	—
Cleveland	1960	1960-1977	Own	Chicago type cargo vessel	450 ft. (oa) x 62.4 ft.	8,141	Sank East of Bermuda as Despina H. on 23 February 1979.	Built by Ateliers and Chantiers de Provence; sold in 1977.	—
Colomba	1865	1880-1907	Own	Cargo vessel	199.3 ft. (bp) x 26.8 ft.	836	Went aground and caught fire near Audierne on 7 March 1907; total loss.	Built by Chantiers de l'Atlantique for Cie. Maritime Valery Frères & Fils; acquired by CGT on 7 December 1880.	—
Colombie	1862	—	—	—	—	—	—	refer Floride	—
Colombie	1931	1931-1939; 1946-1964	Own; Own	Ocean liner	488 ft. (bp) x 66.6 ft.	12,348	Sold as Atlantica in 1970; hulk towed to Barcelona in May 1974; for break up.	Built by Ateliers et Chantiers de France; requisitioned (1939-1946); returned to CGT as Aleda on 11 April 1946 and R/n Colombie; sold in 1964.	
Commandant Milliasseau	1953	1953-1965	Own	Cargo vessel	208.9 ft. (oa) x 32 ft.	586	Broken up as Good Year in 1990.	Built by G. Renck Jr. K.G.; sold in January 1965.	—
Commandant-Quéré	1948	1948-1968	Opr	Passenger/cargo vessel	363 ft. (oa), 344.7 ft. (bp) x 50.2 ft.	4,478	Broken up in 1968.	Built by John I. Thornycroft for the French Govt. (Note: Vessel launched for the French Government for the Marseille-Corsica route; operated by CGT under contract; the source does not make clear when this contract was awarded /terminated)	—
Comte-de Nice	1966	1966-1969; 1969-1976	Own; Mgr	Corse type ferry	377.3 ft. (oa) x 59.5 ft.	4,555	Demolition commenced as Express Naias on 17 April 2003.	Built by Ateliers and Chantiers de Provence, launched as Provence, completed as Comte de Nice; transferred to CGTM in 1969; transferred to SNCM in 1976. (Note: Middlemiss p.16 notes that Cie. Générale Transméditerranéenne (CGTM) was formed in 1969, consolidating the CGT and Navigation Mixte North Africa and Corsica ferry services. The vessels were transferred to CGTM, with CGT remaining as managers.)	
Corse	1966	1966-1969; 1969-1976	Onw; Mgr	Corse type ferry	377.3 ft. (oa) x 59.5 ft.	4,455	Stranded in gales at Port Aslep as Golden Vergina; vessel broke up.	Built by Chantiers de l'Atlantique; transferred to CGTM in 1969; transferred to SNCM in 1976.	
Courseulles	1944	1947-1948	Mgr	EC-2-S-C1 (Liberty) type cargo vessel	441.6 ft. (oa), 422.8 ft. (bp) x 57 ft.	7,176	Broken up as Hamburg in April 1964.	Built by Permanente Metals as Willet M. Hays for the USWSA; acquired by French Govt. in 1947 and R/n Courselles (CGT as managers); transferred Soc. Maritime Nationale on 18 July 1948.	
Coutances	1944	1947-1954	Mgr	EC-2-S-C1 (Liberty) type cargo vessel	441.6 ft. (oa), 422.8 ft. (bp) x 57 ft.	7,176	Broken up at Kaohsing as Mariblanca in April 1969.	Built by Todd Houston Shipbuilding as Katherine L. Bates for the USWSA; acquired by the French Govt. in 1947 and R/n Coutances (CGT as managers); sold in 1954.	
Cuba	1923	1923-1940	Own	Passenger/cargo vessel	476 ft. (bp) x 62.3 ft.	11,337	Torpedoed by U1195 off Bembridge on 6 April 1945.	Built by Swan, Hunter & Wigham Richardson; seized by British forces on 31 October 1940 and then taken over by MOWT.	
Cyrnos	1929	1948-1966	Own	Passenger/cargo vessel	293.4 ft. (bp) x 41.1 ft.	2,406	Broken up as Split in 1966.	Built by AG Weser for Cie Frassinet; acquired by CGT on 1 May 1948.	—
Darien	1866	1866-1870	Own	Passenger/cargo vessel	222 ft. (bp) x 28.9 ft.	909	Stranded at the mouth of the Mississippi estuary in 1870.	Built by Pile, Spence.	
De Grasse	1924	1924-1940; 1942-1945; 1945-1953	Own; Opr; Own	Ocean liner	552.1 ft. (bp) x 71.4 ft.	17,759	Went aground on rocks outside Cannes as Empress of Australia on 17 March 1962; beached; sold in August 1962; broken up.	Built by Cammell Laird, laid down as Suffren, completed as De Grasse; seized by German forces in July 1940; returned to Vichy France in June 1942 (Operated by CGT); scuttled at Bordeaux on 25 August 1944; raised and returned to CGT in September 1945; sold on 26 March 1953.	
De Grasse	1956	1971-1973	Own	Ocean liner	578.2 ft. (oa), 518 ft. (bp) x 72.1 ft.	18,739	Destroyed by fire as Rasa Sayang on 27 August 1980; towed to Kynosoura and sank.	Built by Swan Hunter and Wigham Richardson as Bergensfjord for the Norwegian America Line; acquired by CGT in 1971 and R/n De Grasse; sold in October 1973.	
De La Salle	1921	1921-1940	Own	Passenger/ cargo vessel	440 ft. (bp) x 56.7 ft	8,400	Torpedoed by U-508 in Gulf of Benin on 9 July 1943.	Built by Barclay Curle; came under Allied control in June 1940.	
Désirade	1869	1871-1906	Own	Passenger/cargo vessel	268 ft. (bp) x 32.7 ft.	1,452	Sold on 31 January 1906; for break up at Marseille.	Built by John Elder as City of Brussels for Tait; acquired by CGT on 21 August 1871 and R/n Desirade.	
Désirade	1949	1955-1973	Own	La Hague type cargo vessel	405.4 ft. (bp) x 55.2 ft.	4,061	Arrived at Gadani beach as Kosmas in April 1979; for break up.	Built by Davie Shipbuilding & Repairing as Croisset for Cie. France Navigation; acquired by CGT in 1955 and R/n Désirade; sold in 1973.	—
Dieppe	1942	1947-1954	Mgr	EC-2-S-C1 (Liberty) type cargo vessel	441.6 ft. (oa), 422.8 ft. (bp) x 57 ft.	7,191	Went aground at Brook, Isle of Wight as Brother George on 23 February 1964; towed to Rotterdam; broken up at Hendrik-Ido-Ambacht in July 1964.	Built by Bethlehem Fairfield Shipyard as Robert Treat Paine for the USWSA; acquired by the French Govt. in 1947 and R/n Dieppe (CGT as managers); sold in 1954.	
Domfront	1944	1947-1965	Opr	EC-2-S-C1 (Liberty) type cargo vessel	441.6 ft. (oa), 422.8 ft. (bp) x 57 ft.	7,212	Broken up at Hiroshima as St Lys in March 1967	Built by Permanente Metals as Edward E. Hale for the USWSA; acquired by the French Govt. in 1947 and R/n Domfront (CGT as operators); sold in 1965.	—
Dragut	1880	1880-1907	Own	Dragut type passenger/cargo vessel	182.4 ft. (bp) x 25.6 ft.	556	No longer listed in Lloyd's register as Venere in 1917; assumed broken up.	Built by Scotts; sold in 1907.	—
Duc d'Aumale	1913	1913-1950	Own	Passenger/cargo vessel	378.8 ft. (bp) x 49.3 ft.	4,452	Sold on 31 May 1950; for break up.	Built by Ateliers and Chantiers de Provence.	
Duc de Bragance	1889	1889-1921	Own	Eugène Péreire-type passenger/cargo vessel	334.6 ft. (bp) x 35.1 ft.	2,078	Broken up in Italy in June 1929.	Built by Chantiers et Ateliers de Penhoët, laid down as Maréchal Bugeaud, launched as Duc de Bragance. (Note: The Saint‑Nazaire shipyard was under CGT ownership as Chantiers Scott (1861–1866) and later as Chantiers et Ateliers de Penhoët (1881–1900).)	—
Émile	1866	1913-1915	Own	Cargo vessel	252.1 ft. (bp) x 30.1 ft.	966	Went missing in bad weather off Gibraltar on 6 November 1915 (possibly torpedoed).	Built by Barclay Curle as Sutherland for Donald Currie; acquired by CGT as Émile in 1913.	—
Enseigne Maurice Préhac	1924	1936-1942	Mgr	Cargo vessel	362 ft. (bp) x 49.1 ft.	4,577	Lost as a casualty of war on 25 July 1942.	Built by Forges et Chantiers de la Gironde for Soc. Union Industrielle et Maritime; acquired by CGAM in 1936 (CGT as managers).	—
Equateur	1951	1951-1966	Own	Equateur type cargo vessel	482.3 ft. (oa), 461.5 ft (bp) x 62.3 ft.	7,267	Arrived at Kaohsiung as Nena on 19 June 1979; for break up.	Built by Forges et Chantiers de la Gironde; sold in 1966.	—
Espagne	1910	1910-1916; 1920-1934	Own; Own	Ocean liner	537.8 ft. (bp) x 60.8 ft.	11,155	Broken up at St Nazaire in 1934.	Built by Ateliers and Chantiers de Provence; from 1916 used as a troop transport; re-entered service in 1920.	
Espéranto	1906	1910-1945	Own	Cargo vessel	110 ft. (bp) x 21.1. ft.	209	Broken up in 1945.	Built by Hepple as Prompt for J.H. Beckwith; acquired by CGT in 1910 and R/n Esperanto.	—
Esterél	1937	1937-1939; 1939-1939; 1947-1965	Mgr; Own; Own	Fruit carrier	315 ft. (bp) x 46 ft.	3,165	Foundered at Freetown as Dimitriois Kyriakos on 15 March 1970.	Built by AB Götaverken for CGAM; transferred to CGT in 1939; requisitioned and became the armed merchant cruiser X-21 in September 1939; seized by German forces on 9 December 1942; torpedoed by HMS Shakespeare on 29 March 1943; salvaged in May 1947, repaired and returned to CGT; sold in 1965.	—
Esterél	1967	1967-1969; 1969-1974	Own; Mgr	Car and wine carrier	277.5 ft. (oa) x 44.3 ft.	1,276	Capsized outside Port Sudan as Sackr Al Jazirah on 25 November 1980; beached.	Built by FCM; transferred to CGTM in 1969; sold in 1974.	—
Eugène-Péreire	1888	1888-1951	Own	Eugène-Péreire type passenger/ cargo vessel	334.6 ft. (bp) x 35.1 ft.	2,078	Sold in 1951; for break up.	Built by Chantiers et Ateliers de Penhoët.	—
Europe	1866	1865-1874	Own	Washington type ocean liner	345 ft. x 44 ft.	3,200	Abandoned in the North Atlantic on 10 April 1874.	Built by Scotts.	—
Falaise	1944	1947-1948	Mgr	EC-2-S-C1 (Liberty) type cargo vessel	441.6 ft. (oa), 422.8 ft. (bp) x 57 ft.	7,212	Broken up at Ferrol in 1964.	Built by Permanente Metals as Carl G. Barth for USWSA; acquired by French Govt in 1947 and R/n Falaise (CGT as managers); transferred on 5 June 1948.	—
Ferdinand-de-Lesseps	1875	1879-1911	Own	Stad Haarlem type passenger/cargo vessel	350 ft. (bp) x 38.1 ft.	2,920	Broken up at Dunkirk in October 1911.	Built by A. & J. Inglis as Stad Haarlem for KNSM; completed/ commissioned for Dutch East India; acquired by CGT in August 1879 and R/n initially as Ville de Madrid (but never registered) and then Ferdinand-de-Lesseps.	—
Figuig	1903	1915-1920; 1920-1934	Own; OWn	Ocean liner	350 ft. (bp) x 45.2 ft.	3,655	Sold in 1934; for break up.	Built by Armstrong, Whitworth as Grantala for Adelaide S.S.; acquired by CGT's British subsidiary, Red Funnel Shipping in 1915 and R/n Figuig; transferred to the parent CGT in 1920.	
Finistère	1908	1917-1918	Own	Cargo vessel	249 ft. x 43 ft.	2,112	Disappeared en route to Cardiff on 11 June 1918.	Built by Archibald Macmillan & Sons as Kinmount II for Montreal Transportation; acquired by CGT as Finistère in 1917.	—
Flachat	1880	1880-1898	Own	Abana type cargo vessel	300.2 ft. (bp) x 36 ft.	2,227	Wrecked on Anaga Point on 16 February 1898.	Built by Pearse as Akaba for J. Woods; acquired by CGT in 1880 and R/n Flachat.	—
Flandre	1913	1913-1915; 1919-1940	Own; Own	Ocean liner	464.4 ft. (bp) x 57 ft.	8,571	Sunk by a magnetic mine at the mouth of the Gironde on 14 September 1940.	Built by Chantiers de l'Atlantique; requsitioned by French Govt. (1915-1919); returned to CGT in 1919.	
Flandre	1952	1952-1968	Own	Flandre type ocean liner	599.7 ft. (oa) x 80.3 ft.	20,469	Destroyed by fire at Piraues as Carla Costa on 24 March 1994; salvaged in August 1994; broken up at Izmir in December 1994.	Built by Ateliers et Chantiers de France; sold in February 1968.	
Floride	1862	1862-1897	Own	Louisiane type passenger/cargo vessel	290 ft. (bp) x 39.1 ft.	1,859	Sold for break up 1897.	Built by Caird, commenced construction as Colon for Conte but acquired by CGT on the stocks and R/n Floride; R/n Colombie in 1874.	—
Floride	1907	1907-1915	Own	Floride type passenger/cargo vessel	410.5 ft. (bp) x 52.3 ft.	6,624	Sunk by commerce raider Prinz Eitel Friedrich on 19 February 1915.	Built by Ateliers and Chantiers de Provence.	—
Floride	1921	1925-1929; 1929-1939	Opr; Own	Floride type cargo vessel	429.5 ft. (bp) x 58.3 ft.	7,369	Sunk by a magnetic mine off Dunkirk on 1 December 1939.	Built by Chantiers de Normandie as La Marseillaise for Cie. de Navigation Mixte; chartered by CGT on 25 April 1925; acquired by CGT on 1 December 1929 and R/n Floride.	—
Fort Carillon	1953	1953-1969	Own	Fort Carillon type banana carrier	369.7 ft. (oa) x 51.9 ft.	4,887	Arrived at Kaohsiung as Luk Ho on 18 July 1979; for break up.	Built by Ateliers et Chantiers de Bretagne; sold in 1969.	—
Fort Caroline	1956	1956-1969	Own	Fort Royal type fruit carrier	377 ft. (oa) x 51.8 ft.	5,001	Arrived at Kaohsiung as Pearl Fruit on 12 July 1979; for break up.	Built by Chantiers et Ateliers de Saint‑Nazaire–Penhoët; sold in 1969.	—
Fort d'Orléans	1962	1962-1976	Own	Fort de France type banana carrier	373.5 ft. (oa) x 51.9 ft.	3,921	Damaged by fire at Tampa as Lord d'Orleans on 15 September 1980; total loss.	Built by Ateliers and Chantiers de Provence; sold in 1976.	—
Fort Dauphin	1949	1949-1968	Own	Fort Dauphin type banana carrier	401.9 ft. (oa), 383.7 ft. (bp) x 52.5 ft.	5,038	Laid up as Genoa in December 1979; towed to La Spezia in 1985; for break up.	Built by Stephens; sold in 1968.	—
Fort de Crèvecoeur	1962	1962-1976	Own	Fort de France type banana carrier	373.5 ft. (oa) x 51.9 ft.	3,921	At Busan as Lord Crèvecoeur on 30 June 1984; for break up.	Built by Ateliers and Chantiers de Provence; sold in 1976.	—
Fort de France	1908	—	—	—	—	—	—	refer Pérou	—
Fort de France	1935	1938-1942; 1945-1951	Own	Fort de France type banana carrier	343.5 Ft. (bp) x 48.6 ft.	4,279	Arrived at La Spezia as Frigo Italia on 6 August 1986; for break up.	Built by Odense Stallskibsvaerft as Fort de France for Cie. de Transports Isothermiques; acquired by CGT in 1938; taken over by German forces in November 1942; returned to CGT after the Liberation; sold in January 1951. (Note: Middlemiss compresses several wartime events into a single date, stating that the vessel was scuttled by German forces on 5 May 1943, later refloated and towed to Marseille, and reverted to CGT; the source also notes that the vessel was not repaired until after the war.)	—
Fort de France	1961	1961-1976	Own	Fort de France type banana carrier	373.5 ft (oa) x 51.9 ft.	5,014	Arrived at Busan as Lord de France on 9 July 1984; for break up.	Built by Ateliers and Chantiers de Provence; sold in 1976. (Note: Middlemiss states that in 1973 the vessel was listed as Lord de France but still shown under CGT ownership as Fort de France, and that in 1976 it became Lord de France under Penn Shipping. As Middlemiss provides no inline citations, the status of the name Lord de France during CGT ownership and the timing of the transfer to Penn Shipping are unclear.)	—
Fort Desaix	1953	1953-1969	Own	Fort Carillon type banana carrier	369.7 ft. (oa) x 51.9 ft.	4,886	Arrived at Kaohsiung as Luk Ho on 18 July 1979; for break up.	Built by Ateliers and Chantiers de Provence; sold in 1969.	—
Fort Duquesne	1945	1949-1965	Own	Atlantic Express type banana carrier	376.5 ft. (oa), 359.6 ft. x 51.2 ft.	4,287	Final voyage as Chryssopigi on 24 February 1970; to Shanghai for break up.	Built by Öresundsvarvet as Atlantic Express for Sigurd Herlofsen; acquired by CGT in 1949 and R/n Fort Duquesne; sold in 1965.	—
Fort Fleur d'Epée	1961	1961-1976	Own	Fort de France type banana carrier	373.5 ft. (oa) x 51.9 ft.	3,934	Arrived at Busan as Lord Fleur d'Epée on 15 June 1984; for break up.	Built by Ateliers and Chantiers de Provence; sold in 1976.	—
Fort Frontenac	1958	1958-1972	Own	Fruit Royal type fruit carrier	377 ft. (oa) x 51.8 ft.	3,901	Collided in Galveston Bay as Lord Frontenac on 22 January 1980; towed to Brownsville for break up.	Built by Ateliers and Chantiers de Provence; sold in 1972.	—
Fort Josephine	1964	1964-1977	Own	Fort Josephine type fruit carrier	410.1 ft. (oa) x 55.9 ft.	4,150	Arrived at Kaohsing as Lady Josephine on 27 July 1984; for break up	Built by Ateliers and Chantiers de Provence; sold in 1977.	—
Fort La Reine	1969	1969-1980	Own	Fort La Reine type cargo vessel	486.7 ft. (bp) x 67.1 ft.	9,873	Arrived at Bombay as Rainbow Reefer on 19 September 1993; for break up.	Built by CNIM; sold in 1980.	
Fort Niagara	1958	1958-1969	Own	Fort Royal type fruit carrier	377 ft. (oa) x 51.8 ft.	3,901	Set on fire and abandoned as Niagara on 14 March 1983; drifted ashore near Tour de Calzarello; broken up.	Built by Ateliers and Chantiers de Provence; sold in 1969.	—
Fort Pontchartrain	1969	1969-1980	Own	Fort La Reine type cargo vessel	486.7 ft. (bp) x 67.1 ft.	9,716	Arrived at Calcutta as Rainbow Freezer on 30 July 1994; for break up.	Built by CNIM; sold in 1980.	—
Fort Richelieu	1952	1952-1968	Own	Fort Dauphin type banana carrier	401.9 ft. (oa), 375.4 ft. (bp) x 52.2 ft.	4,287	Arrived at Kaohsiung as Marlinda on 27 November 1969; for break up.	Built by Ateliers and Chantiers de Provence; sold in 1968.	—
Fort Richepanse	1936	1939-1941	Mgr	Fort de France type banana carrier	343.5 ft. (bp) x 48.6 ft.	3,485	Disabled by German aircraft and then torpedoed by U-567 west of Fastnet Island on 3 September 1941.	Built by Odense Stallskibsvaefrt for Cie Transports Isothermiques; acquired by CGAM in March 1939; captured by British forces on 18 February 1941.	—
Fort Richepanse	1949	1949-1968	Own	Fort Dauphin type banana carrier	401.9 ft. (oa), 383.7 ft. (bp) x 52.5 ft.	5,038	Towed to La Spezia as Golfo Degli Angeli in 1985; for break up.	Built by Stephens; sold in 1968.	—
Fort Royal	1935	1938-3939; 1939-1942; 1945-1951	Mgr; Own; Own	Fort de France type banana carrier	343.5 ft (bp) 48.6 ft.	4,279	Arrived at La Spezia as Frigo Africa on 6 August 1968; for break up.	Built by Götaverken AB for Cie de Transports Isothermiques; acquired by CGAM in 1938 (CGT as managers); acquired by CGT in March 1939; taken over by the USWSA on 6 February 1942; returned to CGT on 5 November 1945; sold in February 1951.	—
Fort Saint Louis	1945	1949-1963	Own	Atlantic Express type banana carrier	376.5 ft. (oa), 359.6 ft. x 51.2 ft.	4,287	Final voyage as on 6 September 1973 as Brunsberg; to Kaohsiung for break up.	Built by Öresundsvarvet as Oregon Express for Sigurd Herlofsen; acquired by CGT in 1949 and R/n Fort Saint Louis; sold in 1963.	—
Fort Saint Pierre	1956	1956-1969	Own	Fort Royal type fruit carrier	377 ft. (oa) x 51.8 ft.	4,732	Arrived at La Spezia as Warrington on 19 September 1980; for break up.	Built by Chantiers Reunis Loire-Normandie; sold in 1969.	—
Fort Saint Marie	1969	1969-1979	Own	Fruit carrier	472.7 ft. (oa), 439.7 ft. (bp) x 56.9 ft.	8,554	Broken up as Chateaulin at Alang in March 1998.	Built by Ateliers et Chantiers de Dunkerque & Bordeaux; transferred to Cie. Générale Maritime in 1979.	—
Fort Trinite	1964	1964-1977	Own	Fort Josephine type fruit carrier	410.1 ft. (oa) x 55.9 ft.	4,150	Arrived in Kaohsiung as Lord Trinite on 1 August 1984; for break up.	Built by Ateliers and Chantiers de Provence; sold in 1977.	—
Fournel	1880	1880-1916	Own	Passenger/cargo vessel	300.2 ft. (bp) x 36 ft.	2,187	Sunk by SM U-35 west of Cape St Sebastien on 25 June 1916.	Built by A. & J. Inglis.	—
France	1865	1865-1910	Own	Washington type ocean liner	364 ft. (bp) x 44 ft.	3,200	Sold at Cherbourg in July 1910; for break up.	Built by Chantiers de l'Atlantique.	—
France	1912	1912-1914; 1919-1935	Own; Own	Ocean liner	690.1 ft (bp) x 75.6 ft.	23,666	Left Le Have for Dunkirk on 15 April 1935; for break up.	Built by Chantiers et Ateliers de Saint‑Nazaire–Penhoët, laid down as Picardie, launched as France; requisitioned by French Govt. (1914-1919); returned to CGT as France IV in March 1919 and R/n France.	
France	1961	1961-1977	Own	Ocean liner	1,035 ft. (oa) x 111.9 ft.	66,348	Broken up at Alang as Blue Lady in 2008.	Built by Chantiers de l'Atlantique; sold in 1977.	
Fred Scamaroni	1923	1948-1953	Opr	Passenger/cargo vessel	255 ft. (bp) x 38.2 ft.	1,922	Broken up at La Seyne in November 1956.	Built by Fredrikstad Mekaniske Verksted as Kong Dag for DSND; acquired by the French Govt. for the Corsia service in 1946 and R/n Fred Scamaroni; CGT began operation of the serviuce on 1 May 1948; returned to the State in 1953.	—
Fred-Scamaroni	1966	1966-1969; 1969-1976	Own; Mgr	Ferry	377.3 ft. (oa) x 58.5 ft	4,771	Sank enroute Jeddah-Safaga-Port Suez as Salem Express on 14 December 1991.	Built by FCM; transferred to CGTM in 1969; transferred to SNCM in 1976.	
Frédéric Franck	1875	1912-1917	Own	Cargo vessel	231.2 x (bp) 30.6 ft.	1,026	Wrecked in the Mediterranean in 1917.	Built by Lobnitz for Worms et Cie.; acquired by CGT in 1912.	
Gascoigne	1924	1949-1952	Mgr	Ocean liner	389.9 ft. (oa), 375.5 ft. (bp) x 54 ft.	5,184	Arrived in Hong Kong on 20 July 1955; for break up.	Built by Newport News Shipbuilders as George Washington for the Old Dominion Line; acquired by the French Govt. in 1949, R/n Gascoigne (CGT as managers); transferred to Messageries Maritimes management in 1952.	—
Gatinais	1907	1920-1933	Own	Cargo vessel	291.5 ft (bp) x 44 ft.	2,759	Broken up at Genoa in March 1933.	Built by A.G Neptune as Anna Mezell for Hamburg-Bremer Afrika Linie; ceded to CGT as Irmfried in March 1920 and R/n Gatinais.	—
Général Chanzy	1891	1891-1910	Own	Eugène Péreire-type passenger/cargo vessel	341.2 ft. (bp) x 35.7 ft.	2,295	Struck rocks on NE coast of Minorca on 10 February 1910.	Built by Chantiers et Ateliers de Penhoët, laid down as Biarritz, completed as Général Chanzy.	
Georgie	1912	1912-1934	Own	Georgie type cargo vessel	410.1 ft. (bp) x 52.5 ft.	6,670	Broken up in 1934.	Built by Ateliers and Chantiers de Provence.	—
Gilbert	1924	1929–1945	Own	Tug	56.43 ft. (bp) x 14.11 ft.	24	Did not survive the war.	Built by Appelo's Scheepswerke as De Unie; acquired by CGT in 1929 and R/n Gilbert. (Note: Middlemiss states the vessel did not survive the war; the end date listed is the latest possible date for which the vessel could have remained in service.)	—
Gouverneur Général Chanzy	1921	1922-1943; 1946-1963	Opr; Opr	Mustapha type ocean liner	362.6 ft. (bp) x 53.4 ft.	4,226	Sold and broken up at La Spezia in April 1963.	Built by Cammell Laird for the French Govt (Operated by CGT); seized at Marseille by Italian forces in June 1943; scuttled as Giessen in August 1944; raised, repaired and then returned to service under original name in October 1944. (Note: Middlemiss does not explicitly state that the vessel returned to CGT service after repair; however, his introductory note for this class states they were operated by CGT throughout their careers.)	—
Gouverneur Général de Gueydon	1922	1922-1942	Opr	Mustapha type ocean liner	362.6 ft. (bp) x 53.4 ft.	4,384	Scuttled by the Germans on 7 May 1943.	Built by Ateliers and Chantiers de Provence for the French Govt. (CGT as operators); seized by German forces on 8 December 1942.	—
Gouverneur Général Grevy	1921	1921-1940	Opr	Mustapha type ocean liner	362.6 ft. (bp) x 53.4 ft.	4,565	Scuttled at Marseille as Gottingen on 31 August 1944; raised and broken up at Toulon in 1946.	Built by Arsenal de Brest as P.A.1 for the French Govt; entered service as Gouverneur Général Grevy (CGT as operators); continued in Vichy France service from July 1940. (Note: Middlemiss states July 1940: “continued in Vichy France service” but does not specify the operator; CGT operation after this date cannot be confirmed from the source.)	—
Gouverneur Général Jonnart	1922	1922-1944	Opr	Mustapha type ocean liner	362.6 ft. (bp) x 53.4 ft.	4,513	Sunk as Greifswald on 22 August 1944; raised in 1945, decommissioned in 1948; broken up.	Built by Arsenal de Brest as P.A.2 for the French Govt; entered service as Gouverneur Général Jonnart (CGT as operators); taken over by German forces on 20 June 1944.	—
Grandcamp	1942	1946-1947	Opr	EC-2-S-C1 (Liberty) type cargo vessel	441.6 ft. (oa), 422.8 ft. (bp) x 57 ft.	7,176	Caught fire at Texas City and exploded on 16 April 1947.	Built by California Shipbuilding as Benjamin R. Curtis for USWSA; acquired by the French Govt. in January 1946 and R/n Grandcamp (CGT as operators).	—
Grandlieu	1919	1937-1940	Own	Cambronne type cargo vessel	325 ft (bp) x 45.2 ft.	3,290	Scuttled at the mouth of the Cherbourg in June 1944; wreck demolished in August 1946.	Built by Hong Kong and Whampoa Dock as War Drummer for the Shipping Controller; completed as Grandlieu for Cie. Nantaise de Nav a Vapeur; acquired by CGT in 1937; seized by German forces at Nantes on 26 June 1940.	—
Grand Terre	1932	1933-1939	Mgr	Cargo vessel	366.2 ft. x 40.1 ft.	1,944	Torpedoed by USS Porpoise (SS-172) as Koa Maru on 4 April 1943.	Built by Swan Hunter and Wigham Richardson as Anatolan for Ellerman Papayanni; acquired by CGAM in January 1933 and R/n Grande-Terre; sold in 1939.	—
Graville	1919	1919-1934	Own	Cargo vessel	219 ft. (bp) x 34.2 ft.	1,038	Broken up in Italy as Vettore in 1936.	Built by Chantiers et Ateliers de Saint‑Nazaire–Penhoët as Ajusteur for the French Govt; acquired by CGT in 1919 and R/n Graville; sold in 1934.	—
Grieg	1972			Grieg type RoRo cargo vessel					
Guadeloupe	1855	—	—	—	—	—	—	refer Tampico	
Guadeloupe	1907	1907-1915	Own	Guadeloupe type passenger/cargo vessel	432.6 ft. (bp) x 52.3 ft.	6,586	Captured by the German Armed merchant cruiser Kronprinz Wilhelm and sunk on 9 March 1915.	Built by Chantiers et Ateliers de Saint‑Nazaire–Penhoët, laid down as Port-a-Pitre R/n Guadeloupe.	
Guadeloupe	1908	—	—	—	—	—	—	refer Chicago	
Guadeloupe	1936	1937-1951	Own	Cargo vessel	312.9 ft. x 50 ft.	2,676	Wrecked near Boa Vista as Maneah on 6 March 1963.	Built by Eriksburgs N.V. Aktieb as Croisine for Louis Martin; acquired by CGT in 1937 and R/n Guadeloupe; sold in 1951.	—
Guadeloupe	1949	1953-1972	Own	La Hague type cargo vessel	405.4 ft. (bp) x 55.2 ft.	4,061	Broken up as Asir in April 1979.	Built by Davie Shipbuilding & Repairing as Cantelu for Cie. France Navigation; acquired by CGT in August 1953 and R/n Guadeloupe; sold in 1972.	—
Guatemala	1909	1909-1915	Own	Guatemala type cargo vessel	387.1 ft. (bp) x 51.4 ft.	5,913	Sunk by gunfire from SM U-20 50 miles SW of Belle Ile on 6 September 1915.	Built by Chantiers de Normandie.	—
Guyane	1865	1865-1889	Own	Passenger/cargo vessel	246 ft. (bp) x 28 ft.	940	Grounded in the Caribbean in 1889.	Built by J & G Thomson; sold in 1880.	—
Guyane	1908	1908-1934	Own	Cacique type cargo vessel	325 ft. (bp) x 43.7 ft.	2,917	Broken up in 1934.	Built by Wigham Richardson.	—
Guyane	1934	1935-1942	Mgr	Cargo vessel	313.6 ft. (oa), 294.5 ft. (bp) x 41.5 ft.	1,794	Torpedoed off Toulon as the German Neidersachsen on 15 February 1944.	Built by Burmeister & Wain as Dora for J. Lauritzen A/S; acquired by CGAM on 27 November 1935 and R/n Guyane (CGT as managers); seized by the Italian Govt at Marseille on 4 December 1942.	—
Guyane	1953	1953-1969	Opr	Cargo vessel	221.4 ft (oa) x 30.9 ft.	850	Broken up in 1969.	Built by Ateliers and Chantiers Ziegler Frères for the Ministere de l'Interieur (French Govt), operated by CGT; owner listed as Ministere de la France Outre Mer in 1962. (Note: Middlemiss does not define an operator post 1961; it has been assumed that given it was just a Govt. department change or perhaps rename as opposed to a change in operator.)	—
Guyane	1955	1965-1977	Own	Cargo vessel	423.7 ft. (oa) x 60 ft.	7,062	Severely damaged by fire as Ireon at Bandima on 23 November 1979; arrived at Split on 24 January 1980; for break up.	Built by Ateliers et chantiers de la Seine-Maritime as Ville de Djibouti for Cie. Havraise Peninsulaire de Nav.; acquired by CGT in 1965 and R/n Guyane; sold in 1977.	—
Haïti	1914	1914-1940; 1940-1945; 1946-1951	Own; Opr; Own	Puerto Rico type ocean liner	410.1 ft. (bp) x 51.2 ft.	6,288	Withdrawn in March 1951; broken up.	Built by Ateliers and Chantiers de Provence; R/n Marrakech in 1929; operated for Vichy France (1940-1945); reverted to CGT in 1946.	—
Hermine	1900	1912-1917	Own	Cargo vessel	330 ft. (bp) x 45.4 ft.	3,799	Sunk by SM UC-17 off Harfleur on 16 February 1917.	Built by Craig, Taylor as Nina for Unione Austriaca; acquired by CGT as Hermine in 1912.	—
Honduras	1909	1909-1934	Own	Guatemala type cargo vessel	387.1 ft. (bp) x 51.4 ft.	5,903	Broken up in 1934.	Built by Chantiers de Normandie.	—
Hudson	1905	1905-1919; 1919-1920; 1920-1930	Own; Own; Own	Hudson type passenger/cargo vessel	390.4 ft. (bp) x 50.7 ft.	5,558	Broken up in Ghent in 1930.	Built by Chantiers de Normandie; transferred To Cie. Canadiénne Transatlantique (CGT Joint Venture) in April 1919; reverted back to CGT in 1920.	
Île d'Aix	1919	1940-1940; 1946-1951	Opr; Opr	EFC Hog Islander Design 1022 cargo vessel	390 ft (bp) x 54.2 ft.	5,028	Broken up in 1951.	Built by American International as Lafcomo for USSB; acquired by the French Govt. in 1940 and R/n Île d'Aix (Operated by CGT); seized by German forces in June 1940; returned to CGT in 1946; reverted to French Govt. in 1951.	—
Île de Batz	1918	1940-1940	Opr	Type 1013 cargo vessel	409.6 ft (bp) x 54.2 ft.	5,755	Torpedoed off West Africa by U-68 on 17 March 1942.	Built by Skinner & Eddy as West Hobomac for USSB; passed to the French Govt. in 1940 and R/n Île de Batz (Operated by CGT); came under MoWT control in July 1940.	—
Île de Brehat	1919	1940-1940	Opr	Type 1013 cargo vessel	409.6 ft (bp) x 54.2 ft.	6,176	Lost in an Allied air attack on 11 February 1944.	Built by Northwest Steel as West Tacook for USSB; acquired by the French Govt, in 1940 and R/n Île de Brehat (Operated by CGT); remained with Vichy France in July 1940.	—
Île de Cuba	1914	1914-1916; 1919-1939	Own; Own	Ocean liner	546.7 ft. (bp) x 64 ft.	11,953	Struck a magnetic mine off Le Verdon on 19 June 1940.	Built by Ateliers and Chantiers de Provence as Île de Cuba; R/n Lafayette in 1914; taken over in 1916 for use as a hospital ship; reverted to CGT in July 1919 and overhauled; rebuilt in 1929 and R/n Mexique; laid up in September 1939, then used to carry refugees to Mexico; taken over for use as a troopship in 1940.	—
Île de France	1927	1927-1940; 1946-1958	Own; Own	Ocean liner	792 ft. (oa), 763.7 ft. (bp) x 92 ft.	43,153	Sold on 11 December 1958; for break up; left Le Havre as Furanzu Maru on 26 February 1959; taken over for the film The Last Voyage and R/n Claridon; broken up.	Built by Chantiers et Ateliers de Saint‑Nazaire–Penhoët; taken over by British and French forces (1940-1946); reverted to CGT on 3 February 1946.	
Île de Noirmoutier	1919	1940-1942; 1945-1950	Opr; Mgr	EFC Design 1013 cargo vessel	409.6 ft. (bp) x 54.2 ft.	5,703	Sold for scrap in 1950.	Built by Northwest Steel as Tripp for the USSB; sold to the French Govt. in 1940 and R/n Île de Noirmoutier (Operated by CGT); taken by Allied forces in November 1942; reverted to CGT management in 1945; returned to the French Govt. in 1950.	—
Île de Ouessant	1919	1940-1942	Opr	EFC Design 1013 cargo vessel	409.6 ft. (bp) x 54.2 ft.	6,187	Sunk by an air attack from Allied forces at Casablanca on 8 November 1942.	Built by Northwest Steel as West Chatala for the USSB; sold to the French Govt. in 1940 and R/n Île de Ouessant (CGT as operators).	—
Île de Ré	1918	1940-1940	Opr	EFC Hog Islander Design 1022 cargo vessel	390 ft. (bp) x 54.2 ft	5,104	Returned to French Govt. in 1953; for break up.	Built by American International Shipbuilding as Jomar for the USSB; acquired by the French Govt in 1940 and R/n Île de Ré (CGT operated); came under MOWT control in July 1940.	—
Île Rousse	1918	1937-1942	Own	Cargo vessel	238.8 ft. (bp) x 36.6 ft.	1,471	Sunk by an air attack off Bari as Cosenza on 13 July 1943.	Built by Van Duijendijk as Kleven for Vestlandske Lloyd; acquired by CGT as Île Rousse in 1937; seized by German forces at Marseilles on 7 December 1942.	—
Illinois	1917	1926-1934	Own	Empire type cargo vessel	400.3 ft. (bp) x 51.6 ft	5,911	Torpedoed and sunk by U-122 south of Barra Head as Empire Conveyor on 20 June 1940.	Built by Richardson, Duck as Farnworth for R.S Dagleish; transferred to CGT as Illinois in 1926; sold in 1934.	—
Immaculee Conception	1873	1880-1902	Own	Afrique-type passenger/cargo vessel	260.1 ft. (bp) x 29.8 ft.	1,226	Grounded at Cape Caxine W of Bougie.	Built by Scotts for Cie. Maritime Valery Frères & Fils; taken over by CGT on 7 December 1880.	—
Impératrice Eugenie	1865	1865-1895	Own	Washington type ocean liner	364 ft. x 44 ft.	3,400	Wrecked at Savanilla on 28 February 1895.	Built by Chantiers de l'Atlantique.	—
Imperial	1902	1916-1916	Own	Cargo vessel	365 ft. (bp) x 48.2 ft.	3,818	Captured and sunk enroute Marseilles-Montreal by gunfire from U-35 on 8 August 1916.	Built by Palmers as Imperial for William Thomas; acquired by CGT's British subsidiary, Red Funnell Shipping, in August 1916.	—
Indiana	1915	1919-1942	Opr	Passenger/cargo vessel	420.2 ft. (bp) x 56.2 ft.	5,617	Broken up in the UK as Assimina in 1952.	Built by Bremer Vulkan as Kagera for DOAL; transferred to French Flag on 30 March 1919, operated by CGT and R/n Indiana; laid up in the US in June 1940; taken over by USWSA in 1942.	—
Indochinois	1939	1939-1940; 1948-1957	Opr; Own	Passenger/cargo vessel	467.3 ft. (bp) x 62 ft.	6,966	Sold in April 1963, R/n Ambassade for her voyage to Hong Kong breakers.	Built by Forges et Chantiers de la Gironde for the French Govt. and intended for Messageries Maritimes; exchanged for CGT’s Washington (1929); seized by British forces on 18 October 1940; transferred to CGT ownership in 1948; sold in February 1957. (Note: Middlemiss is not explicit about CGT’s status during 1939–1940, but the vessel remained under French Government ownership and therefore must have been operated by CGT.)	—
Ingenieur Général Harbleicher	1944	1945-1947	Mgr	Empire type cargo vessel	433.5 ft.(oa), 433.5 ft. (bp) x 56.2 ft.	7,067	Ran aground on Stromboli Island on 21 November 1947.	Built by William Hamilton as Empire Call for the MOWT; acquired by the French Govt. in 1945 and R/n Ingénieur Général Haarbleiche (CGT as managers).	—
Insulaire	1861	1880-1888	Own	Passenger/cargo vessel	201.1 ft. (bp) x 24.8 ft.	697	Broken up as Bingazi in 1920	Built by Scotts as Prince Napolean for Cie. Maritime Valery Frères & Fils; taken over by CGT on 7 December 1880 and R/n Insulaire; sold in 1888.	—
Iowa	1906	1919-1921; 1921-1934	Mgr; Own	Cargo vessel	448.9 ft. (bp) x 54.3 ft.	6,648	Broken up in 1934.	Built by Workman Clark as Belgravia II for HAPAG; ceded to France on 30 March 1919 (Managed by CGT) and R/n Iowa; acquired by CGT in 1921.	—
Isaac-Péreire'	1880	1880-1906	Own	Abd el Kader type passenger/cargo vessel	310.2 ft. (bp) x 33.5 ft.	1,855	Wrecked at Cala Mesquida on 26 October 1906.	Built by John Elder, laid down as Saint Louis, launched as Isaac-Péreire.	—
Isère	1887	1917-1917	Own	Collier	325 ft. (bp) x 47 ft.	3,100	Torpedoed by SM U-39 58 miles off Cape Spartel on 23 June 1917.	Built by Richardson, Duck as Glenfield for F. Binnington; acquired by CGT in 1917 and R/n Isère	—
Isigny	1943	1947-1950	Opr	EC-2-S-C1 (Liberty) type cargo vessel	441.6 ft. (oa), 422.8 ft. (bp) x 57 ft.	7,176	Abandoned 200 miles off Luderitz as Odysion on 22 December 1967; sank S of Walvis Bay.	Built by New England Shipbuilding as Ezra Cornell for USWSA; acquired by the French Govt. in 1947 and R/n Isigny (Bare boat charter to CGT); transferred in 1950.	—
Jacques Cartier	1908	—	—	—	—	—	—	refer Caroline	
Jacques Cartier	1918	1918-1920; 1920-1938; 1939-1941	Mgr; Own; Own	La Pérouse type passenger/cargo vessel	469.9 ft. (bp) x 59.7 ft.	8,379	Torpedoed in the N Atlantic by U-443 as Winnipeg II on 22 October 1942.	Built by Ateliers et Chantiers de France for the French Govt. (CGT as managers); acquired by CGT in 1920; R/n Winnipeg in 1929; sold in 1938; reverted to CGT as Paimpol in 1939; R/n Winnipeg; taken over from Vichy France ownership by MOWT in June 1941. (Note: Middlemiss compresses several distinct ownership changes into a single sentence. Jacques Cartier was completed in 1918 for the French Government with CGT as managers, acquired outright by CGT in 1920, and sold in 1938. She reverted to CGT in 1939 as Paimpol, but Middlemiss does not specify the exact date on which Vichy France assumed ownership during 1940–41. His phrasing (“reverted to CGT… taken over by MOWT in June 1941”) is accurate but omits the intermediate Vichy transfer, which can make the timeline appear compressed or contradictory when read without context.)	
Jeanne d'Arc	1883	1913-1923	Own	Passenger/cargo vessel	260 ft. (bp) x 37.1 ft.	1,716	Sold in 1923; for break up at La Syene.	Built by Archibald McMillan as Taurus for Cie. Marsellaise de Nav. a Vapeur; acquired by CGT as Jeanne d'Arc in 1913.	—
Jura	1918	1919-1929	Mgr	D-type cargo vessel	285 ft. (bp) x 42 ft.	2,280	Foundered off Harland Point as Radyr on 7 December 1929.	Built by Harland & Wolff as War Tabard for the Shipping Controller; acquired by CGAM in 1919 and R/n Jura; sold in 1929.	—
Kentucky	1920	1920-1936	Own	Missouri type passenger/cargo vessel	397 ft (bp) x 53.7 ft.	6,614	Broken up in the Netherlands in 1936.	Built by Chantiers de Normandie; laid up in Brest in April 1936.	—
Kléber	1880	1880-1901	Own	Abd el Kader type passenger/cargo vessel	310.2 ft. (bp) x 33.5 ft.	1,900	Wrecked west of Faraman on 17 December 1901.	Built by Caird, laid down as Ville d'Alger, launched as Kléber.	—
Kulmerland	1928	1945-1950	Own	Cargo liner	462.7 ft. (bp) x 61.2 ft.	7,363	Towed to Briton Ferry in 1950; for break up.	Built by Deutsche Werft as Kumerland for HAPAG; scuttled by German forces in 1944; salvaged by the French in 1945 and awarded to CGT; found to be damaged beyond economical repair; laid up.	—
L'Algerie	1885	—	—	—	—	—	—	refer La Gascoigne	—
L'Aude	1908	1908-1915	Own	L'Hérualt type passenger/cargo vessel	277.6 ft. (bp) x 39.1 ft.	2,232	Captured by SM U-39 and sunk by gunfire 45 miles from Oran on 9 September 1915.	Built by Swan Hunter & Wigham Richardson.	—
L'Hérault	1906	1906-1916	Own	L'Hérualt type passenger/cargo vessel	278.3 ft (bp) x 39.1 ft.	2,299	Captured by SM U-35 and sunk by gunfire 45 miles N of Cape Antonio on 23 June 1916.	Built by Ateliers and Chantiers de Provence.	
La Baule	1949	1949-1951; 1951-1969	Mgr; Own	La Hague type cargo vessel	420.5 ft (oa), 404 ft (bp) x 55.1 ft.	4,310	Arrived in tow at Santander as Roraima on 14 December 1977; for break up.	Built by Harland and Wolff for CGAM; transferred to CGT ownership in 1951; sold in 1969.	—
La Bourdonnais	1904	1921-1934	Own	Feldherren-class ocean liner	453.5 ft. (bp) x 55.8 ft.	8,338	Broken up at Genoa in 1934.	Built by Joh. C. Tecklenborg as Scharnhorst for NDL; taken over by French Govt in 1919; allocated to CGT in 1921 and R/n La Bourdannais	
La Bourgogne	1885	1886-1898	Own	La Champagne-type ocean liner	495.4 ft (bp) x 52.2 ft.	7,395	Collided with Cromartyshire and sank off Cape Sable on 4 July 1898.	Built by FCM.	
La Bretagne	1886	1886-1912; 1912-1916	Own; Mgr	La Champagne-type ocean liner	495.4 ft. (bp) x 51.75 ft.	7,112	Sold out of lay up as Alesia in December 1923; for break up; tow broke, drifted ashore and sank.	Built by FCM; transferred to Cie de Navigation Sud-Atlantique in 1912. (Note: Middlemiss is inconsistent in his treatment of Cie. de Navigation Sud‑Atlantique management. For some vessels he states CGT management for an early period but omits the later change; for others he is silent throughout, and at times he misses the Chargeurs Réunis transition to management in 1916. Middlemiss p. 11 records that Sud‑Atlantique was formed jointly with Chargeurs Réunis and that CGT were the managers until Chargeurs Réunis took over in 1916. Because the vessel‑level entries are often ambiguous or omit this transition, this list applies the management chronology from p. 11 uniformly: CGT management until 1916, Chargeurs Réunis thereafter.)	
La Champagne	1885	1886-1915	Own	La Champagne-type ocean liner	493.4 ft. (bp) x 51.8 ft.	7,087	Ran aground at entrance to Saint Nazaire on 29 May 1915; broken up.	Built by Chantiers et Ateliers de Penhoët.	
La Corse	1873	1880-1902	Own	Afrique-type passenger/cargo vessel	260.1 ft. (bp) x 29.8 ft.	1,226	Broken up at Manila as De La Rama in 1910.	Built by Scotts for Cie. Maritime Valery Frères & Fils; acquired on 7 December 1880; sold in January 1902.	
La Coubre	1948	1948-1951; 1951-1972	Mgr; Own	La Hague type cargo vessel	420.5 ft (oa), 404 ft (bp) x 55.1 ft.	4,310	Sold as Notios Hellas in 1979; arrived in tow at Gandia on 11 December 1979; for break up.	Built by Canadian Vickers for the French Govt. and operated by CGAM; transferred to CGT in 1951; sold in 1972.	—
La Dives	1897	1915-1918	Own	Ocean liner	272.1 ft. (bp) x 36.7 ft.	1,825	Torpedoed by SM UB-52 NW of Cape Caebon on 1 February 1918.	Built by NSM as Prins Willem V for Koninklijke West-Indische Maildienst; acquired by CGT in 1915 and R/n La Dives.	
La Drome	1900	1912-1933	Own	Durndale type cargo vessel	344 ft. (bp) x 45.1 ft	3,236	Broken up in Spain in 1933.	Built by Swan Hunter & Wigham Richardson as Mont-Cenis for Soc. Générale de Transports Maritimes; acquired by CGT in January 1912 and rn La Drome.	—
La Garonne	1906	1906-1934	Own	La Garonne type general cargo and wine carrier	298.5 ft (bp) x 40.1 ft.	2,611	Broken up in 1934.	Built by Chantiers de Normandie.	—
La Gascoigne	1885	1885-1912; 1912-1915	Own; Mgr	La Champgane-type Ocean liner	403.3 ft (bp) x 51.8 ft.	7,395	Arrived in Genoa on 1 July 1919; for break up.	Built by FCM, laid down as L'Algerie, launched as La Gascgoine; transferred to Cie. Générale Sud-Atlantique in June 1912; requisitioned on 10 September 1915 and converted to auxiliary cruiser; returned to Cie. Générale Sud-Atlantique on 4 November 1916. (Note: Where Roche and Middlemiss diverge substantially, Roche is taken as the authoritative source for French Government and naval service. Roche provides detailed requisition, commissioning, auxiliary, troopship, hospital‑ship, and return‑to‑owner dates drawn from Marine Nationale archives. Middlemiss is primarily a commercial historian and is often brief or incomplete on government service; therefore Roche is used whenever Middlemiss’s coverage of naval periods is poor or absent, while Middlemiss remains the principal source for CGT commercial chronology.)	
La Hague	1947	1947-1951; 1951-1971	Mgr; Own	La Hague type cargo vessel	420.1 ft (oa), 404 ft. (bp) x 55.1 ft.	4,310	Arrived at Kaohsiung as Rio Jamapa on 4 April 1974; for break up.	Built by Harland & Wolff for the French Govt. and operated by CGAM (CGT as managers); transferred to CGT in 1951; sold in 1971.	—
La Héve	1947	1947-1952; 1952-1970	Mgr; Own	La Hague type cargo vessel	420.1 ft (oa), 404 ft. (bp) x 55.1 ft.	4,310	Sold as Parima in late 1973; arrived in Kaohsiung on 4 April 1974; for break up.	Built by Harland & Wolff for the French Govt. and operated by CGAM; transferred to CGT in 1951; sold in 1971.	—
La Lorraine	1899	1900-1914; 1919-1922	Own; Own	Lorraine-type ocean liner	563.1 ft. (bp) x 60 ft.	11,146	Broken up at Penhoët in 1922.	Built by Chantiers et Ateliers de Penhoët; became auxiliary cruiser Lorraine II in August 1914 and troopship La Lorrraine in 1917; returned to service on 23 April 1919.	
La Marseillaise	1921	—	—	—	—	—	—	refer Floride	
La Navarre	1892	1893-1925	Own	Ocean liner	471 ft. (bp) x 50.5 ft.	5,130	Laid up for sale at Le Havre in 1924; broken up at Dunkirk in 1925.	Built by Chantiers et Ateliers de Penhoët.	
La Nièvre	1881	1915-1929	Own	Passenger/cargo vessel	300.2 ft (bp) x 36.4 ft	2,237	Broken up in 1929.	Built by Archibald MacMillan as Stamboul for Cie. Marsaillaise de Nav. a Vapeur; acquired by CGT in November 1915 and R/n La Nièvre.	—
La Normandie	1883	—	—	—	—	—	—	refer Normandie	—
La Pérouse	1916	1920-1924	Mgr	La Pérouse type passenger/cargo vessel	469.9 ft (bp) x 59.7 ft.	9,717	Arrived at Blyth at Trojan Star on 25 May 1955; for break up.	Built by Ateliers et Chantiers de France, launched as Aberdeenshire, completed as La Pérouse for CGAM; French Govt owned; returned to CGT; sold in 1924. (Note: Middlemiss compresses several distinct wartime events into a single sentence. La Pérouse was laid down in 1914 as a CGAM commercial order, but the French Government intervened during WWI and assumed ownership. Middlemiss does not state whether CGAM or CGT had any managerial involvement during the wartime period, and this uncertainty is not resolved in his narrative. His phrasing (“completed for CGAM; French Govt owned”) reflects the sequence but omits the wartime intervention and the unclear management status, which can make the timeline appear contradictory when read without context.)	—
La Provence	1905	1905-1916	Own	Ocean liner	626 ft. (bp) x 65 ft.	13,752	Sunk by SM U-35 in the Central Méditerranéan on 26 February 1916.	Built by Chantiers et Ateliers de Saint‑Nazaire–Penhoët.	
La Rance	1906	1906-1934	Own	La Garonne type general cargo and wine carrier	298.5 ft (bp) x 40.1 ft.	2,610	Broken up in 1934.	Built by Chantiers de Normandie.	—
La Rochelle	1906	1906-1922	Own	Cargo vessel	191 ft (bp) x 30.4 ft.	844	Foundered as Attilio enroute to Benghazi in July 1935.	Built by Ateliers et Chantiers de France; sold in 1922.	—
La Savoie	1900	1901-1914; 1919-1927	Own; Own	Lorraine type ocean liner	563.1 ft. (bp) x 60 ft.	11,168	Left for Dunkirk on 24 November 1927; for break up.	Built by Chantiers et Ateliers de Penhoët; became an auxiliary cruiser on 14 August 1914; later served as troopship; returned to service on 23 April 1919.	
La Somme	1897	1917-1922	Own	Cargo vessel	325 ft. (bp) x 47 ft.	3,100	Sunk by aerial torpedo on 23 January 1943.	Built by John Blumer as City of York for Portwood S.S.; acquired by CGT in 1917 and R/n La Somme; transferred to Soc. Française d'Armement Emile Frisch in 1922, in part exchange for their Saint Aygulf.	—
La Touraine	1890	1890-1914; 1918-1923	Own; Own	Ocean liner	520.2 ft. (bp) x 56 ft.	8,893	For sale in August 1923; broken up at Dunkirk in October 1923.	Built by Chantiers et Ateliers de Penhoët; requisitioned by the French Govt. (1914-1918); returned to CGT; moored at Gothenburg as hotel ship in June 1923 and R/n Maritime.	
La Valette	1880	1880-1889	Own	Cargo vessel	180.4 ft (bp) x 24.9 ft.	564	Wrecked at Sables d'Olonne on 29 January 1889.	Built by Caird as Cartsdyke for R. Shankland; acquired shortly after completion and renamed La Valette. (Note: Editor can find no record of this vessel ever being registered under the name Cartsdyke or for Shankland; she appears in Bureau Veritas registers and in Scottish Built Ships only as CGT’s La Valette.)	
La Vendée	1887	1887-1888	Own	Le Morbihan-type coastal trading vessel	231 ft. (bp) x 33.3 ft.	960	Grounded near Tarifa on 24 December 1888.	Built by Hawthorn, Leslie.	—
Labrador	—	—	—	—	—	—	—	refer Nouveau Monde.	
Lafayette	1863	1863-1906	Own	Washington type ocean liner	345 ft. (bp) x 44 ft.	3,375	Broken up at the Brest Naval Yard in 1906.	Built by Scotts; converted to screw propulsion 1868.	
Lafayette	1914	—	—	—	—	—	—	refer Ile de Cuba	Carte postale du paquebot lafayette (1915-28)
Lafayette	1930	1930-1938	Own	Ocean liner	610 ft. (bp) x 83 ft.	25,178	Caught fire during an overhaul at Le Havre on 4 May 1938; broken up at Rotterdam.	Built by Chantiers et Ateliers de Saint‑Nazaire–Penhoët.	
Lamentin	1895	1914-1916; 1916-1925	Mgr; Own	Cargo vessel	371.2 ft. (bp) x 44.2 ft.	3,780	Broken up in Italy in 1925.	Built by Blohm+Voss as Bellona for Emile R. Retzlaff; taken over by the French Govt. on 4 August 1914 (CGT as managers) and R/n Lamentin; acquired by CGT in 1916.	—
Lamoricière	1920	1921-1940	Own	Ocean liner	370 ft. (bp) x 50 ft.	4,713	Foundered in a storm 3 miles north of Minorca on 8 January 1942.	Built by Swan Hunter & Wigham Richardson; retained for Vichy Service in June 1940.	
Languedoc	1966	—	—	—	—	—	—	refer Rousillon	
Le Calvados	1890	1890-1915	Own	Le Tarn type passenger/cargo vessel	276.6 ft. (bp) x 35.4 ft.	1,678	Torpedoed by SM U-38 whilst sailing as unberthed troopship 22 miles NW of Cape Ivi on 4 November 1915.	Built by John Cockerill.	—
Le Chatelier	1879	1880-1890	Own	Abana type cargo vessel	300.2 ft (bp) x 36 ft.	2,277	Grounded near Saint Gildas on 13 November 1890.	Built by Pearse as Abana for J.M. Wood; acquired by CGT in June 1880 and R/n Le Chatelier.	
Le Gard	1890	1890-1918	Own	Le Tarn type passenger/cargo vessel	276.6 ft. (bp) x 35.4 ft.	1,678	Torpedoed by SM UB-49 8 miles N of Cape Bengut on 26 May 1918.	Built by John Cockerill.	—
Le Morbihan	1887	1887-1914; 1919-1926	Own; Own	Le Morbihan-type coastal trading vessel	231 ft. (bp) x 33.3 ft.	960	Broken up in 1926.	Built by Hawthorn, Leslie; requisitioned as a French Navy supply ship 1914-1919; reverted to CGT in 1919.	—
Le Moyne d'Iberville	1949	1949-1968	Own	Cavalier de la Salle type cargo vessel	466.6 ft (bp) x 61.8 ft.	6,933	Collided as Garden City with Zaglebie Dabrowskie 13.5 miles NE of Sandettie on 19 March 1969.	Built by Forges et Chantiers de la Gironde; sold in 1968.	
Le Tarn	1889	1889-1917	Own	Le Tarn type passenger/cargo vessel	276.6 ft (bp) x 35.4 ft.	1,678	Torpedoed by SM U-64 10 miles NW of Cape Ivi on 26 October 1917.	Built by John Cockerill.	—
Lens	1959	1959-1969	Own	Lens-type OB(O) carrier	610.2 ft. (oa) x 77 ft.	18,047	Gutted by fire as Irenes Sincerity 180 miles off Karachi on 15 July 1981; arrived at Gadani beach on 19 December; for break up.	Built by FCM; sold in 1969.	—
Leopoldina	1902	1920-1923; 1923-1929	Opr; Own	Barbarossa-class ocean liner	528 ft. (bp) x 62.3 ft.	11,948	Withdrawn in October 1928 and laid up at Le Havre; broken up in Genoa in May 1929.	Built by Blohm & Voss as Blücher for HAPAG; ceded to France as Leopoldina in 1919; chartered to CGT on 11 March 1920; acquired by CGT in March 1923 and R/n Suffren.	—
Lezardrieux	1922	1939-1940	Mgr	Cargo vessel	194.6 ft (bp) x 32.9 ft.	934	Gutted by fire as Vega when at anchor in Saigon Roads on 26 April 1952.	Built by Howaldtswerke-Deutsche Werft as Leona for D. Fuhrmann; acquired by Cie France Navigation in June 1937 and R/n Lezardieux; taken over by CGT in September 1939 (same name); returned to Cie France Navigation (in liquidation) in 1946.	—
Liberté	1930	1946-1962	Own	Bremen-type ocean liner	890.2 ft. (bp) x 102 ft.	49,746	Sold in December 1961 for break up; arrived at La Spezia on 30 January 1962.	Built by Blohm & Voss as Europa for NDL; ceded to France in June 1946 to replace Normandie and R/n Liberté; broke loose of her moorings on 9 December 1946 and scuttled; raised on 15 April 1947 and rebuilt.	
Lieutenant J. Le Meur	1943	1946-1949	Mgr	Empire type cargo vessel	432.8 ft. (bp) x 57.2 ft.	7,240	Arrived at Kaohsiung as Propontis on 24 May 1966; for break up.	Built by J. L. Thompson and Sons as Empire Duke for the MOWT; acquired by the French Govt. in May 1945 and R/n Lieutenant J. Le Meur (CGT as managers); transferred in 1949.	—
Limoges	1919	1940-1940; 1945-1947; 1947-1948	Opr; Mgr; Own	Cargo vessel	244.6 ft (bp) x 42.1 ft.	2,256	Deleted from Lloyd's register as Prado in 1962.	Built by Long Beach Shipbuilding as Wallingford for the USSB; acquired by French Govt. in 1940 and R/n Limoges (Operated by CGT); seized by the Canadian Govt. in August 1940; returned to France in 1945 and managed by CGAM; transferred to CGT ownership in 1947 but not required; sold in 1948.	—
Lisieux	1944	1947-1952	Mgr	EC-2-S-C1 (Liberty) type cargo vessel	441.6 ft. (oa), 422.8 ft. (bp) x 57 ft.	7,176	Broken up in Shanghai as Albur in 1969.	Built by Permanente Metals as William Peffer for the USWSA; acquired by the French Govt. in 1947 and R/n Lisieux (CGT as managers); transferred in 1952.	—
Loire	1928	1938-1939	Mgr	Passenger/cargo vessel	370 ft (bp) x 51 ft.	4,285	Wrecked near Malaga on 12 November 1939.	Built by Lithgows as Irrawaddy for British and Burmese Steam Navigation; acquired by CGT in 1938 and R/n Loire, chartered to CGAM.	—
Loire	1960	1960-1976	Own	Tanker	656.2 ft. (oa), 640.4 ft (bp) xz 86.4 ft.	21,107	Arrived in Bilbao on 15 April 1976; for break up.	Built by Ateliers et Chantiers de France for CGT; entered service with CGAM on 20 July 1960.	—
Longwy	1959	1959-1970	Mgr	Lens-type OB(O) carrier	610.2 ft. (oa) x 77.1 ft.	18,047	Arrived at Kaohsiung as Arne on 13 October 1982; for break up.	Built by Ateliers et chantiers de la Seine-Maritime for CGAM (CGT as managers); sold in 1970.	—
Lou Cettori	1873	1880-1906	Own	Afrique-type passenger/cargo vessel	260.1 ft (bp) x 29.8 ft.	1,228	Broken up in April 1906.	Built by Scotts for Cie. Maritime Valery Frères & Fils; taken over by CGT on 7 December 1880.	—
Louisiane	1862	1862-1875	Own	Louisiane type passenger/cargo vessel	290 ft. (bp) x 39.1 ft.	1,859	Sunk in a collision with Gironde off Pauillac on 20 December 1875.	Built by Caird commencing construction as Cortes for Conte; acquired on the stocks by CGT and R/n Louisiane.	
Louisiane	1905	1905-1916	Own	Louisiane type passenger/cargo vessel	355.64 ft. (bp) x 47.24 ft.	5,104	Torpedoed by SM UB-18 at Havre Roads, 3 miles off Cap de la Héve on 9 March 1916.	Built by Ateliers et Chantiers de France.	—
Louisiane	1921	1925-1929; 1929-1939	Opr; Own	Floride type cargo vessel	429.5 ft. (bp) x 58.3 ft.	6,903	Torpedoed by U-48 3 miles off Cap de la Hève on 13 October 1939.	Built by Chantiers et Ateliers de Saint‑Nazaire–Penhoët as Notre Dame de Fourvière for Cie. de Navigation Mixte; chartered to CGT in 1925; acquired by CGT on 1 December 1929 and R/n Louisiane.	—
Louisiane	1969	1975-1977	Own	Cargo vessel	437.6 ft. (bp) x 65.25 ft.	4,522	Still sailing as Guang Yun as of 2006.	Built by Howaldtswerke-Deutsche Werft as Hormeer for the de:Horn-Linie; acquired by CGT in 1975 and R/n Louisiane; transferred to CGM in 1977.	—
Lozère	1910	1920-1928	Own	Cargo vessel	277.7 ft (bp) x 39.2 ft	2,365	Wrecked at Cauvreus Bay, Kerguelen Islands on 12 February 1928.	Built by Sciffswereke H. Koch as Larache for Oldenburg Portuguesische Dampfahrt; ceded to France in 1920, allocated to CGT and R/n Lozère.	—
Macoris	1902	1920-1935	Own	Ocean liner	411.2 ft. (bp) x 48.1 ft.	5,879	Broken up in France in 1935.	Built by Flensburger Schiffbau-Gesellschaft as Bürgermeister for DOAL; ceded to France in February 1919; acquired by CGT on 10 September 1920 and R/n Macoris.	
Magellan	1958	1958-1978	Own	Magellan type cargo vessel	490.45 ft. (oa) x 61.8 ft.	9,186	Laid up 1979; broken up as Elbreeze.	Built by Ateliers and Chantiers de Provence; sold in 1978.	
Malvina	1866	1880-1910	Own	Passenger/cargo vessel	236.9 ft. (bp) x 30.1 ft.	898	Sold and broken up in Marseilles on 7 September 1910.	Built by J & G Thomson; taken over by CGT on 7 September 1880.	—
Manoubia	1880	1880-1899	Own	Manoubia type passenger/cargo vessel	234.9 ft (bp) x 29.5 ft.	1,080	Wrecked at Port au Prince on 7 April 1899.	Built by FCM.	—
Maréchal Bugeaud	1889	—	—	—	—	—	—	refer Duc de Bragance	—
Maréchal Bugeaud	1889	1889-1927	Own	Eugène Péreire-type passenger/cargo vessel	342.5 ft. (bp) x 34.1 ft	2,206	Broken up in Italy in October 1927.	Built by Chantiers et Ateliers de Penhoët, laid down as Mogador, launched as Maréchal Bugeaud.	—
Maréchal Canrobert	1873	1880-1892	Own	Afrique-type passenger/cargo vessel	260.1 ft (bp) x 29.8 ft.	1,288	Collided with Hoche and sank outside Bone on 7 July 1892.	Built by Scotts for Cie. Maritime Valery Frères & Fils; acquired by CGT on 7 December 1880.	—
Marie Galante	1906	1907-1931	Own	Cargo vessel	120.5 ft. (bp) x 21.6 ft.	266	Broken up in 1931.	Built by Gebrudder J.A. and G.S Fernout (Speculative); purchased by Joseph Constant and R/n Despatch; acquired by CGT in 1907 and R/n Marie Galante.	—
Marigot	1900	1919-1921; 1921-1934	Opr; Own	Cargo vessel	402.3 ft. x 47.1 ft.	4,985	Broken up in Italy in 1934.	Built by Bremer Vulkan as Strassburg for NDL; ceded to France on 30 March 1919 (Operated by CGT) and R/n Marigot; acquired by CGT in 1921.	—
Marigot	1932	—	—	—	—	—	—	refer Ardéche	—
Maritime	1890	—	—	—	—	—	—	refer La Touraine	—
Maroc	1951	—	—	—	—	—	—	refer Ville de Marseille	
Maroni	1909	1909-1916	Own	Basse Terre type cargo vessel	316.2 ft. (bp) x 44 ft.	3,109	Sunk by German raider Möwe 400 miles W of Cape Finisterre on 24 February 1916.	Built by Ateliers and Chantiers de Provence.	—
Marrakech	1914	—	—	—	—	—	—	refer Haiti.	—
Martinière	1911	1937-1939	Own	Cargo vessel	360 ft. (bp) x 47.1 ft.	3,871	Destroyed by British air attack at Lorient in June 1940; broken up at St Nazaire in 1955.	Built by William Gray as Armanistan for Anglo-Algerian Steamship; acquired by CGT as Martinière in 1937; taken over by French Govt. in September 1939.	
Martinique	1854	—	—	—	—	—	—	refer Vera Cruz	—
Martinique	1883	1903-1932	Own	Passenger ship	380.7 ft. (bp) x 48.2 ft.	4,241	Broken up in 1932.	Built by John Elder as Norham Castle for Castle Line; acquired by CGT in 1903 and R/n Martinique.	
Martinique	1933	1934-1937	Mgr	Fruit carrier	263.6 ft. (bp) x 39.8 ft.	1,416	Broken up as Jagdamba at Bombay in November 1936.	Built by Helsingør Skibsværft og Maskinbyggeri as Ninna for Vesterhavet; acquired by CGAM on 20 October 1934 and R/n Martinique; sold in 1937.	—
Martinique	1949	1953-1973	Own	La Hague type cargo vessel	405.4 ft. (bp) x 55.2 ft.	4,061	Arrived in Bombay as Climax Guardian on 6 March 1979; broken up in April 1979.	Built by ACL as Caumont for France Navigation; acquired by CGT in July 1953; R/n Martinique on 13 August 1953; sold in 1973.	—
Maryland	1919	1920-1935	Own	Maryland type cargo vessel	472.2 ft. (oa), 401.5 ft. (bp) x 54.1 ft.	5,446	Broke in two off Sheerness as Marpesa after striking a mine on 21 February 1921.	Built by J. Coughlan and Sons as War Noble for the Shipping Controller; acquired by CGT in 1920 and R/n Maryland; sold in 1935.	—
Maryland	1958	1958-1976	Own	Magellan type cargo vessel	490.45 ft. (bp) x 61.8 ft.	9,224	Left Dubai as Senang Island on 19 May 1981; at Gadani Beach on 30 May 1981; for break up.	Built by Ateliers and Chantiers de Provence; sold in 1976.	—
Matelot-Becuwe	1943	1944-1948	Mgr	Empire type cargo vessel	429.8 ft. (bp) x 56.3 ft.	7,083	Broken up as Stephen Karadja at Split in 1973.	Built by J. L. Thompson and Sons as Empire Welfare for the MOWT, acquired by French Govt. in January 1944 and R/n Matelot Becuwe (CGT as managers); returned to the state in 1948.	
Matouba	1908	1908-1931	Own	Coaster	140 ft. (bp) x 26.1 ft.	446	Broken up in 1931.	Built by W. Walker (Speculative); acquired by CGT in November 1908.	—
Maurienne	1938	1938-1939; 1939-1940; 1947-1958	Mgr; Own; Own	Quercy type banana carrier	315 ft (bp) x 45.5 ft	3,259	Destroyed by fire at Hong Kong as Forecariah on 8 December 19262.	Built by Burmeister and Wain for CGAM (CGT as managers); transferred to CGT in 1939; taken over at Halifax, Nova Scotia in July 1940; returned to CGT in 1947; sold in June 1958.	—
Mayenne	1909	1928-1942	Own	Passenger/cargo vessel	322.7 ft. (bp) x 46 ft.	2,794	Sunk by aerial torpedo off Capr Gallo on 11 May 1943.	Built by Swan Hunter and Wigham Richardson as Saga for Angartygs Aktieebolaget; acquired by CGT in 1928 and R/n Mayenne; seized by Italian forces at Marseille in 1942 and R/n Fabriano.	—
Méditerranée	1948	1967-1968; 1968-1968; 1968-1971	Opr; Own; Mgr	Passenger/cargo vessel	402 ft. (bp) x 53.7 ft	5,324	Broken up in Greece as Acardi in 1985.	Built by Swan Hunter and Wigham Richardson as Président de Cazalet for Cie. de Navigation Mixte; transferred to CGT on bareboat charter in May 1967 and R/n Méditerranée; acquired by CGT in 1968 and transferred to CGTM; sold in 1971.	—
Meknès	1914	—	—	—	—	—	—	refer Puerto Rico	—
Mexico	1905	1905-1934	Own	Louisiane type Passenger/cargo vessel	355.64 ft. (bp) x 47.24 ft.	5,104	Broken up in 1923.	Built by FCM.	—
Mexique	1914	—	—	—	—	—	—	refer Ile de Cuba	
Michigan	1920	1920-1949	Own	Cargo vessel	412.5 ft (bp) x 55.5 ft.	6,419	Broken up in Italy as Republika in 1963.	Built by J. L. Thompson and Sons; sold in 1949.	
Michigan	1959	1959-1976	Own	Magellan type cargo vessel	490.45 ft. (bp) x 61.8 ft.	9,235	Grounded near Saudi Arabia as Brani Island on 19 July 1980.	Built by Ateliers and Chantiers de Provence; sold in 1976.	
Minnesota	1904	1926-1934	Own	Cargo vessel	410 ft. (bp) x 50.9 ft.	6,118	Broken up in 1934.	Built by Blohm & Voss as Elkab for DDG Kosmos; acquired by CGT as La Belle France in 1926 and R/n Minnesota.	—
Minotaure	1918	1929-1940; 1945-1958	Own; Own	Tug	175 ft. (bp) x 34.2 ft.	357	Broken up in Belgium in 1959.	Built by Ferguson Brothers as HMS Rollcall; acquired by CGT as Romney in 1929 for passenger tendering and R/n Minotaure; seized by German forces in 1940; damaged by aerial bombing on 4 July 1944, scuttled as St Malo; raised and repaired in 1945; sold in 1958.	
Miranda	1920	—	—	—	—	—	—	refer Ouezzan	—
Mississippi	1913	1913-1934	Own	Géorgie-type cargo vessel	410.1 ft (bp) x 52.5 ft.	6,669	Sold in 1934; for break up.	Built by Ateliers and Chantiers de Provence.	—
Mississippi	1960	1960-1973	Own	Magellan-type cargo vessel	490.45 ft (bp) x 61.8 ft.	9,235	Arrived at Kaohsiung on 27 October 1978; for break up.	Built by Ateliers and Chantiers de Provence; transferred to Cie. Générale Maritime on 21 December 1973.	—
Missouri	1920	1920-1936	Own	Missouri type passenger/cargo vessel	397 ft. (bp) x 53.7 ft.	6,773	Sold in 1936; to Germany for break up.	Built by Chantiers et Ateliers de Saint‑Nazaire–Penhoët.	—
Mistral	1913	1913-1942	Own	Tug	38.1 ft (bp) x 12 ft.	18 (NRT)	Lasted until the German occupation of Marseilles in 1942.	Built by Ateliers and Chantiers de Provence	—
Mogador	1889	—	—	—	—	—	—	refer Maréchal Bugeaud.	—
Mogador	1952	1952-1964	Mgr	Safi type livestock and wine carrier	269 ft (oa) x 39.4 ft.	1,164	Still in service as Esteban as of 1996	Built by Haarlemse Scheepsbouw Maatschappij for CGAM (CGT as managers); sold in 1964.	—
Mohamed Es Sadock	1873	1880-1886	Own	Afrique-type passenger/cargo vessel	260.1 ft. (bp) x 29.8 ft.	1,235	Wrecked off Algiers on 22 December 1886.	Built by Scotts for Cie. Maritime Valery Frères & Fils; taken over by CGT on 7 December 1880.	—
Moïse	1880	1880-1923	Own	Moïse type passenger/cargo vessel	310 ft. (bp) x 33.6 ft.	1,873	Sold on 27 March 1923; for break up.	Built by John Elder.	—
Mont Blanc	1899	1915-1916	Own	Cargo vessel	320 ft. (bp) x 44.8 ft.	3,279	Loaded with ammunition, collided with Imo and exploded in the Narrows, Halifax Harbour, on 6 December 1916.	Built by Raylton Dixon for Soc. Générale de Transports Maritimes; acquired by CGT in 1915.	
Mont Laurier	1972	1972-1973	Mgr	Mont-Laurier type RORO container vessel	442.9 ft. (oa), 393.7 ft (bp) x 63.5 ft.	4,210	Still in service as Seaboard Trader in 2006.	Built by Wärtsilä Oyj Abp for Cie. Atlantique Maritime (CGT as managers); caught fire 300 miles off Corvo on 13 January 1973; taken in tow, arrived at St Michaels and declared fit for rebuilding; sold to J. Lauritzen from underwriters.	—
Mont Louis	1972	1972-1977	Mgr	Mont-Laurier type RORO container vessel	442.9 ft. (oa), 393.7 ft (bp) x 63.5 ft.	4,210	Sank ten miles off Ostend after a collision with Olua Brittania on 28 August 1984.	Built by Wärtsilä Oyj Abp for the subsidiary Cie. Atlantique Maritime (CGT as managers); transferred to Cie. Generale Martime in 1977.	—
Mont Ventoux	1904	1920-1929	Own	Durndale type cargo vessel	344 ft. (bp) x 45.1 ft.	3,233	Sold in August 1929; for break up.	Built by Swan Hunter & Wigham Richardson as Durndale for H.E. Moss; acquired by CGT as Mont Ventoux on 24 December 1920.	—
Montana	1903	1920-1928	Own	Ocean liner	412 ft. (bp) x 51 ft.	6,053	Wrecked on Le Désirade Island on 22 March 1928.	Built by Blohm and Voss as Edfu for DDG Kosmos; ceded to France as Usamburu on 3 June 1919; passed to CGT on 1 December 1920 and R/n Montana.	—
Monte Cinto	1969	1969-1976; 1976-1981	Own; Mgr	Ro‑Ro cargo vessel (with bulk wine tanks)	327 ft. (oa) x 48.8 ft.	2,080	Sank as Nancy in Mumbai in heavy weather on 16 June 2004	Built by ACH; transferred to CGMT in 1976; sold in 1981.	—
Montréal	1896	1905-1917	Own	Minho type Passenger/cargo vessel	345.7 ft. (bp) x 44.1 ft.	3,445	Torpedoed by SM U-46 in the Bay of Biscay on 24 March 1917.	Built by Robert Napier and Sons as Minho for the Royal Mail Steam Packet; acquired by CGT on 25 February 1905 and R/n Montréal.	—
Mortain	1942	1947-1948	Opr	EC-2-S-C1 (Liberty) type cargo vessel	441.6 ft. (oa), 422.8 ft. (bp) x 57 ft.	7,176	Broken up as Alexandros at Whampoa in July 1968.	Built by California Shipbuilding as Stephen Johnson Field for the USWSA; operated by CGT as Mortain in 1947; transferred to Cie. des Messageries Maritimes on 5 June 1948.	
Mostagenem	1921	1939-1942	Own	Cargo vessel	265.2 ft (bp) x 42.3 ft.	1,942	Damaged by air attack off Levanzo on 18 April 1943; sank next day.	Built by T. van Duijvendijk's Scheepswerf as Auguste Borremans for Rijnrerederei; acquired by CGT as Mostagenem in September 1939; seized by Italian forces on 18 December 1942.	
Mustapha Ben Ismail	1880	1880-1906	Own	Dragut type passenger/cargo vessel	183 ft. (bp) x 25.6 ft.	556	Broken up in 1906.	Built by Scotts.	—
Napoléon III	1865	1866-1873	Own	Ocean liner	363.3 ft. (bp) x 46.1 ft.	3,376	Sank after collision with Loch Earn whilst sailing the Atlantic on 22 November 1873.	Built by Thames Iron Works; R/n Ville du Havre in 1873.	
Napoléon	1959	1960-1969; 1969-1974	Own; Mgr	Ferry	356.5 ft. x 51.95 ft.	5,564	Broken up as Alpasha in 1988.	Built by FCM; transferred to CGTM in 1969; sold in 1974.	
Nemours	1930	1939-1942; 1946-1952	Own; Own	Cargo vessel	171.7 ft. (bp) x 27.2 ft.	673	Broken up as Ambro at Savonna in December 1968.	Built by N.V. Industrieele Mij. "De Noord" as Nijverdal for Technisach Bureau Gebrudder Voskamp; acquired by CGT as Nemours in April 1939; seized by US forces on 10 February 1942; returned in 1946; sold in 1952.	—
Neva	1958	1968-1969	Own	Cargo vessel	323 ft (oa) x 47.6 ft.	3,469	Arrived in tow at Santander as Lemmen on 17 July 1988; for break up.	Built by VEB Warnowwerft Warnemünde as Fenja Jan for J. Lauritzen A/S; acquired by CGT on 30 August 1968 and R/n Neva (training ship); sold in 1969.	—
Nevada	1915	1919-1922; 1922-1940	Opr; Own	Indiana type passenger/cargo vessel	402.2 ft (bp) x 56.2 ft.	5,693	Went aground between Cairns and the island of Coll as Nevada II on 19 July 1942.	Built by Bremer Vulkan as Rovuma for DOAL; ceded to France on 30 March 1919 and R/n Nevada (Operated by CGT); acquired by CGT in 1922; taken over by MOWT in June 1940.	—
Niagra	1908	1910-1931	Own	Passenger/cargo vessel	500 ft (oa), 485.2 ft. (bp) x 56 ft.	8,590	Broken up at Le Havre in March 1931.	Built by ACL as Corse for Cie des Chargeurs Réunis; acquired by CGT in February 1910 and R/n Niagra.	
Nina	1950	1950-1963	Own	Nina type cargo vessel	208.3 ft (oa) x 30.5 ft.	863	Laid up pending disposal as Agia Varvar in 1976; sold for break up.	Built by Chantiers et Ateliers Augustin Normand; sold in 1963.	—
Normandie	1883	1883-1911	Own	Ocean liner	459.3 ft. (bp) x 49.2 ft	6,283	Laid up in 1911; broken up at Bo'ness	Built by Barrow Shipbuilding, laid down as Ville de New York, launched as Normandie; R/n La Normandie in 1886.	—
Normandie	1935	1935-1941	Own	Ocean liner	1,029 ft (oa), 981.4 ft. (bp) x 117.9 ft.	83,423	Sold in October 1946; for break up.	Built by Chantiers et Ateliers de Saint‑Nazaire–Penhoët; taken over by the US Maritime Commission on 12 December 1941, never returned.	
Notre Dame de Fourvière	1921	—	—	—	—	—	—	refer Louisiane	—
Nouveau Monde	1865	1865-1905	Own	Washington type ocean liner	364 ft. (bp) x 44 ft.	3,200	Broken up at Genoa in 1905.	Built by Chantiers de l'Atlantique; R/n Labrador on 20 November 1875.	—
Oaklahoma	1917	1926-1929	Own	Grelfryda type cargo vessel	400.3 ft (bp) x 51.6 ft.	4,579	Caught fire and scuttled at Liverpool in 1929; refloated and condemned; for break up.	Built by John Readhead & Sons as Warkworth for R.S. Dalgleish; acquired by CGT in 1926 and R/n Oklahoma.	—
Ohio	1898	1915-1921; 1921-1934	Opr; Own	Cargo vessel	401.7 ft. (bp) x 49.2 ft.	4,697	Broken up in 1934.	Built by London & Glasgow as Needles for Clyde Shipping; sold as Harlem in 1915 via British India to US buyers and R/n Ohio, the sale was vetoed by the French Govt. and vessel was operated by CGT; acquired by CGT in 1921.	—
Oise	1919	1920-1929	Own	War Timiskaming type cargo vessel	251 ft. (bp) x 43.5 ft.	2,085	Sank in Bonhaim Strait as Kien Yuan on 27 January 1949.	Built by Polson Ironworks as War Timiskaming for the Shipping Controller; acquired by CGT in 1920 and R/n Oise; sold in 1929.	—
Olinde Rodrigues	1872	1878-1905	Own	Franconia type passenger/cargo vessel	350 ft. (bp) x 39 ft.	3,098	Sold on 25 August 1905; for break up at Cherbourg.	Built by Caird as Franconia for HAPAG; acquired by CGT on 12 April 1878 and R/n Olinde Rodrigues.	—
Ontario	1919	1919-1934	Own	Maryland type cargo vessel	472.2 ft. (oa) x 410.5 ft. (bp) x 54.1 ft.	5,476	Arrived in Japan as Marpesa in April 1954; for break up.	Built by J. Coughlin and Sons as War Company for the Shipping Controller; handed over to CGT in October 1919 and R/n Ontario; sold in 1934.	—
Orégon	1911	1917-1949	Own	Passenger/cargo vessel	325 ft. (bp) x 44 ft.	3,101	Broken up in 1949.	Built by James Laing & Sons as Rawson for Cia. Argentina de Nav.; acquired in 1917 and R/n Orégon; R/n Pologne in 1921; R/n Saint Domingue in 1932.	
Orégon	1929	1929-1940; 1944-1945; 1945-1950; 1950-1955; 1955-1955	Own; Opr; Own; Own; Own	Oregon type passenger/cargo vessel	473.4 ft (bp) x 61.2 ft.	7,706	Grounded and lost as Pacific Harmony in 1955.	Built by Bremer Vulcan; came under Allied control in 1940; returned to CGT in August 1944 under allied direction; under French Govt and CGT control in April 1945; transferred on bare boat charter to Messageries Maritimes on 27 July 1950; on her return after 1st sailing she was converted into hospital ship (Owners: Minstry of Marine); returned to CGT on 23 May 1955 and then sold.	
Orne	1918	1920-1930	own	War Timiskaming type cargo vessel	251 ft. (bp) x 43.7 ft.	2,139	Deleted from Lloyd's Register in 1956.	Built by British American Shipbuilding as War Weasel for the Shipping Controller	
Oudjda	1881	—	—	—	—	—	—	refer Ville de Marseille	
Ouezzan	1920	1928-1936	Own	Cargo vessel	211.8 ft (bp) x 34 ft.	1,095	Broken up as Macoris in 1958.	Built by N.V. Wilhelm Hemsoth as Helmo Hemsoth for W. Hemsoth; acquired by CGT as Gertrud Schunerman in 1928 and R/n Ouezzan; R/n Miranda in 1931; sold in 1936.	—
Panama	1866	1866-1908	Own	Washington type ocean liner	349.1 ft. (bp) x 42.7 ft.	3,400	Broken up as Canada in 1908.	Built by Chantiers de l'Atlantique; R/n Canada in 1875.	—
Paris	1921	1921-1939	Own	Ocean liner	735.4 ft (bp). x 85.3 ft.	34,569	Caught fire at Le Havre on 18 April 1939 and abandoned; wreck dismantled in 1947.	Built by Chantiers et Ateliers de Saint‑Nazaire–Penhoët.	
Pauillac	1891	1899-1899	Own	Cargo vessel	406.2 ft (bp) x 46.1 ft.	4,332	Disappeared without trace on 1 December 1899.	Built by Thomas Royden & Sons as Sedgemore for W. Johnston; acquired by CGT in 1899 and R/n Pauillac.	—
Pélican	1909	1919-1926	Own	Viking type whaler	101 ft. (bp) x 20 ft.	168	Out of service in 1946.	Built by Framnæs Mekaniske Værksted as Pélican for Hvalfangstselskapet Ocean; acquired by CGT in 1919; sold in 1926.	—
Pellerin de Latouche	1913	1923-1937	Own	Ocean liner	452.4 ft (bp) x 56.3 ft.	8,848	Broken up at Emden in 1937.	Built by Cantiere San Rocco as Marienbad for Österreichischer Lloyd; taken over by French Govt. in 1915 and R/n General Gallieni; transferred to CGT in 1923 and R/n Pellerin de Latouche.	
Penerf	1930	1937-1939; 1939-1940	Own; Mgr	Cargo vessel	278.6 ft. (bp) x 42.6 ft.	2,151	Torpedoed by a British submarine 5 miles east of Antibes on 14 April 1943.	Built by Napier and Miller as Penerf for Cie. Nantaise de Nav.à Vapeur; acquired by CGT in 1937; transferred to CGAM in 1939; came under Vichy France control in July 1940.	—
Pensylvanie	1917	1926-1934	Own	Grelfryda type cargo vessel	400 ft. (bp) x 52 ft.	4,521	Wrecked as Bury Hill at Almadi Reef on 7 December 1936.	Built by Richardson Duck as Cardigan to Cardigan Steamship; acquired by CGT in 1926 and R/n Pensylvanie; sold in 1934.	—
Penthièvre	1922	1937-1939; 1939-1940	Own; Mgr	Cargo vessel	288.1 ft (bp) x 43.6 ft.	2,382	Shelled and sunk by Britiish coastal batteries at Dover on 2 March 1943.	Built by Anciens Chantiers Dubigeon as Cybèle for Cie. Auxiliere de Nav.; acquired by CGT as Penthièvre in 1937; transferred to CGAM in 1939; came under Vichy France control in July 1940.	—
Péreire	1866	1866-1888	Own	Péreire type passenger/cargo vessel	345 ft. (bp) x 43.5 ft.	3,150	Left Adrossan as Lancing on 24 December 1924; for break up.	Built by Robert Napier and Sons; sold in 1888.	—
Pérou	1907	1908-1914	Own	Guadeloupe type passenger/cargo vessel	432.6 ft. (bp) x 52.3 ft.	6,599	Broken up in 1934.	Built by Chantiers et Ateliers de Saint‑Nazaire–Penhoët, laid down as Fort-de France, completed as Pérou.	—
Pérou	1951	—	—	Chili type cargo vessel	475.8 ft. (oa) x 61.5 ft.	6,919	Broken up as Encilla at Savonna in 1974.	Built by Burmeister and Wain, laid down as Pérou for CGT, launched as Indus for Messageries Maritimes.	—
Pérou	1951	1951-1967	Own	Equateur type cargo vessel	482.3 ft.(oa), 461.5 ft (bp) x 62.3 ft	7,264	At Kaohsiung as Eleistra VI on 7 May 1980; for break up.	Built by Forges et Chantiers de la Gironde; sold in 1967.	—
Petite Terre	1930	1933-1939	Mgr	Cargo vessel	256.8 ft. (bp) x 39.2 ft.	1,634	Sunk by a mine off Porquerolles as Prosper Schaiffino on 10 November 1945.	Built by Bergen Mekaniske Verksted as Donator for AS Senator; acquired by CGAM in 1933 and rn Petite Terre; sold in 1939.	—
Picardie	1865	1881-1883	Own	Passenger/cargo vessel	292.65 ft (bp) x 32.48 ft.	1,703	Sank off Newfoundland on 11 January 1883.	Built by James Laing & Sons as Albany for Diamond Steam Navigation; acquired by CGT as Picardie on 4 February 1881.	—
Picardie	1912	—	—	—	—	—	—	refer France	—
Pinta	1950	1950-1962	Own	Nina type cargo vessel	208.3 ft (oa) x 30.5 ft.	863	Final appearance in Lloyd's Register as Crystal I in 1980.	Built by Ateliers et Chantiers de Bretagne; sold in 1962.	—
Plouharnel	1943	1947-1949	Mgr	EC-2-S-C1 (Liberty) type cargo vessel	441.6 ft. (oa), 422.8 ft. (bp) x 57 ft.	7,176	Caught fire in the Red Sea on 14 June 1959 and returned to Nantes; towed to Aviles in November 1963; for break up.	Built by New England Shipbuilding as Robert Jourdan for the USWSA; acquired by French Govt. in 1947 and R/n Plouharnel (CGT as managers); transferred in 1949.	—
Point a Pitre	1907	—	—	—	—	—	—	refer Guadeloupe	—
Pointe Allegre	1969	1969-1979	Own	Pointe Allegre type general cargo / fruit carrier	459.1 ft. (bp) x 69 ft.	6,738	Caught fire as Hui Quan at Xingang on 14 January 1984; total loss.	Built by CNIM; sold in 1979.	—
Pointe des Colibris	1969	1969-1979	Own	Pointe Allegre type general cargo / fruit carrier	459.1 ft. (bp) x 69 ft.	6,738	Arrived at Liverpool as Montego Bay II on 6 June 1986; for break up.	Built by CNIM; sold in 1979.	—
Pointe la Rose	1974	1974-1977	Own	Pointe Sans Souci type cargo vessel	509.7 ft (bp) x 69.1 ft.	6,561	Arrived at Aliaga as Lincoln Universal on 2 November 1992; for break up.	Built by Dubigeon-Normandie SA; transferred to CGM on 1 March 1977.	—
Pointe Madame	1973	1973-1977	Own	Pointe Sans Souci type cargo vessel	509.7 ft (bp) x 69.1 ft.	6,561	Broken up at Alang as Gulf 1 in 1993.	Built by Dubigeon-Normandie SA; transferred to CGM on 1 March 1977.	—
Pointe Marin	1970	1970-1979	Own	Pointe Allegre type fruit carrier	459.1 ft (bp) x 69 ft.	6,738	Broken up at Haungpu as Yang Quan in June 1987.	Built by CNIM; sold in 1979.	—
Pointe sans Souci	1973	1973-1977	Own	Pointe Sans Souci type cargo vessel	509.7 ft (bp) x 69.1 ft.	6,561	Broken up at Alang as Star 1 in 1993.	Built by Dubigeon-Normandie SA; transferred to CGM on 1 March 1977.	—
Pologne	1911	—	—	—	—	—	—	refer Orégon	—
Pont l'Evêque	1945	1945-1960	Mgr	EC-2-S-C1 (Liberty) type cargo vessel	441.6 ft. (oa), 422.8 ft. (bp) x 57 ft.	7,176	Broken up in 1971.	Built by New England Shipbuilding as Ernest L. Dawson for USWSA; acquired by the French Govt. in 1945 and R/n Pont l'Evêque (CGT as managers); transferred in 1960.	—
Pont Audemer	1945	1945-1955	Opr	EC-2-S-C1 (Liberty) type cargo vessel	441.6 ft. (oa), 422.8 ft. (bp) x 57 ft.	7,176	Abandoned after an explosion enroute Marseilles-Abijan as Vesper on 13 December 1965; towed into Cartanega; broken up in May 1966.	Built by New England Shipbuilding as Harold H. Brown for the USWSA; delivered to the French Govt. and R/n Port Audemer (CGT as operators); transferred in 1955.	—
Pont en Bassin	1945	1945-1963	Mgr	EC-2-S-C1 (Liberty) type cargo vessel	441.6 ft. (oa), 422.8 ft. (bp) x 57 ft.	7,176	Broken up at Shanghai in 1968.	Built by New England Shipbuilding as William H. Lane for the USWSA; delivered to the French Govt. and R/n Port en Bassin (CGT as managers); transferred in 1963.	—
Précheur	1916	1921-1937	Own	Tug	66.03 ft. (bp) x 15.58 ft.	66	—	Built by Lytham St. Annes Shipbuilding as A.S. 104 for the War Office; acquired by CGT as René in 1921 and R/n Précheur; sold in 1937.	—
Président Dal Piaz	1929	1929-1940	Own	Passenger/cargo vessel	363 ft. (bp) x 52.8 ft.	4,866	Scuttled at Cassis on 26 June 1944; total loss.	Built by Swan Hunter and Wigham Richardson; seized by Italian forces in July 1940; returned to French control as Melfi in 1943; seized by German forces on 22 February 1943; returned to French control by the Germans on 15 February 1944, taken over by Italians and R/n Amalfi.	
Provence	1966	—	—	—	—	—	—	refer Comte de Nice	—
Provincia	1877	1880-1886	Own	Cargo vessel	271 ft.(bp) x 33.5 ft	1,696	Abandoned off Cape Villano on 18 November 1903.	Built by Austin & Hunter as Provincia for Cyprien Fabre; acquired by CGT in 1880; sold in 1886.	—
Puerto Rico	1913	1913-1940	Own	Puerto Rico type ocean liner	413 ft. (bp) x 51.4 ft.	6,179	Sunk by Schnellboots en route to Bordeaux on 24 July 1940.	Built by Chantiers et Ateliers de Saint‑Nazaire–Penhoët; R/n Meknès in 1929; requisitioned by the French Govt. in 1940.	
Québec	1896	1905-1917	Own	Minho type passenger/cargo vessel	345.7 ft. (bp) x 44.1 ft.	3,445	Struck mine laid by SM UC-21 at the mouth of the Gironde Estuary on 24 January 1917.	Built by Robert Napier and Sons as Ebro for Royal Mail Steam Packet; acquired as Québec in 1905.	—
Quercy	1938	1938-1939; 1939-1939; 1947-1955	Mgr; Own; Own	Quercy type banana carrier	315 ft (bp) x 45.5 ft	3,128	Sold and broken up as Artic Reefer in 1966.	Built by Burmeister & Wain for CGAM; transferred to CGT ownership in 1939; requsitioned in September 1939 (1939-1947); reverted to CGT in 1947; sold in October 1955.	—
République	1872	1882-1894	Own	Tug	140.5 ft. (bp) x 22.8 ft.	247	Converted into a pontoon in 1894.	Built by J. Eltringham as Alliance for United Steam Tug; acquired in by CGT 1882 and rn République;	—
Rochambeau	1911	1911-1934	Own	Ocean liner	559.4 ft. (bp) x 63.7 ft.	12,678	Broken up at Dunkirk in 1934.	Built by Chantiers et Ateliers de Saint‑Nazaire–Penhoët.	
Rochambeau	1967	1967-1977	Own	Suffren type container vessel	490.5 ft. (bp) x 68.5 ft.	9,848	Left Sharjah for Alang as Khalij Express on 6 September 1985; for break up	Built by Chantiers Navale de la Ciotat; sold in 1977.	
Rollon	1910	1916-1923	Own	Tug	98.5 ft. (bp) x 21.4 ft.	152	Taken by Germans forces in June 1940; to become a casualty of war.	Built by H.J. Koopman as Rollon for M. V.G. Levasseur & fils; acquired by CGT in 1916; sold in 1923.	—
Rouen	1942	1947-1953	Mgr	EC-2-S-C1 (Liberty) type cargo vessel	441.6 ft. (oa), 422.8 ft. (bp) x 57 ft.	7,176	Broken up at Kaohsiung as Gannet in May 1969	Built by California Shipbuilding as George G. Meade for USWSA; acquired by French Govt. in 1947 and R/n Rouen (CGT as managers); sold in 1953.	—
Rousillon	1906	1920-1931	Own	Feldherren-class ocean liner	462.1 ft. (bp) x 57.6 ft.	8,819	Withdrawn in August 1930; broken up at Pasajes in 1931.	Built by AG Weser as Goeben for NDL; ceded to France as war reparations in January 1919; passed to CGT in 1920 and R/n Rousillon.	
Roussillon	1966	1970-1976	Mgr	Passenger/car ferry	440.7 ft. (oa) x 66.2 ft.	7,659	Broken up at Aliaga as Queen Calliope in June 2002.	Built by OY Wartsila AB as Prins Hamlet for AB Bonnierföretagen; acquired by CGT in 1970 and R/n Roussillon (originally to be Languedoc) and immediately transferred to CGTM; transferred to SNCM in 1976.	—
Safi	1951	1951-1955	Mgr	Safi type livestock and wine carrier	269 ft. (oa) x 39.4 ft.	1,164	During the night of 2–3 November 1970 capsized at Beirut as Evita; abandoned to underwriters.	Built by Haarlemse Scheepsbouw Maatschappij for CGAM (CGT as managers); transferred in 1955 to subsidiary Cie. Générale Marocaine d’Armements.	—
Sahara	1950	1950-1953; 1953-1972	Mgr; Own	Atlas type bulk wine carrier	313 ft (oa) x 46 ft.	2,049	Broken up as Erakor at Auckland in October 1973.	Built by Ateliers and Chantiers de Provence, laid down as Aures, completed as Sahara for CGAM (CGT as managers); transferred to CGT in 1953 and R/n Seine; R/n Venta in 1962; sold in 1972.	—
Saint André	1912	1915-1936	Own	Saint André type cargo vessel	393.7 (bp) x 50.3 ft.	5,766	Broken up in 1936.	Built by ACL as Saint André for Cie. Navale de l'Oceanie; acquired by CGT on 6 November 1915.	—
Saint-Augustin	1880	1880-1913	Own	Moïse type passenger/cargo vessel	310 ft. (bp) x 33.6 ft.	1,854	Sprang a leak and sank off Bone in 1913.	Built by John Elder.	
Saint Aygulf	1920	1922-1937	Own	Carbet type cargo vessel	365 ft. (bp) x 49 ft.	3,744	Sunk by torpedo enroute Naples-Bizerta as Vernon in January 1943.	Built by Napier and Miller for Soc. Francaise d'Armement; acquired by CGT in 1922; R/n Carimaré in 1923; Meteorological ship 1937-1939; taken by Italian forces in 1940.	—
Saint Bertrand	1929	1946-1948	Mgr	Cargo vessel	446 ft. (bp) x 56.2 ft.	5,522	Laid up at Hiroshima as Senzan Maru on 13 September 1958; for break up.	Built by Bremer Vulkan as Chemnitz for NDL; rn Saint Bertrand by the Allies in June 1940; management taken over by CGT in 1946; sold in 1948.	
Saint Clair	1929	1934-1940	Mgr	Cargo vessel	347.5 ft. (bp) x 48.3 ft.	3,753	Torpedoed by U-67 as Saint Clair II 400 miles SW of Madeira on 24 September 1941.	Built by Swan Hunter and Wigham Richardson for Soc. Francaise d'Armements; acquired by CGAM (CGT as managers); taken over by the MOWT in July 1940.	—
Saint Clair	1949	1949-1967	Mgr	Saint Clair type cargo vessel	372.4 ft. (oa) x 51 ft.	3,812	Broken up as Almar II in September 1978.	Built by Chantiers Navale de la Ciotat for CGAM (CGT managers); sold in 1967.	—
Saint Domingue	1879	1879-1918	Own	Saint Domingue type passenger/cargo vessel	228.6 ft. (bp) x 29.8 ft.	1,048	Broken up at Brest as Georges Faustin in 1923.	Built by FCM; sold in 1918.	—
Saint Domingue	1911	—	—	—	—	—	—	refer Orégon	—
Saint Ferréol	1904	1934-1935	Mgr	Cargo vessel	315.4 ft. (bp) x 43.1 ft.	2,760	Broken up in Italy in 1935.	Built by Swan Hunter and Wigham Richardson as Cayo Domingo for Cuban Steamship; acquired by CGAM as Saint Ferréol in 1934 (CGT as Managers).	—
Saint Ferréol	1951	1951-1969	Mgr	Saint Clair type cargo vessel	372.4 ft. (oa) x 51 ft.	3,812	Broken up as Ibn Sina in June 1979.	Built by Chantiers Navale de la Ciotat for CGAM; sold in 1969.	—
Saint-Germain	1874	1876-1907	Own	Passenger/cargo vessel	375.1 ft. (bp) x 40 ft.	3,251	Broken up at Glasgow in 1907.	Built by J & G Thomson as Klopstock for Adler Line; acquired by CGT in 1876 and R/n Saint Germain.	—
Saint Jean	1913	1915-1934	Own	Saint André type cargo vessel	397.9 ft. (bp) x 50.3 ft.	5,766	Sold in 1934; for break up.	Built by ACL as Saint André for Cie. Navale de l'Oceanie; acquired by CGT on 6 November 1915.	—
Saint Joseph	1912	1915-1934	Own	Saint André type cargo vessel	397.9 ft. (bp) x 50.3 ft.	5,797	Broken up in 1934.	Built by ACL as Saint Joseph for Cie. Navale de l'Oceanie; acquired by CGT on 6 November 1915.	—
Saint-Laurent	1866	1866-1902	Own	Ocean liner	355 ft, (bp) x 29 ft.	3,413	Broken up at Genoa in 1902.	Built by Chantiers de l'Atlantique.	—
Saint-Laurent	1905	1905-1916	Own	Hudson type passenger/cargo vessel	390.4 ft (bp) x 50.7 ft.	5,607	Caught fire at Malta on 2 February 1917 when in use as an ammunition carrier; towed clear of port and sunk.	Built by Chantiers de Normandie; requisitioned by the French Govt. on 31 August 1916.	—
Saint Laurent du Maroni	1907	1937-1951	Own	Cargo vessel	127.6 ft. (bp) x 23.9 ft.	344	Broken up in 1951.	Built by Marstal Shipbuilding and Repair Works as Thor II for AD Thor; acquired by CGT as Kolda in 1937 and R/n Saint Laurent du Maroni.	—
Saint Lo	1943	1947-1963	Mgr	EC-2-S-C1 (Liberty) type cargo vessel	441.6 ft. (oa), 422.8 ft. (bp) x 57 ft.	7,176	Broken up as Glee at Shanghai in July 1969.	Built by Oregon Shipbuilding as James Buchanan for the USWSA; acquired by France in 1947 and R/n Saint Lo; sold in 1963. (Note: Middlemiss does not specify the operator for this vessel; however, as she appears in his CGT list, the editor has followed the convention used for other Liberty ships and assigned CGT as manager during the French Government ownership period.)	—
Saint-Louis	1880	—	—	—	—	—	—	refer Isaac-Pereire	—
Saint Louis	1913	1916-1934	Own	Saint André type cargo vessel	398 ft. (bp) x 50.3 ft.	5,818	Broken up in 1934.	Built by ACL for Cie. Navale de l'Oceanie; acquired by CGT in 1916.	—
Saint Malo	1906	1906-1915	Own	Saint Malo type cargo vessel	232.6 ft. (bp) x 33.2 ft.	1,243	Lost as a casualty of war in 1915.	Built by Ateliers and Chantiers de Provence.	—
Saint Malo	1917	1939-1940	Own	Cargo vessel	385.3 ft. (bp) x 51.2 ft.	5,779	Torpedoed by U-101 off Rockall on 12 October 1940.	Built by Kawasaki Dockyard as War Wolf for the Shipping Controller; acquired by CGT as Saint Malo in September 1939; taken over by the Canadian Govt. at Sydney, Nova Scotia on 9 August 1940.	—
Saint Malo	1943	1947-1949; 1949-1950; 1950-1963	Mgr; Own; Mgr	EC-2-S-C1 (Liberty) type cargo vessel	441.6 ft. (oa), 422.8 ft. (bp) x 57 ft.	7,244	Grounded as Teagan below Sister Rocks on 28 November 1966; wreck abandoned.	Built by Todd Houston Shipbuilding as James W. Fannin for the USWSA; acquired by France in 1947 and R/n Saint Malo (CGT as managers); acquired by CGT in 1949; transferred to CGAM in 1950; sold in 1963.	—
Saint Marc	1913	1915-1916	Own	Saint André type cargo vessel	398.1 ft (bp) x 50.3 ft.	5,818	Captured and sunk by gunfire from SM U-38 58 miles SE of Malta on 5 September 1916.	Built by ACL for Cie. Navale de l'Oceanie; acquired by CGT on 6 November 1915.	—
Saint Marcouf	1945	1947-1950	Mgr	EC-2-S-C1 (Liberty) type cargo vessel	441.6 ft. (oa), 422.8 ft. (bp) x 57 ft.	7,244	Grounded near Barcelona as Seacrest; on 5 June 1963; refloated and towed to La Spezia; for break up.	Built by New England Shipbuilding as John R. Gordon for USWSA: acquired by French Govt in 1947, and R/n Saint Marcouf (CGT as managers); transferred on 29 June 1950.	—
Saint-Raphaël	1908	1920-1935	Own	Passenger /cargo vessel	250.5 ft. (bp) x 38.2 ft.	1,715	Broken up in 1935.	Built by Wood, Skinner as Flora for Schill, Seebhom; acquired by CGT in 1920 and R/n Saint-Raphaël.	—
Saint Raphaël	1958	1958-1972; 1972-1973	Mgr; Own	General cargo vessel (with bulk wine tanks)	385.7 ft (oa) x 52.9 ft.	3,610	Broken up as Drepanon in 1980.	Built by Ateliers et Chantiers de Bretagne for CGAM (CGT as managers); taken over by CGT in 1972; transferred to CGM on 21 December 1973.	—
Saint Servan	1906	1906-1934	Own	Saint Malo type cargo vessel	232.6 ft (bp) x 33.2 ft.	1,243	Broken up in 1934.	Built by Ateliers and Chantiers de Provence.	—
Saint-Simon	1874	1878-1905	Own	Franconia type passenger/cargo vessel	350 ft. (bp) x 39 ft.	3,090	Sold on 25 August 1905; for break up.	Built by Caird as Rhenania for HAPAG; acquired by CGT in 1878 and R/n Saint Simon.	—
Saint Tropez	1919	1934-1937	Mgr	War Timiskaming type cargo vessel	251 ft (bp) x 43.5 ft.	2,096	Sunk by air attack as Latymer off Cape Clear on 2 October 1940.	Built by Polson Ironworks as War Halton for the Shipping Controller; acquired by CGAM as Saint Tropez in 1934; sold in 1937.	—
Saint Valery	1943	—	—	—	—	—	—	refer Saint Valery en Caux	—
Saint Valery en Caux	1943	1947-1948	Mgr	EC-2-S-C1 (Liberty) type cargo vessel	441.6 ft. (oa), 422.8 ft. (bp) x 57 ft.	7,244	Broken up as Henriette at Hong Kong in August 1967.	Built by Oregon Shipbuilding as George W. Campbell for USWSA: acquired by French Govt in 1947, and R/n Saint Valery en Caux (for CGT); R/n Saint Valery in 1948; transferred on 19 May 1948. (Note: Middlemiss does not specify CGT’s exact role during the French Government ownership period; however, as the vessel is described as renamed “for CGT”, the editor has inferred a managerial role consistent with other EC‑2‑S‑C1 vessels of the era.)	—
Sainte Adresse	1908	1908-1934	Own	Depot supply collier	312 ft. (bp) x 44 ft.	3,056	Sold and broken up on 29 April 1934.	Built by Chantiers de Normandie.	—
Sainte Maxime	1911	1934-1940; 1940-1942	Mgr; Mgr	Cargo vessel	337.7 ft. (bp) x 48.2 ft.	2,860	Sunk in a collision enroute Naples-Bizerta on 13 January 1944.	Built by AG Weser as Parnassos for Deutsche Levante-Linie; acquired by CGAM in 1934 (CGT as managers); seized by German forces on 5 August 1940; reverted to owners in November 1940; seized by the Allies on 8 November 1942.	—
Sainte Maxime	1950	1950-1972	Mgr	Saint Clair type cargo vessel	372.4 ft. (oa) x 51 ft.	3,827	Broken up at Gadani Beach as Lilli commencing 3 November 1978.	Built by Chantiers Navale de la Ciotat for CGAM; sold in 1972.	—
Sainte Mere Eglaise	1942	1947-1948	Mgr	EC-2-S-C1 (Liberty) type cargo vessel	441.6 ft. (oa), 422.8 ft. (bp) x 57 ft.	7,176	Broken up at Kaohsiung as Margrethe Paulin in March 1968.	Built by Willamette Iron and Steel Works as Stephen Girard for the USWSA: acquired by French Govt. in 1947 and R/n Sainte Mere Eglaise (CGT as managers); transferred on 22 August 1948.	—
Salvador	1879	1879-1914	Own	Saint Domingue type passenger/cargo vessel	228.6 ft. (bp) x 29.8 ft.	1,056	Sold in 1914; for break up.	Built by FCM.	—
Sampiéro Corso	1936	1951-1967	Opr	Passenger/cargo vessel	345.5 ft. (bp) x 47.9 ft.	4,041 GRT	Broken up at Hong Kong in 1968.	Built by Ateliers and Chantiers de Provence for the French Govt.; CGT become operators in 1951; sold in 1967. (Note: Middlemiss notes that in July 1940 the vessel continued in Vichy service to Corsica, retaining full CGT livery with a large tricolour and its name painted prominently on the hull, in accordance with Vichy identification regulations. Although not operated by CGT at this time, the ship later entered CGT service in 1951.)	—
San Antonio	1930	1930-1942	Own	San Antonio type cargo vessel	431.5 ft. (bp) x 57.3 ft.	6,013	Bombed and sunk by Allied aircraft off Cape St Vito on 5 May 1943.	Built by Harland & Wolff; captured by German forces at Marseille on 21 December 1942.	
San Diego	1930	1930-1940	Own	San Antonio type cargo vessel	431.5 ft. (bp) x 57.3 ft.	6,013	Bombed and sunk by Allied aircraft enroute to Bizerta on 6 April 1943.	Built by Harland & Wolff; remained with Vichy France on 24 June 1940.	—
San Francisco	1930	1930-1940	Own	San Antonio type cargo vessel	431.5 ft. (bp) x 57.3 ft.	6,013	Bombed and sunk by Allied aircraft 35 miles W of Cape Corso on 14 July 1943.	Built by Harland & Wolff; remained with Vichy France on 24 June 1940.	—
San Jose	1931	1931-1940; 1946-1954	Own; Own	San Antonio type cargo vessel	431.5 ft. (bp) x 57.3 ft.	6,013	Broken up in 1957.	Built by Harland & Wolff; remained in Allied hands in June 1940; returned to service in 1946; sold in 1954.	—
San Mateo	1931	1931-1940; 1945-1954	Own; Own	San Antonio type cargo vessel	431.5 ft. (bp) x 57.3 ft.	5,947	Ran aground and sank in 1954	Built by Harland & Wolff; captured by German forces on 24 June 1940; returned to the French Govt. as Landungs Flotilla 11 on 29 June 1945 and R/n San Mateo; sold in 1954.	
San Pedro	1930	1931-1940; 1948-1953	Own; Own	San Antonio type cargo vessel	431.5 ft. (bp) x 57.3 ft.	5,947	Scrapped in 1959.	Built by Harland & Wolff; remained with Vichy France in June 1940; sunk at Marseilles in August 1944, raised; rebuilt in 1948; sold in 1953.	—
Savoie	1906	1940-1942	Own	Ocean liner	513.4 ft. (bp) x 60.5 ft.	11,537	Sunk at Casablanca by Allied forces on 8 November 1942.	Built by Workman Clarke as Araguya for Royal Mail Steam Packet; acquired by the French Govt. for CGT in January 1940 and R/n Savoie. (Note: Middlemiss states that the vessel was acquired by the French Government “for CGT” to replace CGT’s lost Bretagne, but does not clarify the legal status of ownership during wartime requisition. In the absence of explicit detail, the table records the period 1940–1942 under CGT ownership.)	—
Sein	1943	1947-1967	Mgr	EC-2-S-C1 (Liberty) type cargo vessel	441.6 ft. (oa), 422.8 ft. (bp) x 57 ft.	7,244	Broken up as Fede in 1971.	Built by North Carolina Shipbuilding as James Moore for USWSA: acquired by French Govt in 1947, and R/n Sein (CGT as managers); sold in 1967.	—
Seine	1950	—	—	—	—	—	—	refer Sahara	—
Sénegambie	1902	1916-1918	Own	Collier	247.5 ft. (bp) x 35.1 ft.	1,612	Stranded in 1918.	Built by Établissement de la Brosse et Fouché for P. Buhan; acquired by CGT in 1916.	—
Sèvre	1920	1937-1940; 1946-1948	Own; Own	Cargo vessel	365 ft. (bp) x 49 ft.	3,689	Broken up in 1948.	Built by Napier and Miller for Cie. Nantaise de Nav. à Vapeur; acquired by CGT in 1937; Remained in French hands, taken by Germans in 1940; returned to CGT in 1946.	—
Sibelius	1972			Grieg type RoRo cargo vessel	453.6 ft. (oa) x 65.8 ft.	3,990	Arrived at Gadani Beach as Sea Dolphin on 9 December 1985; for break up.	Built by AB Finnboda Varf for Cie. Générale Transbaltique; sold in 1987.	—
Sonora	1863	1865-1878	Own	Passenger/cargo vessel	180.4 ft. (bp) x 23 ft.	425	Hulked in 1916.	Built by Barclay Curle as Anglia for Leith, Hull & Hamburg S.P.; acquired by CGT in 1865 and R/n Sonora; sold in 1878.	—
Sonora	1912	1921-1934	Own	Cargo vessel	388.7 ft. (bp) x 54.1 ft.	4,745	Broken up in Spain as Castillo Manzaneres in 1965.	Built by J.L. Thompson as Northern for Centuary Shipping; acquired by CGT in 1921 and R/n Sonora; sold in 1934.	—
Suffren	1902	—	—	—	—	—	—	refer Leopoldina	
Suffren	1924	—	—	—	—	—	—	refer De Grasse	—
Suffren	1966	1966-1977	Own	Suffren type cargo vessel	490.5 ft. (bp) x 68.5 ft.	9,848	Left Sharjah for Alang for break up as Khalij Express on 6 September 1985; demolition commenced on 19 January 1986.	Built by Chantiers de l'Atlantique; sold in 1977.	—
Suzanne	1909	1909-1937	Own	Tug	77.7 ft (bp) x 18.9 ft.	78	Reported as an unrecorded casualty of war in 1945.	Built by J. Kievits; sold in 1937.	—
Tampico	1855	1862-1889	Own	Imperador type passenger/cargo vessel	265 ft. (bp) x 36.5 ft.	1,700	Foundered in the North Sea as Sorrento in August 1890.	Built by Laird Brothers as Imperador for South American & General; acquired by CGT in 1862 and R/n Tampico; R/n Guadeloupe in 1970; sold in 1889.	—
Taza	1904	1917-1933	Own	Cargo vessel	205 ft (bp) x 33.7 ft.	641	Broken up as Saint Thérèse in 1952.	Built by Greenock & Grangemouth Dockyard as Chile for Cia. Argentina de Nav.; acquired by CGT in 1917 and R/n Taza; sold in 1933.	—
Texas	1909	1909-1934	Own	Floride type passenger/cargo vessel	410.5 ft. (bp) x 52.3 ft.	6,674	Broken up in 1931.	Built by Chantiers de l'Atlantique.	—
Timgad	1911	1911-1914; 1920-1939	Own; Own	Carthage type passenger/cargo vessel	403 ft. (bp) x 51.3 ft.	5,601	Broken up at Ghent in February 1939.	Built by Ateliers and Chantiers de Provence; requisitioned by the French Govt. on 13 December 1914; returned to CGT on 16 July 1920.	—
Titan	1889	1894-1930	Own	Tender	145.7 ft. (bp) x 25.6 ft.	357	Laid up in 1929; broken up in 1930.	Built by Laird Brothers as Cambria for London & North Western; acquired by CGT in 1893 and R/n Titan.	—
Troarn	1943	1947-1965	Opr	EC-2-S-C1 (Liberty) type cargo vessel	441.6 ft. (oa), 422.8 ft. (bp) x 57 ft.	7,191	Broken up in 1972.	Built by Delta Shipbuilding as Robert M. La Follette for the USWSA; acquired by French Govt. in 1947 and R/n Troarn (CGT as operators); sold in 1965.	—
Trois Ilets	1920	1927-1953	Own	Cargo vessel	139 ft. (bp) x 22.5 ft.	338	Broken up in 1953.	Built by Schiffs-und Dockbauwerft Flender as Orontes for HAPAG; acquired by CGT in 1927 and R/n Trois Ilets.	—
Trun	1943	1947-1961	Mgr	EC-2-S-C1 (Liberty) type cargo vessel	441.6 ft. (oa), 422.8 ft. (bp) x 57 ft.	7,176	Broken up at Yokohama as Armonia in October 1968.	Built by California Shipbuilding as Meyer Lissner for USWSA; acquired by the French Govt in 1947 and R/n Trun (CGT as managers); sold in 1961.	—
Ursus	1917	1922-1945	Own	Tug	141.8 ft (bp) x 29.1 ft.	472	Declared in 1947 as a casualty of war in German hands.	Built by Bow, McLachan as Cynic for the Admiralty; acquired by CGT in 1922 and R/n Ursus. (Note: Middlemiss records that Ursus was in German hands during the war but does not provide the date or circumstances of seizure. The 1947 declaration is a postwar administrative act confirming wartime loss rather than the date of the event itself. As no seizure date is documented, CGT ownership is carried through to 1945 as the latest possible operational year.)	—
Ursus	1951	1951-1957	Own	Tug	120.9 ft (oa) x 26.9 ft.	296	Still in service as Manfredonia in 1996.	Built by Anciens Chantiers Dubigeon; sold in 1957.	—
Utah	1917	1925-1926	Own	Grelfryda type cargo vessel	375.2 ft. (bp) x 51.2 ft.	4,976	Wrecked at Punta San Juan on 11 September 1926.	Built by Northumberland Shipbuilding as Grelfryda for Griffiths Lewis Steam Navigation; acquired by CGT as Utah in 1925.	—
Valognes	1944	1946-1954	Opr	EC-2-S-C1 (Liberty) type cargo vessel	441.6 ft. (oa), 422.8 ft. (bp) x 57 ft.	7,176	Broken up at Savona as Richetto Parodi in 1966.	Built by California Shipbuilding as Hart Crane for USWSA; acquired by French Govt. on 26 May 1946 and R/n Valognes (CGT as operators); sold in 1954.	—
Vannes	1919	1940-1940; 1945-1948; 1948-1950	Mgr; Mgr; Own	EFC Design 1020 cargo vessel	251 ft. (bp) x 43.7 ft.	2,609	Broken up as Aristalex in 1954.	Built by McDougall Duluth Shipbuilding Company as Lake Flatonia for the USSB; acquired by France in 1940 and R/n Vannes (CGT as managers); recovered from Allied pool of French ships in 1945 and returned to CGT; acquired by CGT in 1948; sold in 1950. (Note: Middlemiss records CGT as managers at the 1940 renaming and notes that the vessel was “returned to CGT” after recovery from the Allied pool in 1945. He does not state when CGT lost control during the war, nor who operated the vessel while it was in the pool. As this information is not provided, no inference is made regarding CGT involvement between 1940 and 1945.)	—
Vauclin	1901	1920-1934	Own	Cargo vessel	365.3 ft. (bp) x 48.1 ft.	4,404	Broken up in 1934.	Built by Robert Duncan as Afton for McLaren & McClaren; acquired by CGT as La Marne in 1920 and R/n Vauclin.	—
Vaucluse	1906	1915-1934	Own	Cargo vessel	232 ft (bp) x 35.5 ft.	1,480	Broken up in 1934.	Built by Framnæs Mekaniske Værksted as Skjalm for Otto Thorenson; acquired by CGT as Rhea in 1915 and R/n Vaucluse.	—
Vendée	1881	1916-1918	Own	Cargo vessel	212.6 ft (bp) x 30.5 ft.	892	Torpedoed by SM UB-103 16 miles SW of the entrance to Gironde Estuary on 14 July 1918..	Built by Murdoch & Murray as Corsican for John MacFarlanee; acquired by CGT as Elenie in August 1916 and R/n Vendée.	—
Vénézuela	1876	1876-1911	Own	Cargo vessel	210.3 ft. (bp) x 29.4 ft.	955	Broken up in 1911.	Built by FCM.	—
Vénézuela	1905	1912-1920	Own	Ocean liner	394.3 ft. (bp) x 47.8 ft.	5,025	Foundered off Casablanca on 7 March 1920; sank on 5 October 1920.	Built by Cantieri Liguria Odero as Brasile for La Veloce de Nav. Italiana a Vapori; acquired by CGT in 1912 and R/n Vénézuela.	
Venta	1950	—	—	—	—	—	—	refer Sahara	—
Vera Cruz	1854	1862-1892	Own	Imperador type passenger/cargo vessel	265 ft. (bp) x 36.5 ft.	1,700	Broken up at Glasgow in 1892.	Built by Laird Brothers as Imperatriz for South American & General; acquired by CGT in 1862; R/n Martinique in 1869.	—
Vermont	1919	1921-1939	Own	Cargo vessel	399.6 (ft) x 52.3 ft.	5,128	Captured by U-37 and sunk by explosives on 15 October 1939.	Built by Bartram & Sons as Easterly for Sir R. Mathias; acquired by CGT in 1921 and R/n Vermont.	—
Versailles	1883	1889-1914	Own	Passenger/cargo vessel	378.8 ft (bp) x 45.3 ft.	4,247	Broken up at Genoa in 1914.	Built by J & G Thomson as Hammonia for HAPAG; acquired by CGT in December 1889 and R/n Versailles.	
Ville d'Ajaccio	1929	1948-1960	Own	Cargo vessel	269 ft. (bp) x 41.1 ft.	2,444	Broken up in Hong Kong as Eastwind in 1961.	Built by Ateliers and Chantiers de Provence for Cie. de Navigation Frassinet; acquired by CGT on 1 May 1948; sold in 1960.	—
Ville d'Alger	1880	—	—	—	—	—	—	refer Kléber.	—
Ville d'Alger	1890	1890-1921	Own	Eugène Péreire type passenger/cargo vessel	334.6 ft. (bp) x 35.1 ft.	2,211	Hit Mole G and sank entering Marseille in 1921.	Built by Chantiers et Ateliers de Penhoët.	—
Ville d'Alger	1935	1935-1939; 1940-1943; 1945-1966	Own; Own; Own	Ville d'Alger type ocean liner	461.9 ft. (oa), 447.8 ft (bp) x 63.2 ft.	10,172	Sold as Poseidon in April 1969; for break up.	Built by Chantiers et Ateliers de Saint‑Nazaire–Penhoët; requisitioned by the French Govt (1939-1940); seized by German forces on 6 January 1943; returned to CGT on 4 November 1943; in use a German floating hotel in 1944; scuttled on 20 August 1944; raised and returned to CGT in 1945; sold in 1966. (Note: Middlemiss records multiple interruptions to the vessel’s wartime service (requisition, seizure, scuttling and salvage) but does not provide continuous date ranges for CGT operation between 1940 and 1945. As the extent and duration of CGT involvement during this period cannot be determined from the source, the table does not subdivide the wartime years.)	
Ville d'Oran	1880	1880-1921	Own	Abd el Kader type passenger/cargo vessel	309.7 ft. (bp) x 33.5 ft.	1,936	Broken up in Aug 1921.	Built by Wigham Richardson.	—
Ville d'Oran	1936	1936-1939; 1948-1954; 1954-1965	Opr; Opr; Own	Ocean liner	461.9 ft. (bp) x 63.2 ft.	10,172	Arrived in Trieste for break up as Olympos on 15 December 1969.	Built by Soc.Provençale de Constructions Navales for the French Govt. (Chartered to CGT); requisitioned by French Govt in September 1939; resumed service in 1941 (Vichy); requisitioned by Allies in January 1943; returned to CGT in 1948; acquired by CGT on 18 January 1954; sold in June 1965. (Note: Middlemiss notes several interruptions to the vessel’s wartime service, including French Government requisition, a period under Vichy control, and subsequent Allied requisition, but does not provide continuous date ranges for CGT operation between 1939 and 1948. As the extent and duration of CGT involvement during these years cannot be determined from the source, the table does not list any of the wartime period as under CGT control.)	—
Ville de Barcelone	1880	1880-1914	Own	Abd el Kader type passenger/cargo vessel	309 ft. (bp) x 33.5 ft.	1,861	Broken up in 1914.	Built by Caird.	—
Ville de Bône	1880	1880-1931	Own	Abd el Kader type passenger/cargo vessel	310.2 ft. (bp) x 33.5 ft.	1,937	Broken up in January 1931.	Built by Wigham Richardson.	—
Ville de Bordeaux	1871	1871-1899	Own	Ville de Bordeaux type passenger/cargo vessel	289.7 ft. (bp) x 41.3 ft.	2,670	Sold in 1899; for break up at Cherbourg.	Built by Chantiers de l'Ocean.	—
Ville de Bordeaux	1946	1956-1964	Own	Passenger vessel	420.9 ft. (oa) x 55.3 ft.	6,687	Arrived in Split as Nessebar on 25 December 1975; for break up.	Built by AB Linholmens Varv as Saga, completed by AB Gotaverken for Svenska Lloyd; acquired by CGT in 1956 and R/n Ville de Bordeaux; sold in 1964.	—
Ville de Brest	1871	1871-1899	Own	Ville de Bordeaux type passenger/cargo vessel	289.7 ft. (bp) x 41.3 ft.	2,676	Withdrawn and broken up in 1899.	Built by Chantiers de l'Ocean.	—
Ville de Madrid	1875	—	—	—	—	—	—	refer Ferdinand de Lesseps	—
Ville de Madrid	1881	1881-1921	Own	Abd el Kader type passenger/cargo vessel	308.7 ft.(bp) x 33.5 ft.	1,874	Broken up at Genoa in August 1921.	Built by A. & J. Inglis.	—
Ville de Marseille	1875	1879-1902	Own	Stad Haarlem type passenger/cargo vessel	350 ft. (bp) x 38.1 ft.	2,920	Broken up at Genoa on 12 June 1902.	Built by A. & J. Inglis as Stad Amstserdam for KNSM; acquired by CGT in 1879 and R/n Ville de Marseille.	—
Ville de Marseille	1951	1951-1969; 1969-1973	Own; Mgr	Ville de Marseille type passenger/cargo vessel	465.9 ft. (oa) x 63.9 ft.	9,576	Arrived in Bilbao on 12 June 1973; for break up.	Built by FCM; R/n Maroc in 1951; R/n Ville de Marseille in 1956; transferred to CGTM in 1969.	
Ville de Mexico	1959	1969-1975	Own	Ore carrier	539.4 ft. (oa) x 69 ft.	12,870	Left Karachi as Like One on 29 July 1984; for break up.	Built by Ateliers and Chantiers de Provence as Jacques d'Anglejan U.N.1 for Union Industrielle; acquired by CGT in 1969 and R/n Ville de Mexico; sold in 1975.	—
Ville de Montreal	1954	1954-1969	Mgr	Ville de Montreal type cargo vessel	257.95 ft. (oa) x 42.5 ft.	2,381	Drifted ashore as Cherry Maju at Karwar in 1980; abandoned.	Built by ADM for CGAM (CGT as managers); sold in 1969.	
Ville de Mostagenam	1890	1915-1915	Own	Cargo vessel	310 ft. (bp)x 41 ft.	2,648	Sunk by SM U-39 NE off Mostaganem on 9 September 1915.	Built by Stephens as Highland Chief for James Nelson; acquired as by CGT as Ville de Mostagenam in 1915.	—
Ville de Nantes	1884	1904-1926	Own	Cargo vessel	236.2 ft. (bp) x 33.1 ft.	1,336	Broken up in 1926.	Built by Flensburger S.G as Adler for NDL; acquired by CGT in 1904 and R/n Ville de Nantes.	—
Ville de Naples	1881	1881-1929	Own	Abd el Kader type passenger/cargo vessel	311.7 ft. (bp) x 33.5 ft.	1,879	Broken up at La Seyne in July 1929.	Built by A. & J. Inglis; R/n Oudjda in 1918.	—
Ville de New York	1883	—	—	—	—	—	—	refer Normandie	—
Ville de Paris	1866	1866-1888	Own	Péreire type passenger/cargo vessel	345 ft. (bp) x 43.5 ft.	3,150	Wrecked as H. Bischoff in the Elbe near Gluckstadt on 28 October 1900.	Built by Robert Napier and Sons; sold in 1888.	—
Ville de Québec	1955	1955-1969	Mgr	Ville de Montreal type cargo vessel	257.9 ft (oa) x 42.5 ft.	2,381	Sank off the coast of Albania as Suzy on 20 August 1972.	Built by Scheepswerf en Machinefabriek De Biesbosch for CGAM (CGT as managers); sold in 1969.	—
Ville de Rome	1881	1881-1898	Own	Abd el Kader type passenger/cargo vessel	311.7 ft. (bp) x 33.5 ft.	1,879	Wrecked at Cape Negro, Port Mahon on 22 March 1898.	Built by A. & J. Inglis.	—
Ville de Saint Nazaire	1871	1871-1897	Own	Ville de Bordeaux type passenger/cargo vessel	289.7 ft. (bp) x 41.3 ft.	2,676	Wrecked off Cape Hatteras on 6 March 1897.	Built by Chantiers de l'Ocean.	—
Ville de Sfax	1882	1906-1913	Own	Passenger/cargo vessel	260.6 ft. (bp) x 35.4 ft.	1,537	Wrecked near Columbia Point as Maule on 8 September 1928.	Built by Hall Russell as Dabulamanzi for J.T. Rennie; acquired by CGT as Ville de Sfax on 15 October 1906; sold on 5 January 1913.	—
Ville de Tanger	1880	1880-1910	Own	Saint Domingue type passenger/cargo vessel	234.9 ft. (bp) x 29.5 ft.	1,066	Reported out of service in and broken up in 1921.	Built by FCM.	—
Ville de Tunis	1884	1884-1923	Own	Passenger/cargo vessel	317 ft. (bp) x 34.6 ft.	1,966	Broken up in 1923.	Built by Chantiers et Ateliers de Penhoët.	—
Ville de Tunis	1952	1952-1967	Own	Ville de Marseille type passenger/cargo vessel	465.9 ft. (oa) x 63.9 ft.	9,226	Foundered as City of Athens NE of Formentera on 26 March 1980.	Built by Arsenal de Lorient; sold in 1967.	—
Ville du Havre	—	—	—	—	—	—	—	refer Napoléan III	—
Vire	1944	1947-1963	Mgr	EC-2-S-C1 (Liberty) type cargo vessel	441.6 ft. (oa), 422.8 ft. (bp) x 57 ft.	7,176	Broken up at Yokosuka as Apollonian in September 1969.	Built by California Shipbuilding as David A. Curry for the USWSA; acquired by the French Govt in 1947 and R/n Vire (CGT as managers); sold in 1963.	—
Virginie	1903	1907-1934	Own	Passenger/cargo vessel	358.2 ft. (bp) x 49.2 ft.	5,330	Broken up in Holland in 1934.	Built by FCM as Malou for Eugene Salles; acquired by CGT in 1907 and R/n Virginie.	—
Virginie	1948	—	Own	Washington type passenger/cargo vessel	515.7 ft. (bp) x 64 ft.	8,696		Built by Chantiers et Ateliers de Saint‑Nazaire–Penhoët, launched as Virginie for CGT, completed as Mékong for Messageries Maritimes.	—
Volubilis	1902	1920-1931	Own	Passenger/cargo vessel	386.1 ft. (bp) x 46.7 ft.	4,747	Sold in March 1931; for break up.	Built by William Beardmore as Empire for Eastern and Australian; acquired by CGT in June 1920 and R/n Volubilis. (Note: Vessel was operated by Red Funnel steamers, a CGT British subsidiary, between 1919 and 1920.)	
Washington	1864	1864-1899	Own	Washington type ocean liner	345 ft. x 43 ft.	3,204	Collided with swing bridge on 4 February 1899; sold in December 1899; for break up.	Built by Scotts; converted from paddle to screw steamer in 1871.	
Washington	1930	1930-1939; 1944-1954	Own; Own	Oregon type passenger/cargo vessel	493.6 ft. x 61.2 ft.	7,706	Broken up as Oceanic Reliance in 1959	Built by Bremer Vulkan; war requisition (1939-1944); returned to CGT in December 1944; sold on 27 May 1954.	
Washington	1949	1949-1968	Own	Washington type cargo vessel	515.7 ft. x 64 ft.	8,696	Left Hiroshima for Hsinkiang as Golden Summer on 28 January 1974; for break up.	Built by Chantiers et Ateliers de Saint‑Nazaire–Penhoët; construction commenced (no name stated) for HAPAG; acquired by CGT and launched in 1947; sold in September 1968.	
Wilfred	1891	1922-1926	Own	Cargo vessel	305.3 ft. (bp) x 41.5 ft.	3,005	Broken up in 1926.	Built by James Laing as Venango for Neptune Steam Navigation; acquired by CGT as Wilfred in 1922.	—
Winnipeg	1918	—	—	—	—	—	—	refer Jacques Cartier	—
Winnipeg	1950	1950-1976	Own	Washington type cargo vessel	515.7 ft. (bp) x 64 ft.	8,697	Broken up as Lambrose L. at Aliaga in 1982.	Built by Chantiers et Ateliers de Saint‑Nazaire–Penhoët; sold in 1976.	—
Winsconsin	1930	1930-1941; 1945-1951	Own; Own	Oregon type passenger/cargo vessel	473 4 ft. (bp) x 61.2 ft.	8,062	Sold for break up as Kapitan Maciejewiczby in May 1982.	Built by Bremer Vulkan; war requisition (1941-1945); returned to CGT on 13 November 1945; sold in 1951.	—
Wyoming	1930	1930-1943	Own	Oregon type passenger/cargo vessel	473.4 ft. (bp) x 61.2 ft.	8,062	Torpedoed by U-524 near the Azores on 15 March 1943.	Built by Bremer Vulkan.	—
Wyoming	1949	1949-1961	Own	Washington type cargo vessel	515.7 ft. (bp) x 64 ft.	8,639	Broken up at Kaohsiung as Seifu Maru in September 1974.	Built by ACL; sold in 1961.	—

== See also ==
- List of ocean liners
