= 1851 French coup d'état =

Coup d'état staged by Louis-Napoléon Bonaparte

Coup d'état of 2 December 1851
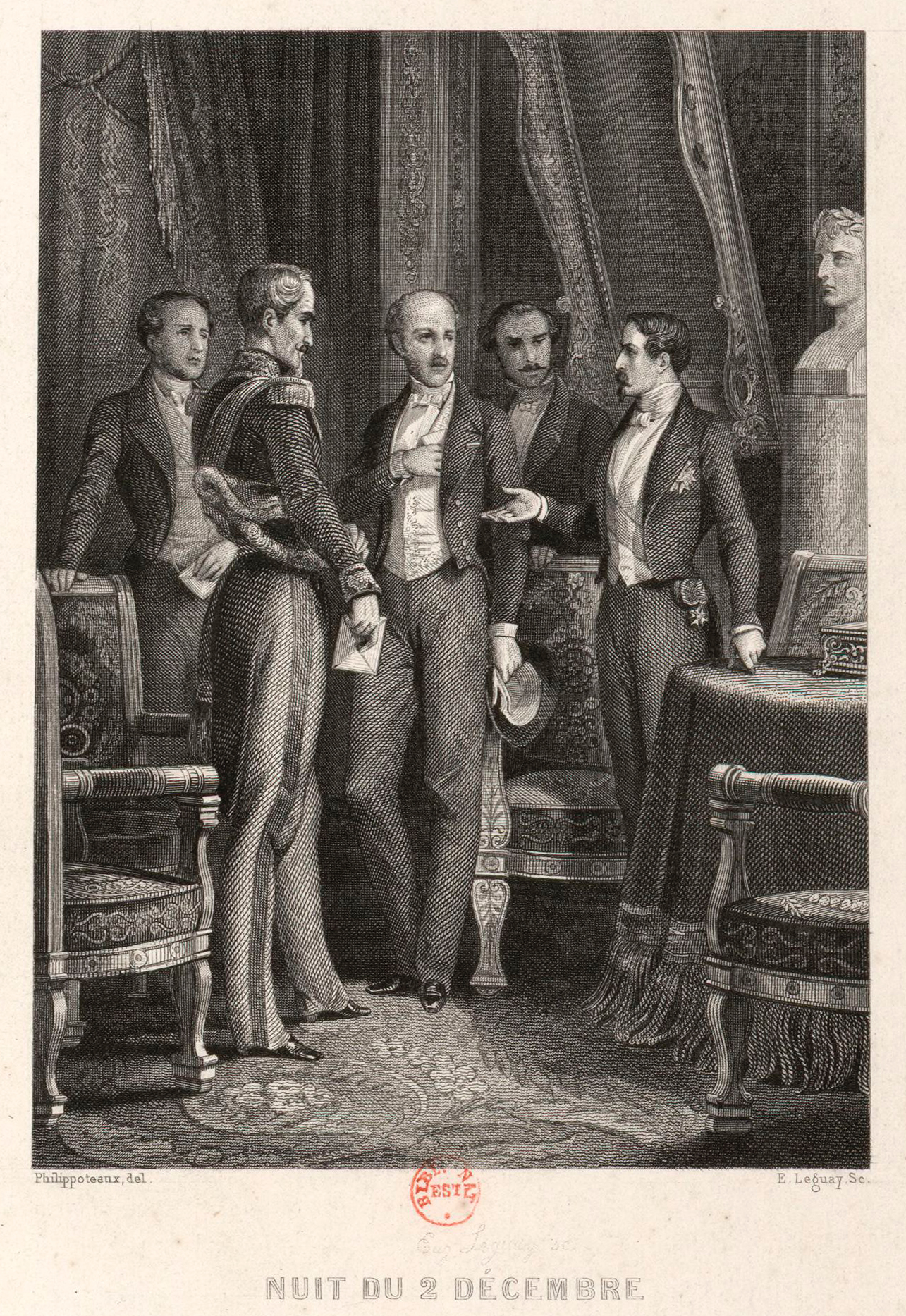
- Louis-Napoléon Bonaparte (right), with the bust of Napoleon I behind him, delivers instructions to his conspirators in the night of 1 to 2 December. Depicted, from left to right: Mocquard, Saint-Arnaud, Morny and Fialin. Drawing by Philippoteaux, engraved by E. Leguay and published in 1853
- Date: 2 December 1851
- Location: France
- Participants: Louis-Napoléon Bonaparte
- Outcome: Dissolution of the National Assembly; Authoritarian constitution enacted in January 1852; Downfall of the French Second Republic

Louis-Napoléon Bonaparte, at the time president of France under the Second Republic, staged a self-coup on 2 December 1851. Code-named Operation Rubicon and timed to coincide with the anniversary of his uncle Napoleon I's coronation and victory at Austerlitz, the coup dissolved the National Assembly, granted dictatorial powers to the president and preceded the establishment of the Second French Empire a year later.

Faced with the prospect of having to leave office in 1852, Louis-Napoléon Bonaparte staged the coup in order to stay in power and implement his reform programs; these included the restoration of universal male suffrage previously abolished by the legislature. The continuation of his authority and the power to produce a new constitution were approved days later by a constitutional referendum, resulting in the Constitution of 1852, which greatly increased the powers and the term length of the president. A year after the coup, Bonaparte proclaimed himself "Emperor of the French" under the regnal name Napoleon III.

== Causes ==
In 1848, Louis-Napoleon Bonaparte was elected President of France through universal male suffrage, taking 74% of the vote. He did this with the support of the Party of Order after running against Louis Eugène Cavaignac. Subsequently, he was in constant conflict with the members (députés) of the National Assembly.

Contrary to the Party's expectations that Louis-Napoleon would be easy to manipulate (Adolphe Thiers had called him a "cretin whom we will lead [by the nose]"), he proved himself an agile and cunning politician. He succeeded in imposing his choices and decisions upon the Assembly, which had once again become conservative in the aftermath of the June Days uprising in 1848. He broke away from the control of the Party of Order and created the Ministère des Commis, appointing General Hautpoul as its head, in 1849. On 3 January 1850, he dismissed Changarnier, a dissident in the Party of Order, thereby provoking an open conflict within the party. He also actively encouraged the creation of numerous anti-parliament newspapers and acquired the support of 150 members of Parliament, the "Parti de l'Elysée".

The provisions of the constitution that prohibited an incumbent president from seeking re-election appeared to force the end of Louis-Napoleon's rule in December 1852. He therefore spent the first half of 1851 trying to force changes to the constitution through Parliament so he could be re-elected. Bonaparte travelled through the provinces and organised petitions to rally popular support. Two-thirds of the General Council supported Louis-Napoleon's cause, but in the Assembly, supporters of the Duke of Orléans, led by Thiers, concluded an alliance with the far left to oppose Louis-Napoleon's plans. In January 1851, the Parliament voted no confidence in the Ministère des Commis. On 19 July, it refused the constitutional reform proposed by Louis-Napoleon, also scrapping universal male suffrage in an effort to break popular support for Bonaparte.

== Preparations for the coup ==
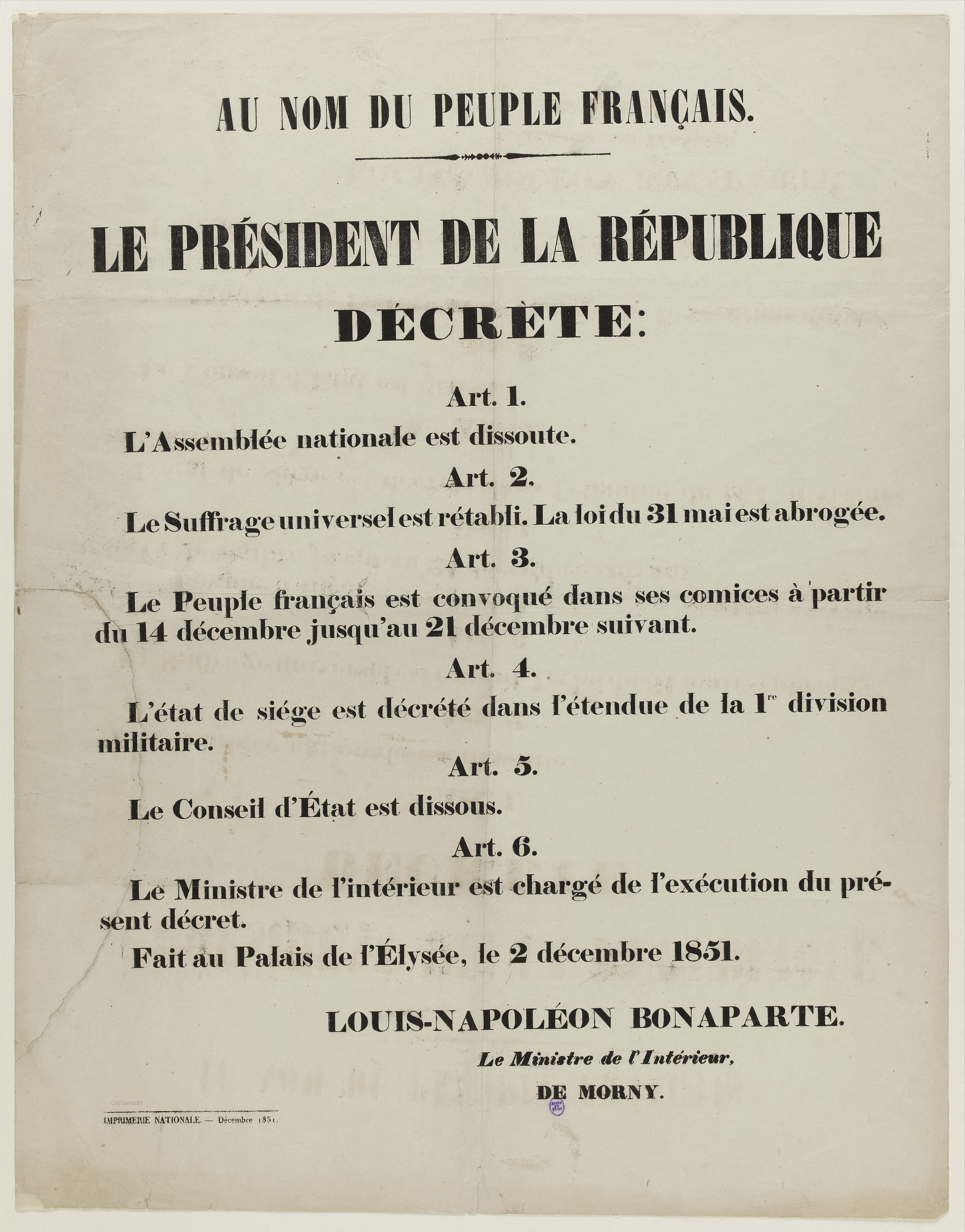
Proclamations of the decree issued by the president and executed by his Minister of the Interior, Charles de Morny, were placarded throughout Paris on 2 December.

The coup d'état was meticulously planned from 20 August 1851. Preparations and planning for this coup took place at Saint-Cloud. Among the conspirators were Jean-Gilbert Victor Fialin (a loyal companion of Louis-Napoléon), Charles de Morny (Louis-Napoléon's half-brother), and General Jacques Leroy de Saint Arnaud. On 14 October, Louis-Napoleon asked the Parliament to restore universal male suffrage but the request was turned down. His request for a reconsideration of the constitutional reform proposal was also turned down on 13 November. Prepared to strike, Louis-Napoleon appointed General Saint-Arnaud as the Minister of War and a circular was issued reminding soldiers of their pledge of "passive obedience". Followers of the President were appointed to various important positions: General Magnan as the Commander of the Troops of Paris, and Maupas, Prefect of Haute-Garonne as Prefect of Police of Paris. Convinced that the coup was now inevitable after the latest refusal, Louis-Napoleon fixed the anniversary of the coronation of Napoleon in 1804, and the victory at Austerlitz in 1805, as the day for the coup. The operation was christened Rubicon, in an allusion to Julius Caesar.

== The coup of 2 December 1851 ==
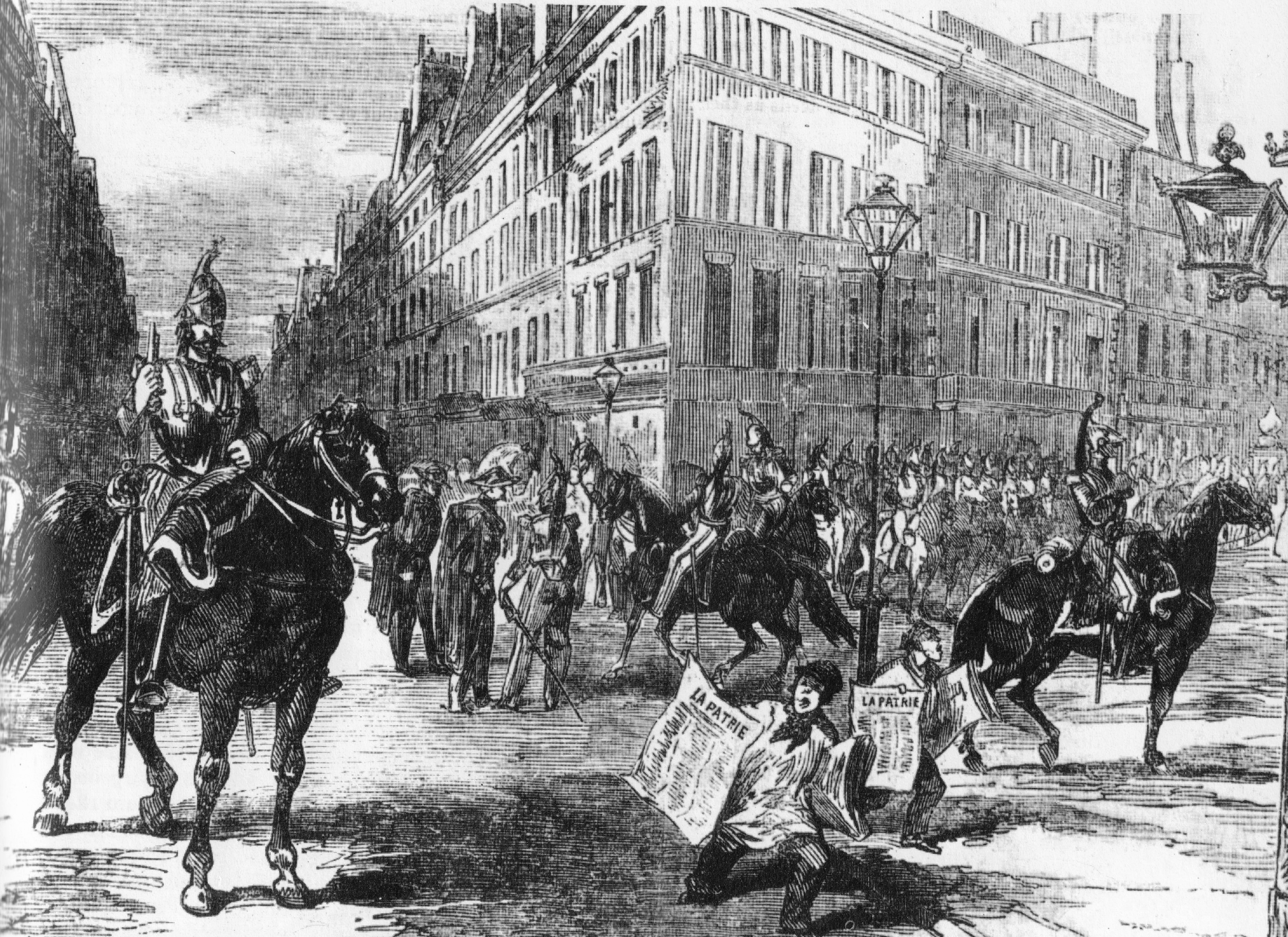
D'Allonville's cavalry in the streets of Paris during the coup d'état

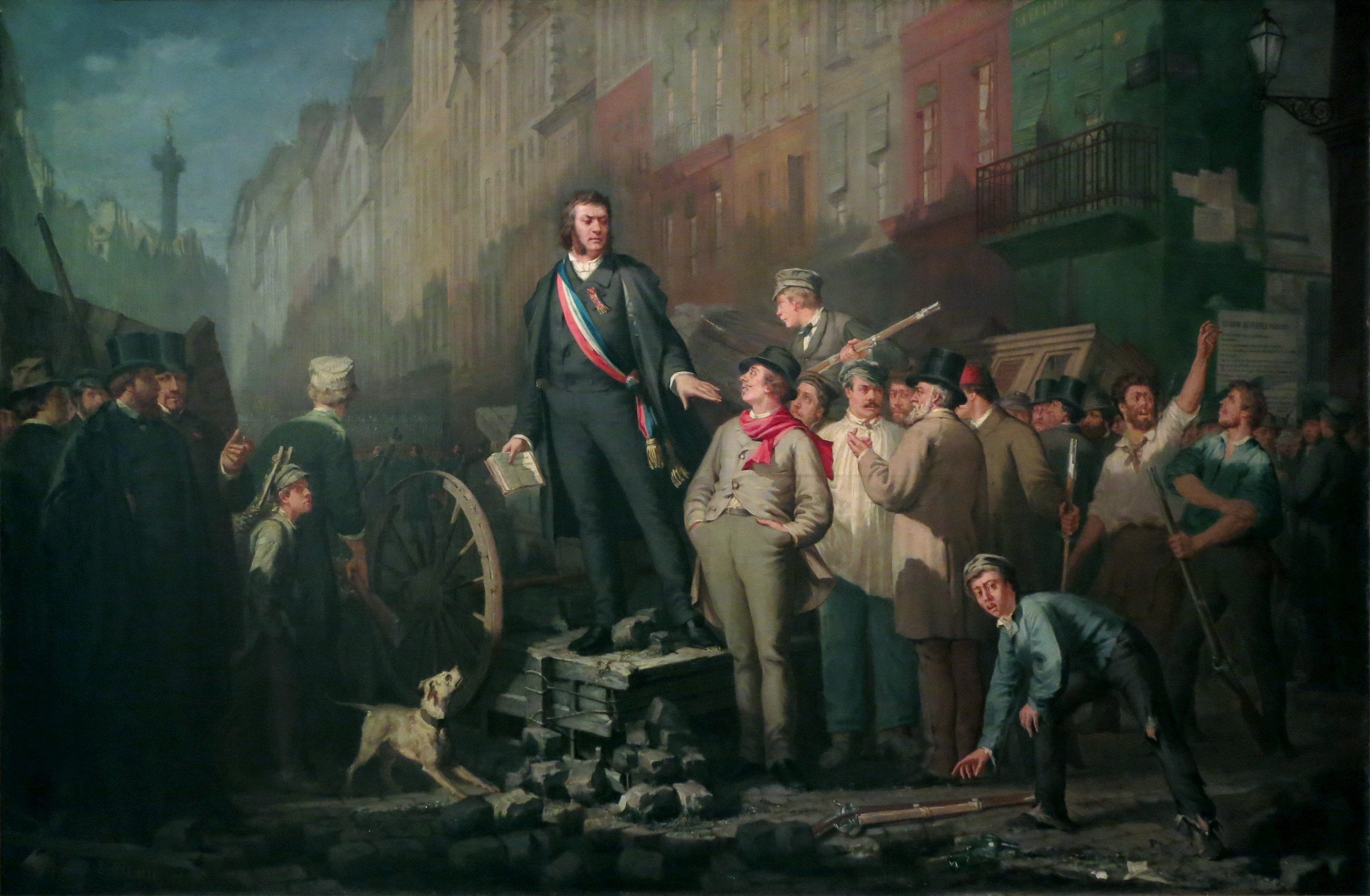
Montagnard deputy Jean-Baptiste Baudin in the barricades of Paris on 3 December, where he was killed by coup forces

On the morning of 2 December, troops led by Saint-Arnaud occupied strategic points in Paris, from the Champs-Élysées to the Tuileries. Top opposition leaders were arrested and six edicts promulgated to establish the rule of Louis-Napoleon. The National Assembly was dissolved, and universal male suffrage restored. Louis-Napoleon declared that a new constitution was being framed and said he intended to restore the "system established by the First Consul".

Reacting to this coup, parliamentarians took refuge in the mayor's office of the 20th arrondissement of Paris, and 220 of them voted to oust Louis-Napoleon from power. Most prominent among these were liberals like Remusat and moderates like Pascal Duprat, who were arrested soon after. A Parisian insurrection led by the likes of Victor Hugo and Victor Schoelcher erupted despite tight control by the army. The insurgents were soon defeated. On 3 December parliamentarian Jean-Baptiste Baudin was killed, and on 4 December 200 more people fell victim to the suppression of the revolt. The Italian journalist Ferdinando Petruccelli della Gattina was among the rebels and was expelled from France. By evening, the revolt of Paris was suppressed and the city returned to normal. According to Victor Hugo the killings which followed on 4 December were arbitrary and anybody visible to the soldiers was shot at or bayoneted including women and children.

== Revolt in other places ==
The coup triggered revolts in other places across France. On 5 December, rebellions were reported in big cities, small towns and rural areas in the south-west of France. The department of Basses-Alpes even declared itself administered by a "Committee of Resistance" but the army, still loyal to the President, succeeded in quelling the rebellion. A total of 32 departments were put under a state of alert from 8 December and the rebellious areas were controlled in a few days. Opponents were arrested and some were forced to flee. Victor Hugo fled to Brussels, then Jersey, and finally settled with his family on the Channel Island of Guernsey at Hauteville House, where he would live in exile until Napoleon III's downfall in 1870 and collapse of the regime during the Franco-Prussian War. By the end of the rebellion, 26,000 people were arrested, 9,530 were sent to Algeria and 250 to the prison of Cayenne.

== Peace returns and aftermath ==
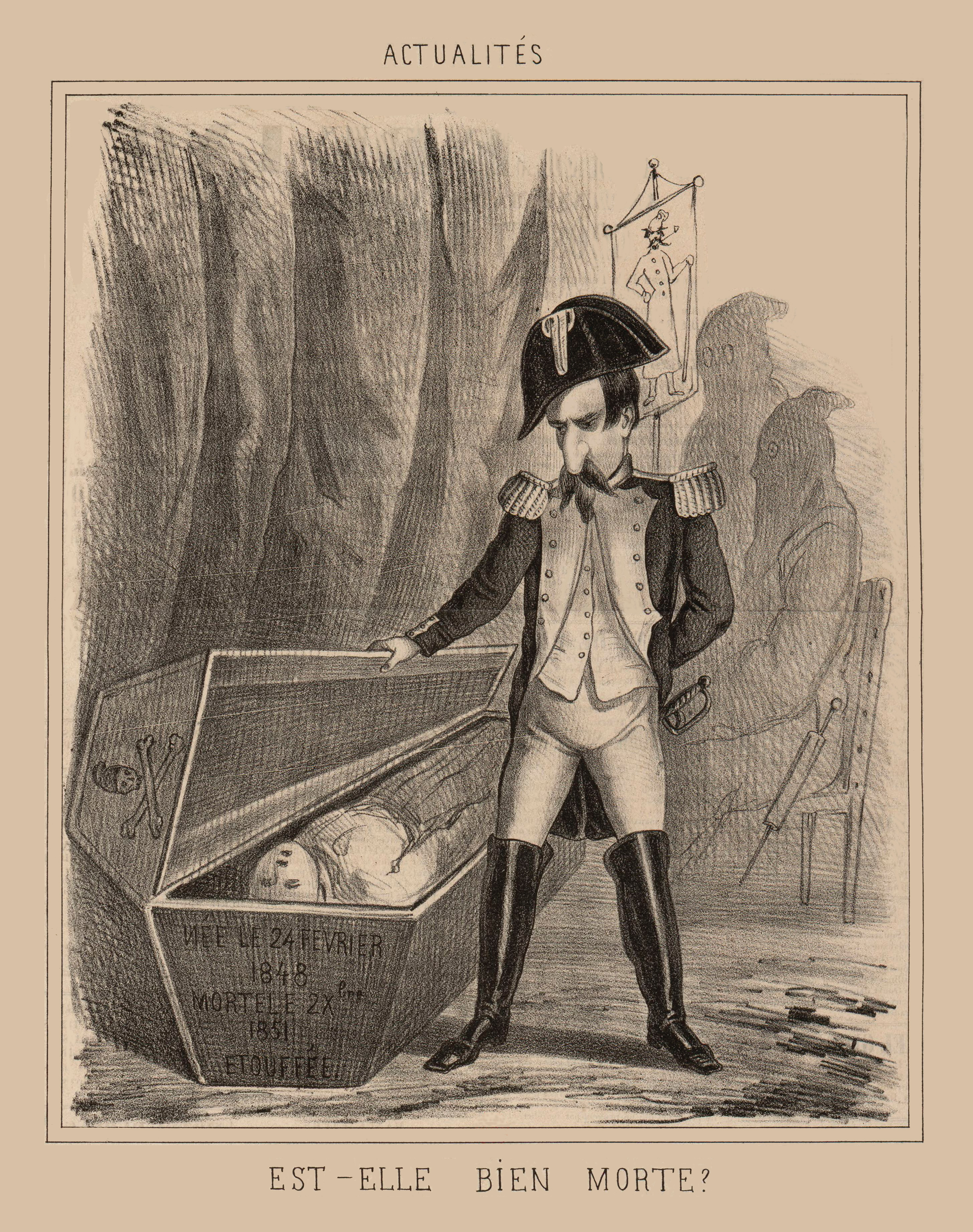
Parody of the painting Cromwell and Charles I by Delaroche, published in the Belgian edition of Le Charivari, showing Bonaparte looking at the corpse of the Republic after the coup, with the caption: Is she really dead?

The Bonapartists were finally assured of a victory. Generals Vaillant and Harispe became Marshals of France on 11 December. A new constitution was being drafted. A referendum was organised to ratify the new order and the coup was portrayed as a security operation. On 20 and 21 December, the French population were recorded as having voted for acceptance of the new regime by an overwhelming majority of 7,145,000 to 600,000, although the official tally and free nature of the vote were questioned by dissidents like Victor Hugo. Bonaparte now had the power to draft a new constitution.

Following a referendum in December 1851, a new constitution was adopted in January 1852. It dramatically expanded the powers of the president, who was elected for a period of 10 years with no term limits. He not only possessed executive power, but was vested with the power of legislative initiative, thereby reducing the scope of the Parliament. Bonaparte was automatically reelected to a fresh term as president. For all intents and purposes, he now held all governing power in the nation.

The authoritarian republic proved to be only a stopgap, as Bonaparte immediately set about restoring the Empire. In less than a year, following another referendum on 7 November 1852, the Second French Empire was proclaimed. Again on the symbolic and historic date of 2 December, President Louis-Napoléon Bonaparte became Napoleon III, Emperor of the French. The 1851 constitution concentrated so much power in Louis-Napoléon's hands that when the Empire was proclaimed, the only substantive changes to the document were to replace the word "president" with the word "emperor" and make the post hereditary.

== Bibliography ==
- Willette, Luc (1982). Le coup d'État du 2 décembre 1851:la résistance républicaine au coup d'État. Paris: Aubier. ISBN 2-7007-0285-9.
- Biermann, John (1988). Napoleon III and his carnival empire. New York: St. Martin's Press. ISBN 0312018274.
- Price, Roger (1994). A concise history of France. Cambridge: Cambridge University Press. ISBN 052136809X.
