= Constitution of 1852 =

The phrase Constitution of 1852 may refer to either of the following national constitutions:

- French Constitution of 1852, which inaugurated the Second Empire under Napoleon III
- 1852 Constitution of the Kingdom of Hawaii, under Kamehameha III
