= Secret ballot =

Anonymous voting method

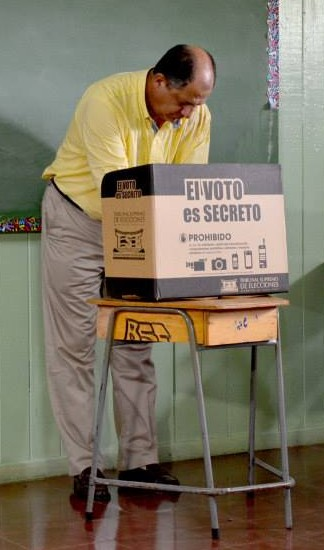
Presidential candidate Luis Guillermo Solís votes in the 2014 Costa Rican general election behind a privacy screen which says "The vote is secret"; Solís was elected president in the election

The secret ballot is a voting method in which a voter's identity in an election or a referendum is anonymous. This forestalls attempts to influence the voter by intimidation, blackmailing, and potential vote buying. This system is one means of achieving the goal of political privacy.

Secret ballots are used in conjunction with various voting systems. The most basic form of a secret ballot uses paper ballots upon which each voter marks their choices. Without revealing the votes, the voter folds the ballot paper in half (if necessary) and places it in a sealed box. This box is later emptied for counting. An aspect of secret voting is the provision of a voting booth to enable the voter to write on the ballot paper without others being able to see what is being written. Today, printed ballot papers are usually provided, with the names of the candidates or questions and respective check boxes. Provisions are made at the polling place for the voters to record their preferences in secret, and the ballots are designed to eliminate bias and prevent anyone from linking voters to the ballot.

In systems of direct democracy, such as the Swiss Landsgemeinde, voting is typically conducted publicly to ensure all citizens can observe the outcome.

== Secret vs. public methods ==
By the late 20th century, the secret ballot had become commonplace for individual electors in democracies.

Votes by elected officials are generally entitled to the same secrecy as other citizens when their capacity to vote derives from their status as citizens, such as at elections. However, votes in their public capacity as representatives are typically public, so citizens can judge officials' and former officials' voting records in future elections. This may be done with a physical or electronic system or through a roll call vote. Some faster legislative voting methods do not record who voted in which way, though witnesses in the legislative chambers may still notice a given legislator's vote. These include voice votes where the volume of shouting for or against is taken as a measure of numerical support and counting of raised hands. In some cases, a secret ballot is used to allow representatives to choose party leadership without fear of retaliation against those voting for losing candidates. The parliamentary tactics of forcing or avoiding a roll call vote can be used to discourage or encourage representatives to vote in a manner that is politically unpopular among constituents (for example, if a policy considered to be in the public interest is difficult to explain or unpopular but without a better alternative, or to hide pandering to a special interest) or to create or prevent fodder for political campaigns.

Public methods of citizen voting have included:

- Oral proclamation, where votes are shouted out one at a time, usually at an assembly
- Going to a particular area at an assembly, such as a town meeting or the Iowa caucus. This is the origin of the term poll for an election, originally meaning "top of the head", which is what was being counted at these assemblies.
- Small balls or other objects, such as corn, pebbles, beans, bullets, colored marbles, or cards. This is the origin of the term ballot, originally meaning "small ball".
- Raising of hands at an assembly
- Cutting a brightly colored ballot (with the color corresponding to the party of choice) out of a newspaper and bringing it to a polling place
- An open ballot system

Private methods of citizen voting have included:

- Writing the name of the preferred candidate or outcome on a piece of paper and putting it in a container (which excludes illiterate voters)
- Marking a government-printed ballot (which may exclude illiterate voters if they only include words and cannot get assistance, but some ballots include colors, symbols, or pictures to avoid this)

== History ==
=== Ancient ===
In ancient Greece, secret ballots were used in several situations like ostracism and also to remain hidden from people seeking favors. In early 5th century BC the secrecy of ballot at ecclesia was not the primary concern, but more of a consequence of using ballots to count the votes accurately. Secret ballot was introduced into public life of Athens during second half of the fifth century.

In ancient Rome, the Tabellariae Leges (English: Ballot Laws) were four laws that implemented secret ballots for votes cast regarding each of the major elected assemblies of the Roman Republic. Three of the four laws were put in place in relatively quick succession, with one each in the years 139 BC, 137 BC, and 131 BC, applying respectively to the elections of magistrates, jury deliberations excepting charges of treason as well as the passage of laws. The final of the four laws was implemented more than two decades later in 107 BC and served solely to expand the law passed in 137 BC to require secret ballots for all jury deliberations, including treason.

Before these ballot laws, one was required to verbally provide their vote to an individual responsible for tallying the votes, effectively publicly making every voter's vote known. Mandating secret ballots had the effect of reducing the influence of the Roman aristocracy, who were capable of influencing elections through a combination of bribes and threats. Secret balloting helps assuage both of those concerns, as not only are one's peers unable to determine which way you voted, there is additionally no proof that could be produced that one did vote certain way, perhaps contravening directions.

=== France ===
Article 31 of the Constitution of the Year III of the Revolution (1795) states that "All elections are to be held by secret ballot". The same goes with the constitution of 1848: voters could hand-write the name of their preferred candidate on their ballot at home (the only condition was to write on white paper) or receive one distributed on the street. The ballot was folded in order to prevent other people from reading its contents.

Louis-Napoléon Bonaparte attempted to abolish the secret ballot for the 1851 plebiscite with an electoral decree requesting electors to write down "yes" or "no" under the eyes of everyone. But he faced strong opposition and eventually relented, allowing the secret ballot to occur.

According to the official website of the National Assembly (the lower house of the French parliament), the voting booth was permanently adopted only in 1913.

=== Belgium ===
The British Ballot Act 1872 inspired Belgian Catholic minister Jules Malou to implement the Belgian Secret Ballot Act of 9 July 1877. The subsequent 1878 Belgian general election led to a victory for the Liberal Party.

The 1877 law introduced the ballot (as opposed to simply writing any name on a piece of paper) as well as the voting booth.

=== United Kingdom ===
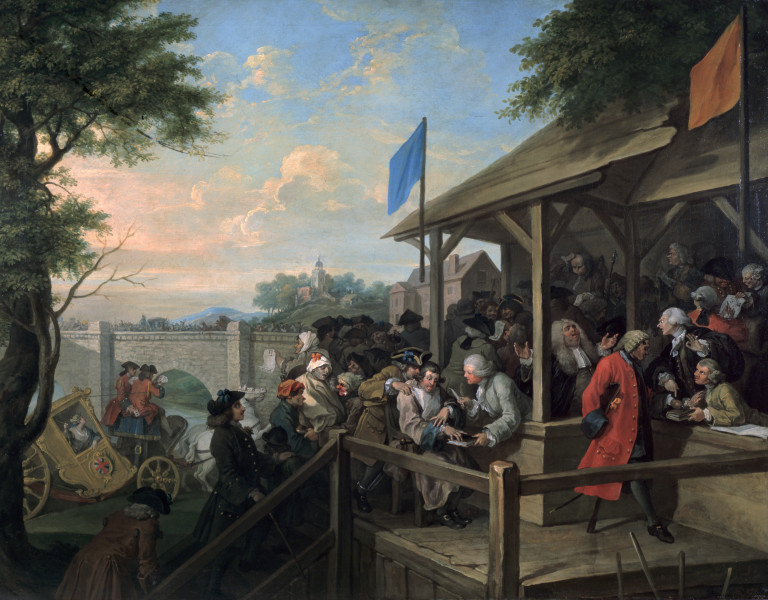
The Polling by William Hogarth (1755). Before the secret ballot was introduced, voter intimidation was commonplace.

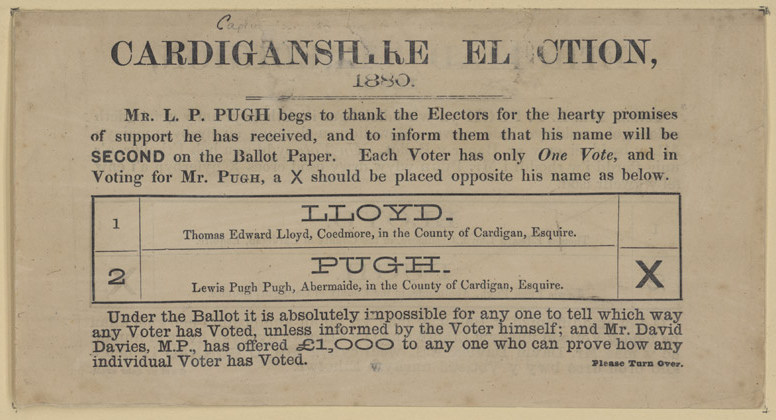
A British "how to vote" card from 1880

The demand for a secret ballot was one of the six points of Chartism. The British parliament of the time refused even to consider the Chartist demands. Still, Lord Macaulay, in an 1842 speech, while rejecting Chartism's six points as a whole, admitted that the secret ballot was one of the two points he could support.

The London School Board election of 1870 was Britain's first large-scale election by secret ballot.

After several failed attempts (several of them spearheaded by George Grote), the secret ballot was eventually extended generally in the Ballot Act 1872, substantially reducing the cost of campaigning (as treating was no longer realistically possible) and was first used on 15 August 1872 to re-elect Hugh Childers as MP for Pontefract in a ministerial by-election following his appointment as Chancellor of the Duchy of Lancaster. The original ballot box, sealed in wax with a licorice stamp, is held at Pontefract museum.

=== Australia and New Zealand ===
In Australia, secret balloting appears to have been first implemented in Tasmania on 7 February 1856.

Until the original Tasmanian Electoral Act 1856 was "re-discovered" recently, credit for the first implementation of the secret ballot often went to Victoria, where the former mayor of Melbourne William Nicholson pioneered it, and simultaneously South Australia. Victoria enacted legislation for secret ballots on 19 March 1856.

=== Singapore ===
A secret ballot is used in Singaporean elections to ensure the election's integrity and that the voter's decision is respected and kept secret. Ballot boxes undergo tamperproofing checks before use to ensure that they are not tampered with. These boxes are sealed (except for the opening slots) prior to the voting window, which opens at 8 a.m. SGT for 12 hours. To facilitate accounting, each ballot has a serial number with a counterfoil attached to it; the counterfoil is also used for facilitating vote tracing if a court order is needed. Per safety and privacy reasons, voters are forbidden from using electronic devices inside a polling station, and may not bring ballot papers out of the polling station. They are also advised not to make any markings (other than a X or a cross) by which they may be identified, as such votes may be rejected by officials. Exit polls are also illegal under the election act to maintain secrecy of voting; however, sample counts, a variant of the procedure, have been used since the 2015 general election to reduce speculation from unofficial sources.

After the voting window ends, a ballot box has its opening sealed and is transported to the polling station's designated counting centre under police escort. The boxes then undergo accounting before being opened for vote-counting to ensure that they are fully present and that their seals are intact. After the election, ballots and other official documents used for the election are placed in a new, separate box, and transferred to a secure vault inside the Supreme Court where it will be locked for up to six months under safe custody. Only a judge of the Supreme Court has the discretion to open the sealed boxes for inspection, although the power is to institute or maintain a prosecution or an application to invalidate an election. After six months, the boxes are transported to Tuas South Incineration Plant and destroyed thereafter.

=== United States ===
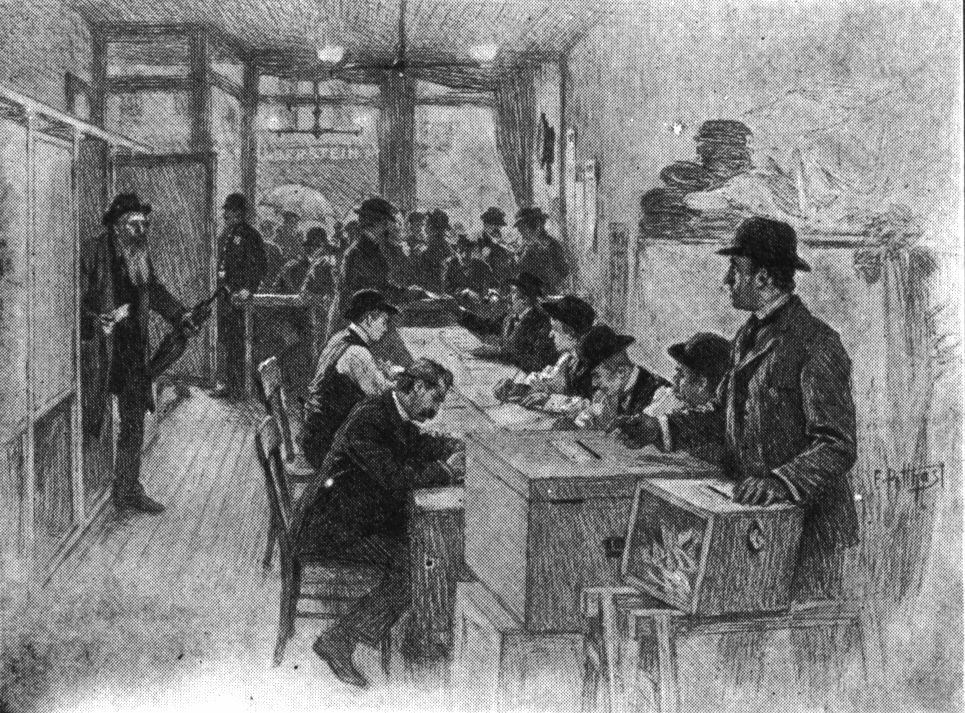
New York polling place c. 1900, showing voting booths on the left

Before the final years of the 19th century, partisan newspapers printed filled-out ballots, which party workers distributed on election day so voters could drop them directly into the boxes. Individual states moved to secret ballots soon after the presidential election of 1884, finishing with Kentucky in 1891 when it quit using an oral ballot.

Initially, however, a state's new ballot did not necessarily have all four components of an "Australian ballot":

1. an official ballot being printed at public expense,
2. on which the names of the nominated candidates of all parties and all proposals appear,
3. being distributed only at the polling place and
4. being marked in secret.

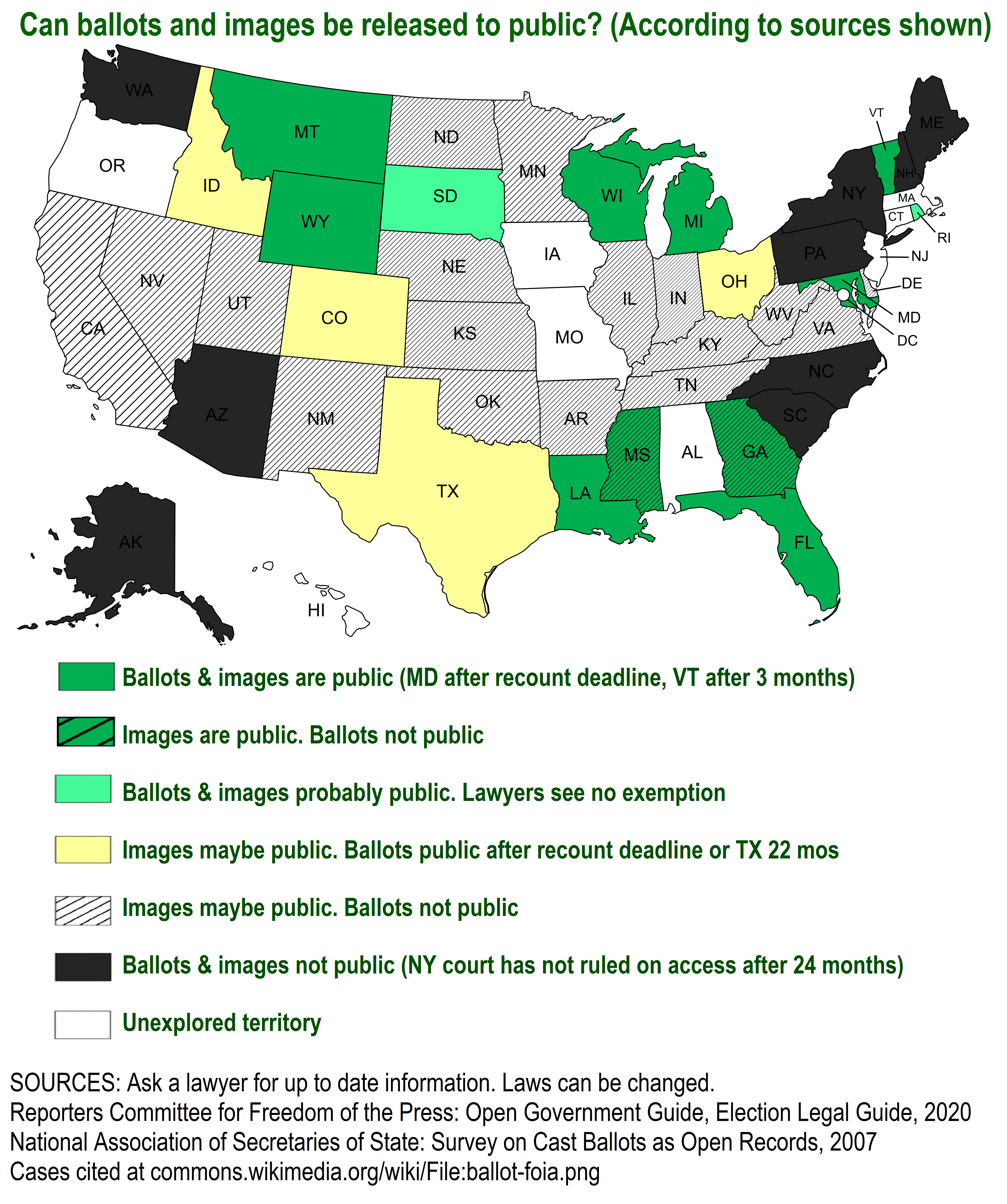
Ballots or scanned images available to public for independent audits

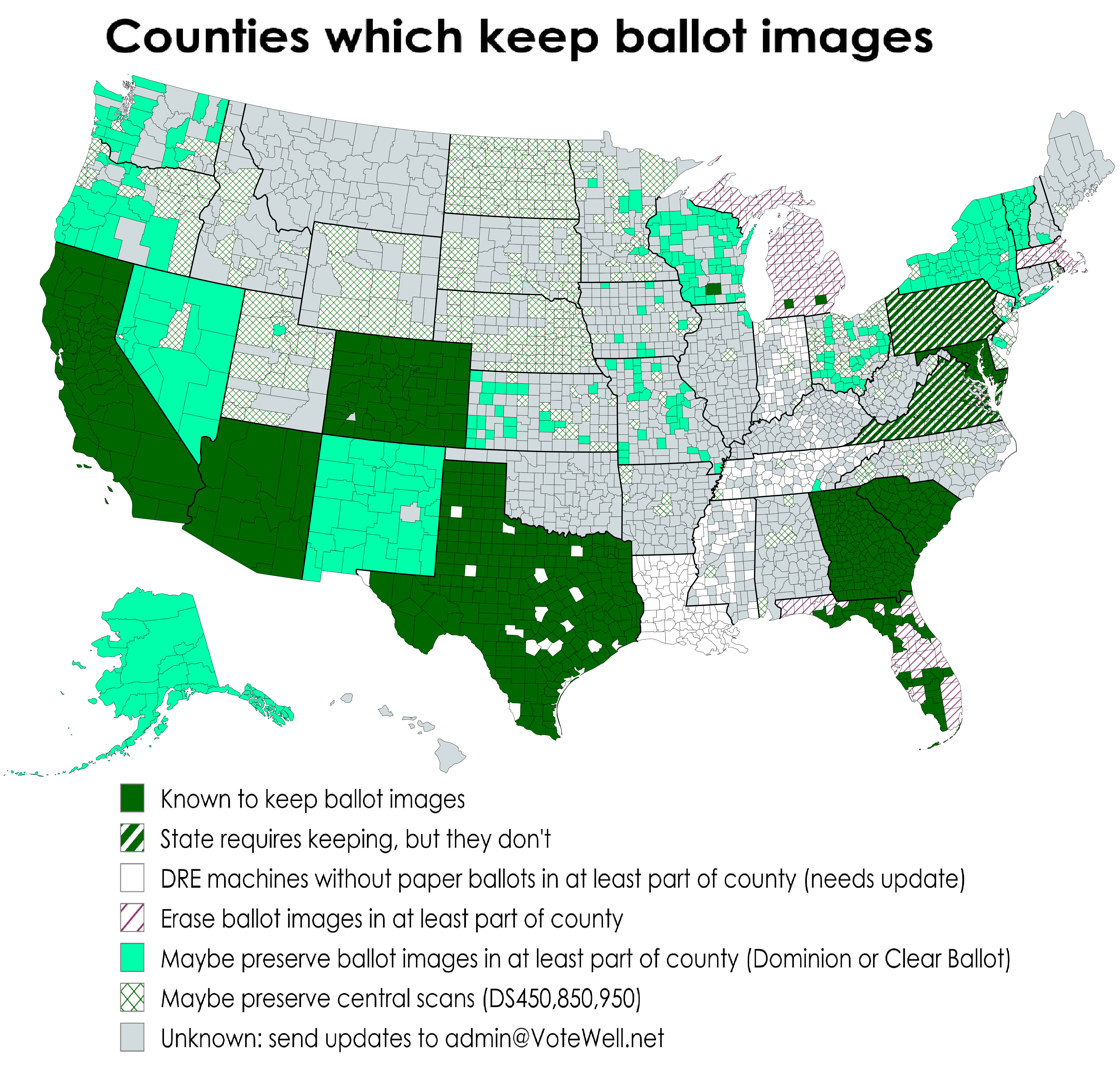
Ballot images saved by election scanners

After ballots are cast and no longer identifiable to the voter, several states make the ballots and copies of them available to the public so the public can check counts and do other research with the anonymous ballots.

Louisville, Kentucky, was the first city in the United States to adopt the Australian ballot. It was drafted by Lewis Naphtali Dembitz, the uncle of and inspiration for future Supreme Court associate justice Louis Brandeis. Massachusetts adopted the first state-wide Australian ballot, written by reformer Richard Henry Dana III, in 1888. Consequently, it is also known as the "Massachusetts ballot". Seven states did not have government-printed ballots until the 20th century. Georgia started using them in 1922. When South Carolina followed suit in 1950, this completed the nationwide switch to Australian ballots. The 20th century also brought the first criminal prohibitions against buying votes in 1925.

While U.S. elections are now held primarily by secret ballot, there are a few exceptions:

- North Carolina has a confidential but not secret ballot for early in-person voting (one-stop) and absentee-by-mail voting. General Statute § 163-227.5 states that the "ballot shall have a ballot number on it in accordance with G.S. 163-230.1(c), or shall have an equivalent identifier to allow for retrievability." If a voter casts an absentee ballot or votes at a one-stop site (early voting) or absentee-by-mail, but it is discovered that the voter was ineligible (ex., died between casting ballot and election day), the ballot would be retrieved using a unique number written at the top of the ballot. Each county Election Director maintains a database with the names of each voter and associated retrievable ballot numbers.
- Mail-in ballots do not meet the definition of Australian ballots, as they are distributed to voters' homes, and there is no guarantee that they are marked secretly. They may be used as absentee ballots, and Colorado, Oregon, and Washington conduct all elections by mail.
- In some U.S. states, a political party nominating caucus requires an open ballot system. This includes, most notably, the leadoff Presidential nominating state of Iowa.
- The Constitution of West Virginia specifies that voters may choose to cast an open ballot, though they must also have the option to cast a secret ballot.

== International law ==
The right to hold elections by secret ballot is included in numerous treaties and international agreements that obligate their signatory states:

- Article 21.3 of the Universal Declaration of Human Rights states, "The will of the people...shall be expressed in periodic and genuine elections which...shall be held by secret vote or by equivalent free voting procedures."
- Article 23 of the American Convention on Human Rights (the Pact of San Jose, Costa Rica) grants to every citizen of member states of the Organization of American States the right and opportunity "to vote and to be elected in genuine periodic elections, which shall be by universal and equal suffrage and by secret ballot that guarantees the free expression of the will of the voters".
- Paragraph 7.4 of the Document of the Copenhagen Meeting of the Conference on the Human Dimension of the CSCE obligates the member states of the Organization for Security and Cooperation in Europe to "ensure that votes are cast by secret ballot or by equivalent free voting procedure, and that they are counted and reported honestly with the official results made public."
- Article 5 of the Convention on the Standards of Democratic Elections, Electoral Rights and Freedoms in the Member States of the Commonwealth of Independent States obligates electoral bodies not to perform "any action violating the principle of voter's secret will expression."
- Article 29 of the Convention on the Rights of Persons with Disabilities requires that all Contracting States protect "the right of persons with disabilities to vote by secret ballot in elections and public referendums".

== Disabled people ==
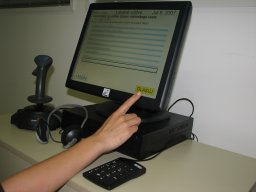
ISG TopVoter, a voting machine which assures secret ballot for voters with disabilities

Ballot design and polling place architecture often deny the disabled the possibility to cast a vote secretly. In many democracies disabled persons may vote by appointing another person who is allowed to join them in the voting booth and fill the ballot in their name. This does not assure secrecy of the ballot.

The United Nations Convention on the Rights of Persons with Disabilities, which entered into force in 2008, ensures a secret ballot for disabled voters. Article 29 of the Convention requires that all Contracting States protect "the right of the person with disabilities to vote by secret ballot in elections and public referendums". According to this provision, each Contracting State should provide voting equipment enabling disabled voters to vote independently and secretly. Some democracies, e.g. the United States, the Netherlands, Slovenia, Albania or India allow disabled voters to use electronic voting machines. In others, among them Azerbaijan, Canada, Ghana, the United Kingdom, and most African and Asian countries, visually impaired voters can use ballots in Braille or paper ballot templates. Article 29 also requires that Contracting States ensure "that voting procedures, facilities and materials are appropriate, accessible and easy to understand and use." In some democracies, e.g., the United Kingdom, Sweden and the United States, all the polling places already are fully accessible for disabled voters.

== Officeholders ==
In some countries, including France, Georgia, Hungary, South Korea and Turkey, the secret ballot is used by members of legislative bodies for impeachment of officeholders. Additionally, South Korea's National Assembly uses the secret ballot for votes on appointments, dismissals and veto overrides.

== Secrecy exceptions ==
The United Kingdom secret ballot arrangements are sometimes criticised because linking a ballot paper to the voter who cast it is possible. Each ballot paper is numbered, and each elector has a number. When an elector is given a ballot paper, their number is noted down on the counterfoil of the ballot paper (which also carries the ballot paper number). The secrecy of the ballot is not guaranteed if anyone sees the counterfoils, which are locked away before the ballot boxes are opened at the count.

This measure is thought to be justified as a security arrangement so that false ballot papers could be identified if there was an allegation of fraud. The process of matching ballot papers to voters is formally permissible only if an Election Court requires it; the Election Court has rarely made such an order since the secret ballot was introduced in the Ballot Act 1872. One example was in a close local election contest in Richmond-upon-Thames in the late 1970s with three disputed ballots and a declared majority of two votes. Reportedly, prisoners were observed identifying voters' ballot votes on a list in 2008. The legal authority for this system is set out in the Parliamentary Elections Rules in Schedule 1 of the Representation of the People Act 1983.

Most states guarantee a secret ballot in the United States. Some states, including Indiana and North Carolina, require the ability to link some ballots to voters. This may, for example, be used with absentee voting to retain the ability to cancel a vote if the voter dies before election day. Sometimes the number on the ballot is printed on a perforated stub which is torn off and placed on a ring (like a shower curtain ring) before the ballot is cast into the ballot box. The stubs prove that an elector has voted and ensure they can only vote once, but the ballots are both secret and anonymous. At the end of voting day, the number of ballots inside the box should match the number of stubs on the ring, certifying that a registered elector cast every ballot and that none of them were lost or fabricated. Sometimes, the ballots themselves are numbered, making the vote trackable. In 2012 in Colorado, this procedure was ruled legal by Federal District Judge Christine Arguello, who determined that the U.S. Constitution does not grant a right to a secret ballot.

== Chronology of introduction ==
Date	Country	Notes
1831	France	Systems before 1856 (including those in France, the Netherlands, and Colombia) "merely required ballots to be marked in polling booths and deposited into ballot boxes, which permitted non-uniform ballots, including ballots of different colours and sizes, that could be easily identified as party tickets."
1856 (February 7)	Australia (Tasmania)	The other Australian colonies of Victoria (March 19, 1856), South Australia (April 2, 1856), New South Wales (1858), Queensland (1859), and Western Australia (1877) followed.
1866	Sweden	Voters previously chose a party-specific ballot in the open, which had been criticised for limiting the secrecy. However, the ballots are now placed behind a privacy screen, so the secrecy remains. European Commission for democracy through law (Venice Commission) "Voters are entitled to [secrecy of ballot], but must also respect it themselves, and non-compliance must be punished by disqualifying any ballot paper whose content has been disclosed [...] Violation of the secrecy of the ballot must be punished, just like violations of other aspects of voter freedom." (Code of good practice in electoral matters, art. 52, 55)
1867	Germany	August 1867 North German federal election
1872	United Kingdom	Ballot Act 1872
1877	Belgium	The Act of 9 July 1877 or "Malou Act", based on the British Ballot Act 1872
1891	United States of America	Individual states adopted secret ballots between 1884 and 1891. (Massachusetts was the first to meet all of the Australian ballot requirements in 1888. South Carolina was the last, in 1950.)
1901	Denmark	In connection with The Shift of Government (Danish: Systemskiftet)
1903	Iceland	Originally passed by the Icelandic parliament in 1902, but the legislation was rejected by King Christian IX for technical reasons unrelated to ballot secrecy. Passed into law 1903.
1912	Argentina	Sáenz Peña Law
1939	Hungary	The secret ballot system was already applied at the 1920 elections, but in 1922, the government reinstated open voting in the countryside. Between 1922 and 1939, only the voters in the capital (Budapest) and larger cities could vote with secret ballot. The electoral law passed in 1938 introduced the nationwide secret ballot system again.

== See also ==
- Ballot selfie
- Election fraud
- Knowledge falsification
- Preference falsification
- Voter suppression
