= French Constitution of 1852 =

Governing law of France during the Second Empire

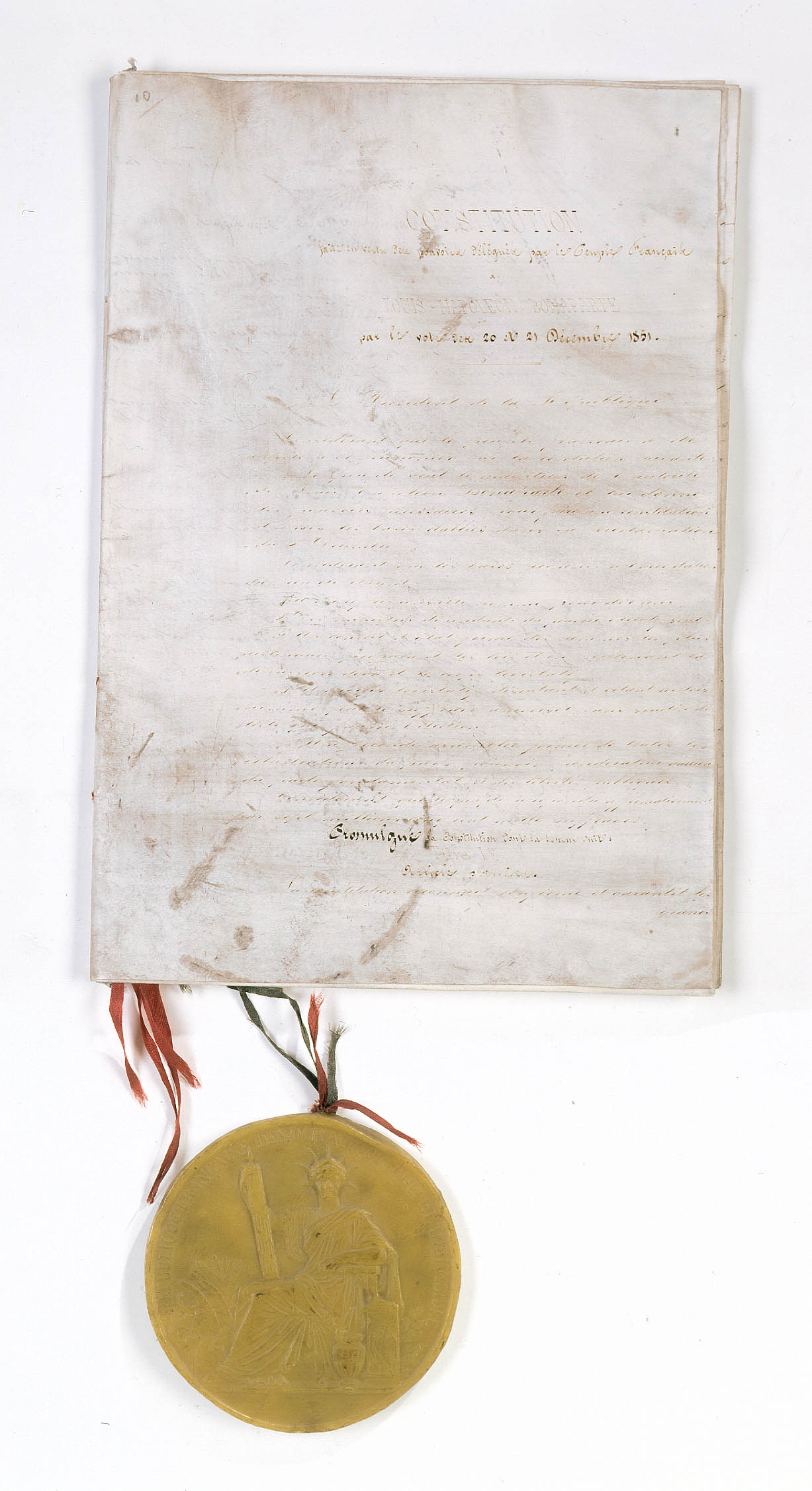
- French Constitution of 1852.

Overview
- Original title: (in French) Constitution française de 1852
- Jurisdiction: France
- System: Dictatorship Unitary constitutional monarchy (began 1860, made constitutional 1870)
- Chambers: Unicameral (until 1867): Corps législatif Bicameral (after 1867): Senate and Corps législatif
- Executive: Emperor
- Supersedes: French Constitution of 1848
- Superseded by: French constitutional laws of 1875

The French Constitution of 1852 was enacted on 14 January 1852 by Charles Louis Napoléon Bonaparte (Napoleon III). Slightly modified later that year, on 25 December 1852 the constitution became the basis for the creation of the Second French Empire.

== Adoption ==
Louis Napoléon effectively brought an end to the Second French Republic by the coup d'état of 2 December 1851. The same day, he had posters issued that proclaimed to the French people (Appel au peuple) his desire to restore the "system created by the First Consul" — his uncle and inspiration Napoleon Bonaparte.

His coup was ratified by plebiscite on 22 and 23 December 1851. This vote was heavily rigged, resulting in 92 percent voting in favour. Backed by this strong success, he encouraged counsellors Rouher, Baroche and Troplong to quickly write the new constitution which was enacted on 14 January 1852. The constitution was modified by the French Senate (by a "senatus-consulte") on 7 November 1852 to permit the re-establishing of the Empire, with the crown to be hereditary in Louis-Napoléon and his family. The amended document was approved in another heavily rigged plebiscite (97 percent voted yes). The Second Empire was proclaimed on 2 December 1852 and the Imperial Constitution enacted on 25 December 1852, without any significant change to the 14 January constitution.

== The Prince-President ==
The constitution rejected the Ancien régime and the post-revolutionary restoration monarchies with census suffrage. It referred directly to the French Revolution – saying that it "recognizes, confirms and guarantees the principles proclaimed in 1789" – and especially to the First French Empire.

Louis Napoléon was persuaded that democracy needed to be incarnated in a man, and the Constitution of 1851 was a return to the democratic Caesarism of his uncle Napoléon Bonaparte. The regime was characterized by a strong personal power backed by universal suffrage; the French people remained "sovereign", and in this way the Second Empire was different from the earlier constitutional monarchies.

== Division of powers ==
=== Personal government ===
The constitution extended the president's term to 10 years, with no term limits. Under the provisions of the constitution, Louis-Napoléon Bonaparte was automatically reelected to a fresh term as president.

The president was vested with sweeping executive powers. He was commander-in-chief of the armed forces, and had the powers of clemency and amnesty, as well as the ability to enact and sign treaties. He also appointed and dismissed governmental ministers and dissolved the Legislative Body.

He was assisted by the Council of State (Conseil d'État) which he controlled and presided, and whose job it was to write and support legislation.

Under Article 4 of the constitution, he could initiate, sign or veto any legislation or senate decree ("senatus-consulte").

In practice, so much power was concentrated in the president's hands that when the Second Empire was proclaimed, the only substantive changes were the replacement of the word "president" with the word "emperor," and the provision that the emperor's post was hereditary.

=== Weakened assemblies ===
The two French parliamentary assemblies were highly controlled and had limited powers.

The Corps législatif (Legislative Body – the same name had been used for the French legislature during the French Consulate and First French Empire from 1799–1814), comprised 260 deputies (representatives) elected for 6 years by direct universal suffrage, but gerrymandering of the election districts ("circonscriptions") and the system of "official candidates" favored partisans of the president/emperor. The Legislative Body could neither amend laws nor censure the actions of the ministers, and had no legislative autonomy, as its president and its rules were designated by the government.

The French Senate was composed of from 80 to 150 members appointed for life by the president. It had the right to issue decrees, called senatus-consulte, to modify institutions and to verify the constitutionality of laws.

== Evolution towards a parliamentary regime ==
Over time, various decrees and the "senatus-consulte" modified the constitution and progressively increased the power of the assemblies. In 1860, Napoleon III permitted the Senate and Legislative Body to once again have the right to air their opinions and grievances on the acts of the government. In 1861, the Legislative Body began to publish its debates; in 1867 it gained the power to direct questions to the government; in 1869, it gained the power to initiate and amend legislation.

== See also ==
- Constitution of France
- French Parliament
- Politics of France
- History of France
