= Alphonse Baudin =

French politician (1811–1851)

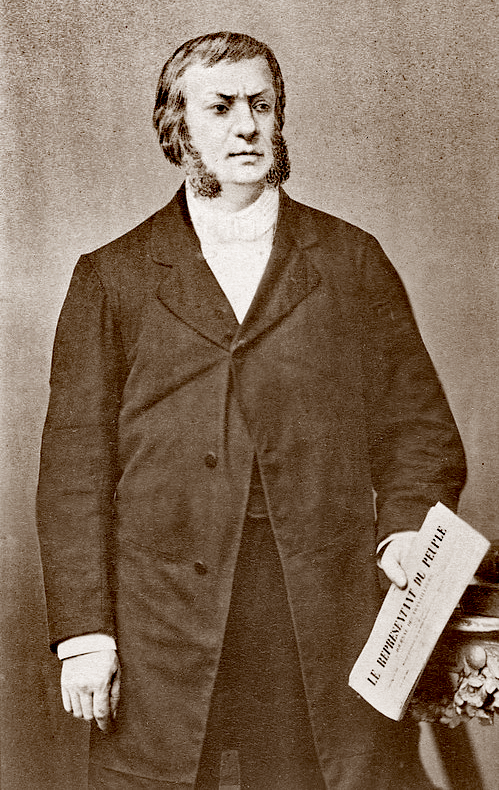
- Born: October 23, 1811; Nantua
- Died: December 3, 1851 (aged 40); Paris
- Known for: Killing by Bonapartist coup forces

Jean-Baptiste Alphonse Victor Baudin (23 October 1811 in Nantua - 3 December 1851 in Paris) was a French medical doctor and deputy to the assembly in 1849 famous for having been killed on a barricade during the coup of 1851.

== Career ==
He studied medicine in Lyon and Paris. He served as a medical officer in Algeria, where he met Eugène Cavaignac.

== The coup of 1851 ==
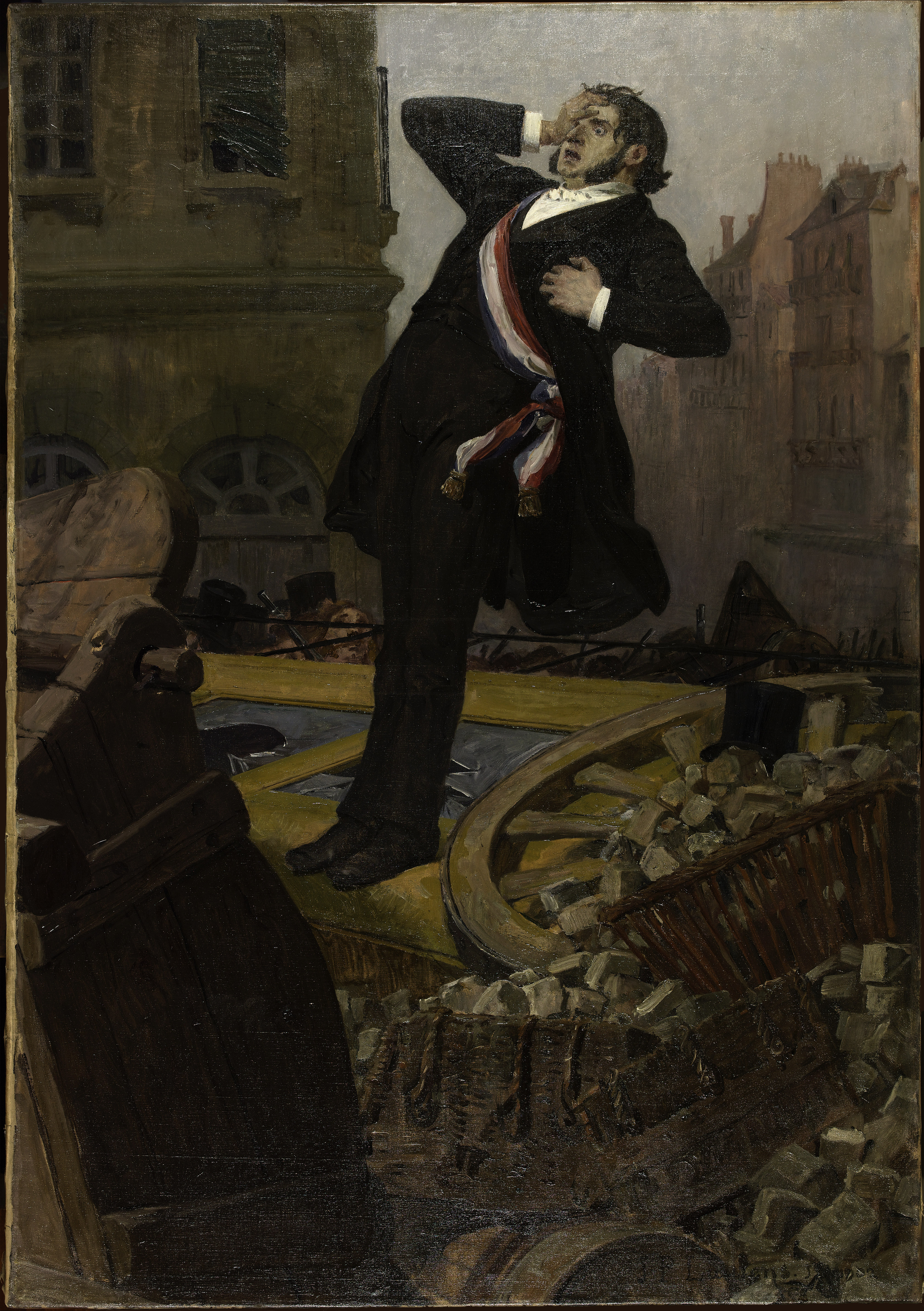
Jean-Paul Laurens, The Death of Deputy Baudin.

Baudin was initiated into Freemasonry on 15 June 1842, at the Lodge Hall Friends of Honor French, which was suspended in 1846.

Elected on 13 May 1849, he sat with representatives of the Mountain, and is part of the resistance committee organized by the Republicans to try to raise the workers of the Faubourg Saint-Antoine against the coup d'etat of 2 December 1851, of Prince Louis Napoleon Bonaparte (later Emperor Napoleon III).

During the insurrection caused by the coup, a barricade was erected on 3 December by the workers of the Sainte-Marguerite, who were joined by several members, including: Pierre Malardier, member of Nièvre and Baudin, representative of the Ain to the legislative assembly in 1849. While Victor Schoelcher, accompanied by several MPs, without arms, went out to meet a company of the 19th line coming from the Place de la Bastille with the intention to negotiate with the soldiers, laborers mocked these representatives of the people, saying: "Do you think we'll get us killed for you to keep your five dollars a day!" Baudin, flag in hand, mounted on the barricade stared and said: "You'll see how to die for five dollars!" It was at that time a rock wounded a soldier of 19th line. His comrades immediately replied angrily, and Baudin fell, mortally wounded. The word repeatedly reported is however not attested by any eyewitness. It appears in the historical narrative of journalist Eugene Ténot of Paris in December 1851 written in 1868.

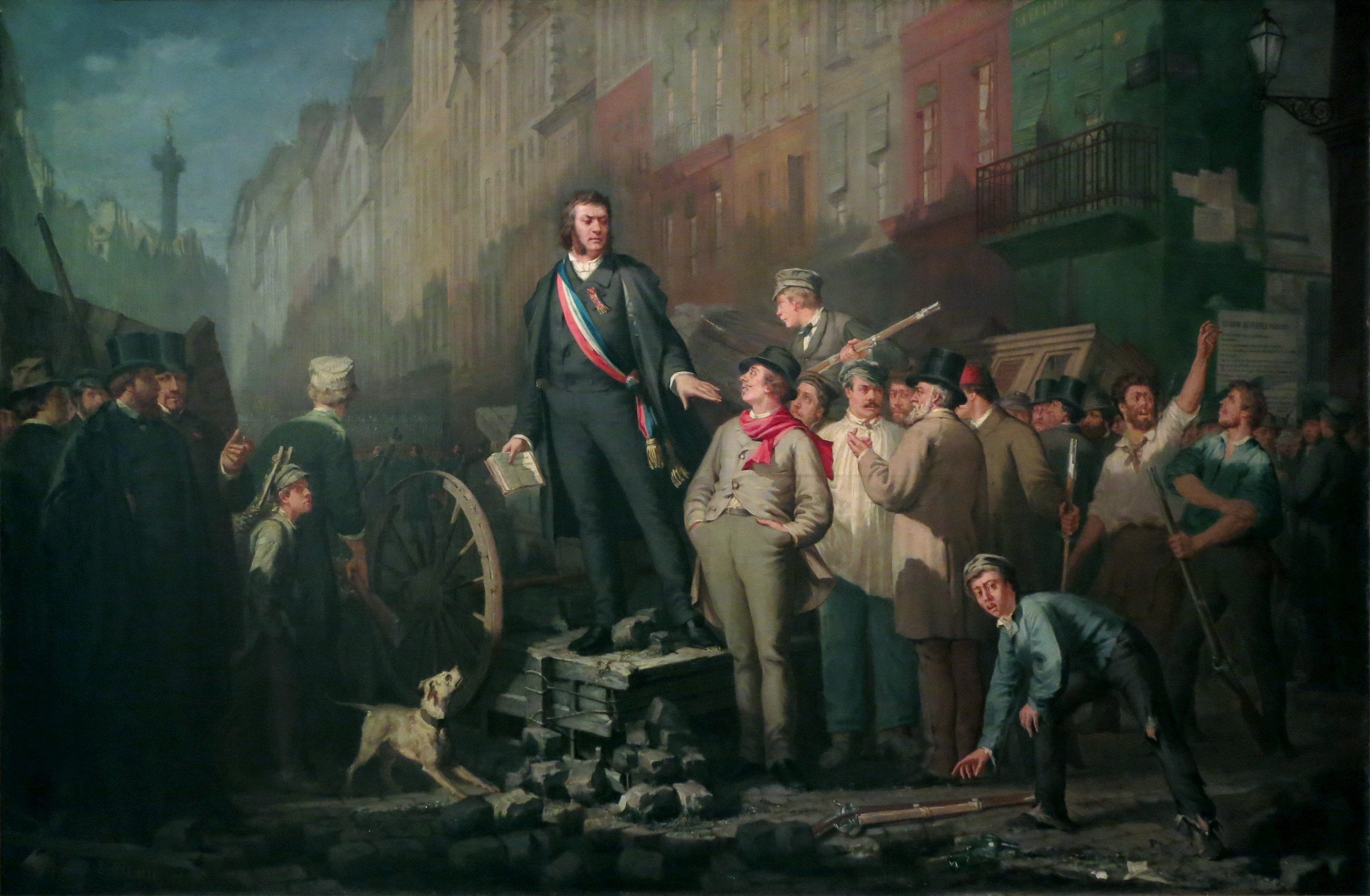
French: Alphonse Baudin (1811-1851) sur la barricade du faubourg Saint-Antoine, le 3 décembre 1851

== Legacy ==
He was buried secretly at Montmartre Cemetery, where his grave became a place of rendezvous for Republicans. His remains were deposited in the Panthéon, Paris, on 4 August 1889 for the centennial of the French Revolution.

A public subscription was then launched by the newspaper The Rise to raise a monument to martyr of freedom. This initiative earned Louis Charles Delescluze, publisher of a trial in which Léon Gambetta, then a young lawyer, distinguished himself.

The monument, located behind the Place de la Bastille on the avenue Ledru-Rollin near the spot where he was killed, was dismantled in 1942 to be melted under a law of the Vichy government to "recover Nonferrous Metals".

The mayor of Paris has recently refused to reinstate it. The city, however, gave in 1978 the name of rue Alphonse Baudin to a new street in the 11th arrondissement.
