= Pope Pius IX and France =

The foreign relations between Pope Pius IX and France reflected Pope Pius IX's hostility to the French Third Republic's anticlerical politics, as well as Napoleon III's influence over the Papal States. But this did not prevent church life in France from flourishing during much of this pontificate.

== Concord between liberal and conservative factions ==
When Pius IX assumed the papacy in 1846, French Catholics were divided into a liberal faction under Charles Forbes René de Montalembert and a conservative faction under Louis Veuillot. They agreed on the right to private schools, freedom of instruction, financial support by the State and a rejection of gallicanism. Pius addressed the French bishops with his encyclical Inter Multiplices, in which he asked for concord of mind and will among the French. Under Napoleon III, French Catholics got much of what they wanted. Napoleon III, because of his defense of the Papal States, was also seen as a defender of the Church and of Catholic interests.

== Blossoming of Church life in France ==
French religious life blossomed under Pius IX. Many French Catholics were in favour of the dogmatization of Papal infallibility and the assumption of Mary in the forthcoming ecumenical council. The French bishops, with some notable exceptions, were faithful to the Holy See. During the pontificate of Pius IX, some five Catholic universities were founded, in the cities of Lille, Angers, Lyon and Toulouse, in which clerics were educated in a strict (although some argued, scientifically less than desirable) manner.

== 1849 attack on the Roman Republic ==
When the Revolutions of 1848 in the Italian states broke out, there was a rebellion against Pope Pius IX in Rome, forcing him to flee to Gaeta. The Pope appealed for support; and French President Louis Napoleon (the future Napoleon III) encouraged Pius IX and assured him of reinforcements from France. In April 1849, General Oudinot's expeditionary force arrived at Civitavecchia to attack the revolutionary Roman Republic, and the Constituent Assembly in Rome passed a resolution of protest (7 May 1849). Although Louis Napoleon had himself engaged in a liberal insurrection in the Papal States in 1831, it was his troops that crushed the republic (29 June), although Pius IX did not return to Rome until April 1850.

Pius was met with a sullen reception on his return to Rome, as the Romans were unimpressed by the return of the pontiff at the point of French bayonets. He blessed the French troops, held a Te Deum and signalized his return to Rome by an extension of his 1846 amnesty and by a new Indulgence. He frequently repeated his main message that he had returned as a pastor and not as an avenger: in urbem reversus pastor et non ultor.

== Alliance between Cavour and Napoleon III ==
Napoleon III and Cavour, Prime Minister of Sardinia, agreed to go to war with Austria. After the Battle of Magenta (4 July 1859) the Austrian forces withdrew from the Papal States, precipitating their loss to Sardinia. Revolutionaries in Romagna called upon Sardinia for annexation. In February 1860, King Victor Emmanuel II demanded Umbria and the Marches; when his demand was refused, he took them by force, uniting all of Italy except Lazio and San Marino into the new Kingdom of Italy.

== Reliance on French soldiers ==
Throughout the 1860s the remnant of the Papal States came under increased pressure from anti-Papal nationalists, in particular from Giuseppe Garibaldi. The Pope was obliged to rely on French soldiers to maintain order and to protect his territories. An army of volunteers was created in 1860: the Papal Zouaves (zuavi pontifici) under the command of General Lamoricière. They came from different countries including France, Netherlands (the majority), Belgium, Canada and Britain; there were even some from the United States and from Italy.

A French garrison remained in Rome from 1849 to protect the Pope, but this force was withdrawn in 1864 following the September Convention. However a new attack by Garibaldi in 1867 resulted in the hurried return of French troops, defeating him at the Battle of Mentana. The French garrison remained until, facing defeat in the Franco-Prussian War, they were withdrawn in 1870. Thus, for twenty years, the pope ruled the Papal States under French military or diplomatic protection, a fact which further limited his popularity among fervent Italian nationalists.

With the defeat of the French Second Empire in the Franco-Prussian War, the new French Third Republic was more hostile to the Catholic Church, and relations between Pius IX and France deteriorated until the Pope's death.
