= Jean-François Mocquard =

French lawyer and politician

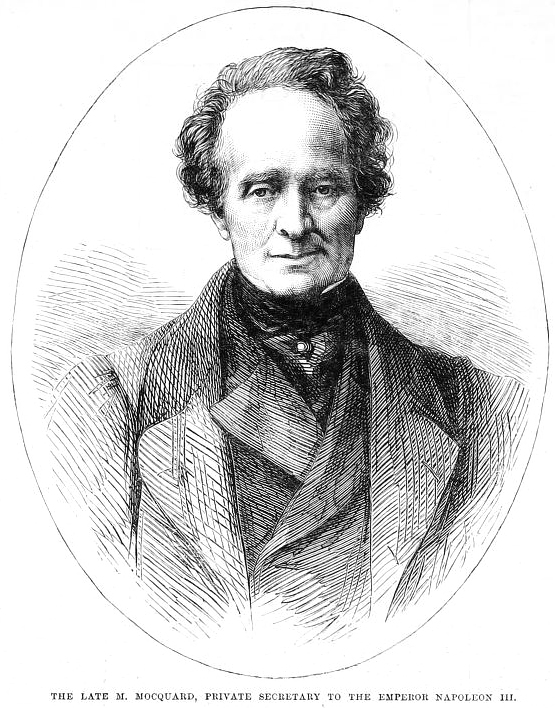
- Born: 11 November 1791; Bordeaux, France
- Died: 12 December 1864 (aged 73); Paris, France
- Resting place: Père Lachaise Cemetery
- Occupation: Politician

Jean-François Mocquard (1791-1864) was a French lawyer and politician. He served as a member of the French Senate from 1863 to 1864. He also served as the chief-of-staff to Emperor Napoleon III. He was buried at the Père Lachaise Cemetery.
