= French Constitution of 1848 =

Lei fundamental francesa que rege a Segunda República

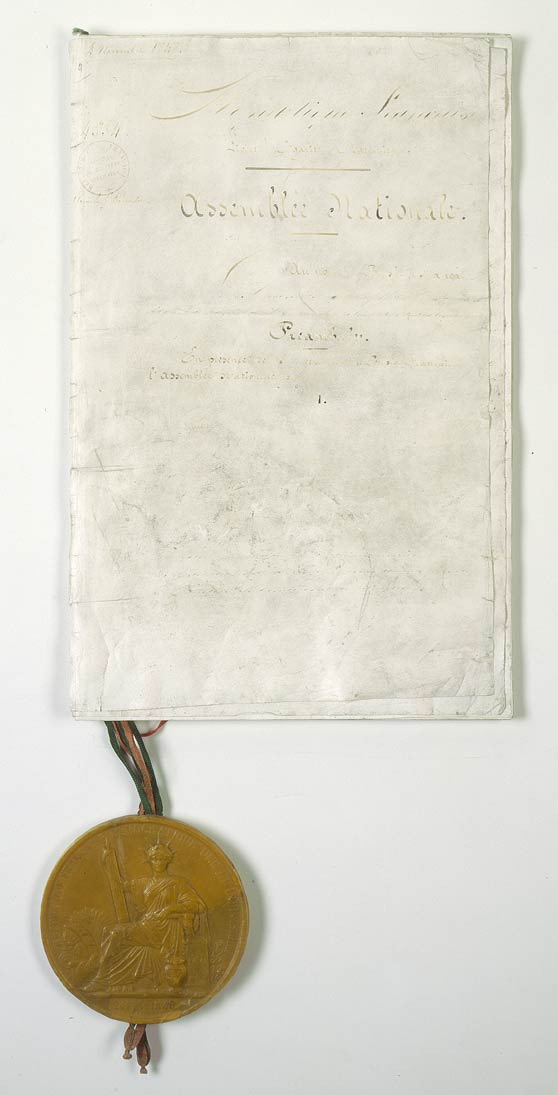
- French Constitution of 1848.

Overview
- Jurisdiction: France
- Ratified: 4 November 1848
- System: Unitary semi-presidential republic
- Chambers: Bicameral (Senate and National Assembly
- Executive: Dual: President; Prime minister
- Repealed: 14 January 1852
- Supersedes: Charter of 1830
- Superseded by: French Constitution of 1852

The Constitution of 1848 is the constitution passed in France on 4 November 1848 by the National Assembly, the constituent body of the Second French Republic. It was repealed on 14 January 1852 by the constitution of 1852 which profoundly changed the face of the Second Republic and served as the basis for the Second French Empire.

== Debates ==
16 delegates were chosen to debate the structure of the new constitution, including Alexis de Tocqueville, author of Democracy in America.

=== Legislature ===
The delegates debated two types of legislature power, unicameral and bicameral legislatures. Most arguments were given in support of a single legislative body. These included the belief that an additional house would only benefit an aristocracy in France. Also, many delegates believed that two houses would slow the pace of political progress happening in France. Tocqueville believed that two houses were necessary to prevent abuses by the executive power as well as prevent political passions from being exerted on the laws.

== Bibliography ==
- Curtis, Eugene (1918). The French assembly of 1848 and American constitutional doctrines. New York: Columbia University Press. ISBN 0-374-92011-7
- Duguit, Léon (1898). Les constitutions et les principales lois politiques de la France depuis 1789 (in French). Paris: F. Pichon.
- Henkin, Louis (1990). Constitutionalism and Rights. New York: Columbia University Press. ISBN 0-231-06570-1
- Luchaire, François [in French] (1998). Naissance d'une constitution : 1848. Histoire des Constitutions de France (in French). Paris: Fayard. ISBN 2-213-59357-4.
- Rials, Stéphane (2010). Textes constitutionnels français. Que sais-je ? (in French). Paris: PUF. ISBN 978-2-13-058537-4.
- Tocqueville (Summer 1961). "Tocqueville On Socialism". New Individualist Review. 1 (2): 18–23.

== See also ==
- Constitution of France
- Politics of France
- Government of France
