= Pascal Pierre Duprat =

French journalist and politician (1815–1885)

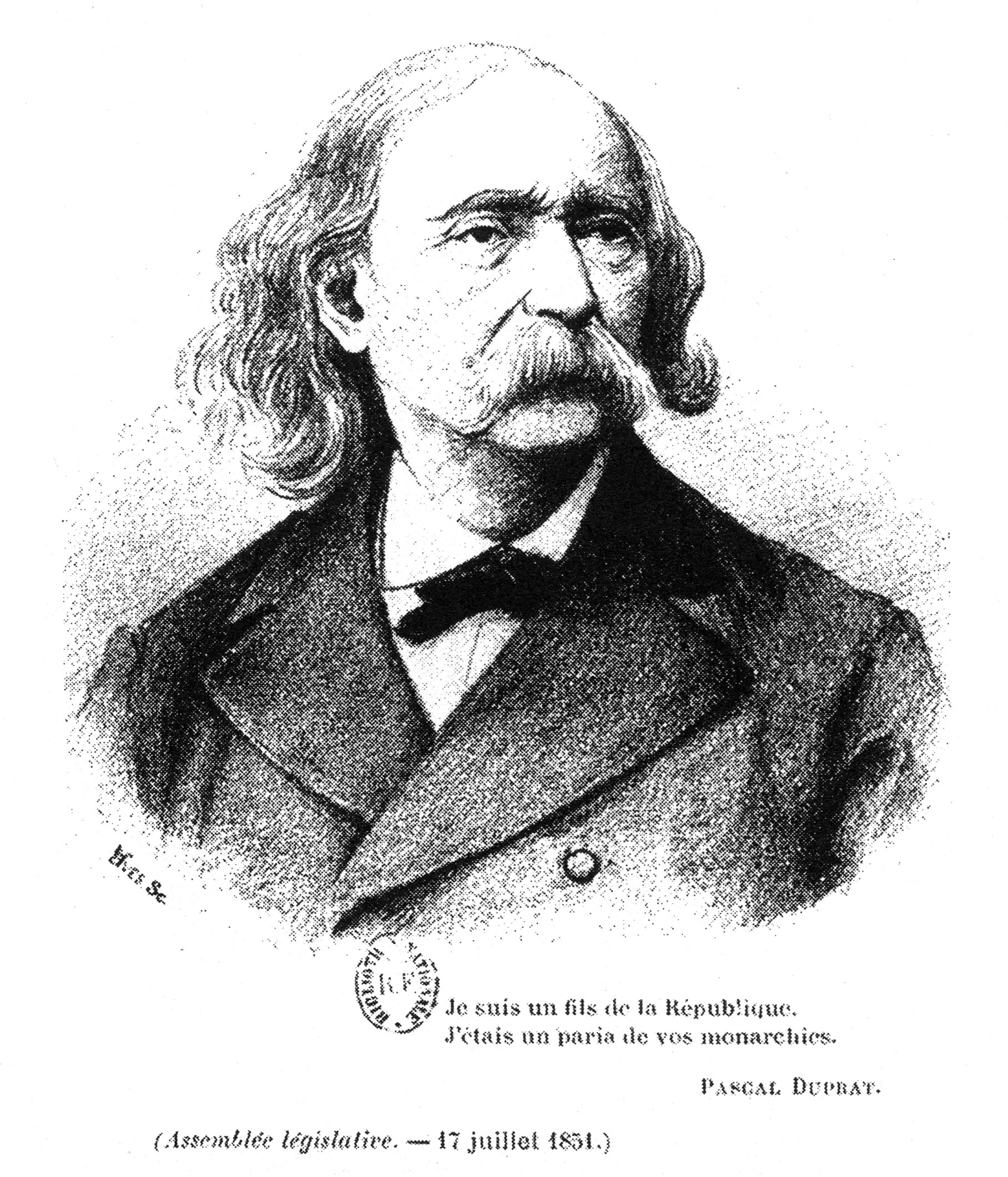

Pascal Pierre Duprat (1815–1885) was a French journalist and politician with republican beliefs. He was elected as a deputy to the Constituent and Legislative Assemblies during the second Republic. He was an opponent of Louis-Napoleon Bonaparte.

== Books ==
- Essai historique sur les races anciennes et modernes de l’Afrique septentrionale : leurs origines, leurs mouvements et leurs transformations, depuis l’antiquité la plus reculée jusqu’à nos jours, Paris, Jules Labitte, 1840, 308 p., in-8°
- Timon et sa logique : avec une préface, Paris, Labitte, 1845, 72 p., in-32
- Une guerre insensée : expédition contre les Kabyles ou Berbers de l’Algérie (Extrait de la Revue indépendante du 25 mars 1845), Paris, Schneider et Langrand, 1845, 15 p., in-8
- Victoire du peuple sur la royauté : inauguration de la République, Paris, Impr. de L. Martinet, 1848, 8 p., in-8°
- De l’État, sa place et son rôle dans la vie des sociétés, Bruxelles, J. Rozez, 1852, 72 p., in-18
- Les tables de proscription de Louis Bonaparte et de ses complices, t. 1, Liège, Redouté, 1852, 2 vol.; in-8°
- Les Encyclopédistes : leurs travaux, leur doctrine et leur influence.
- La Conjuration contre les petits États en Europe, Paris, Librairie internationale, 1867, 56 p., in-18
- Les Révolutions, Paris, Armand Le Chevalier, 1869, 255 p., 18 cm
- L’Esprit des Révolutions, t. 1, Paris, C. Marpon et E. Flammarion, 1879, 467 p., 2 vol. in-8°

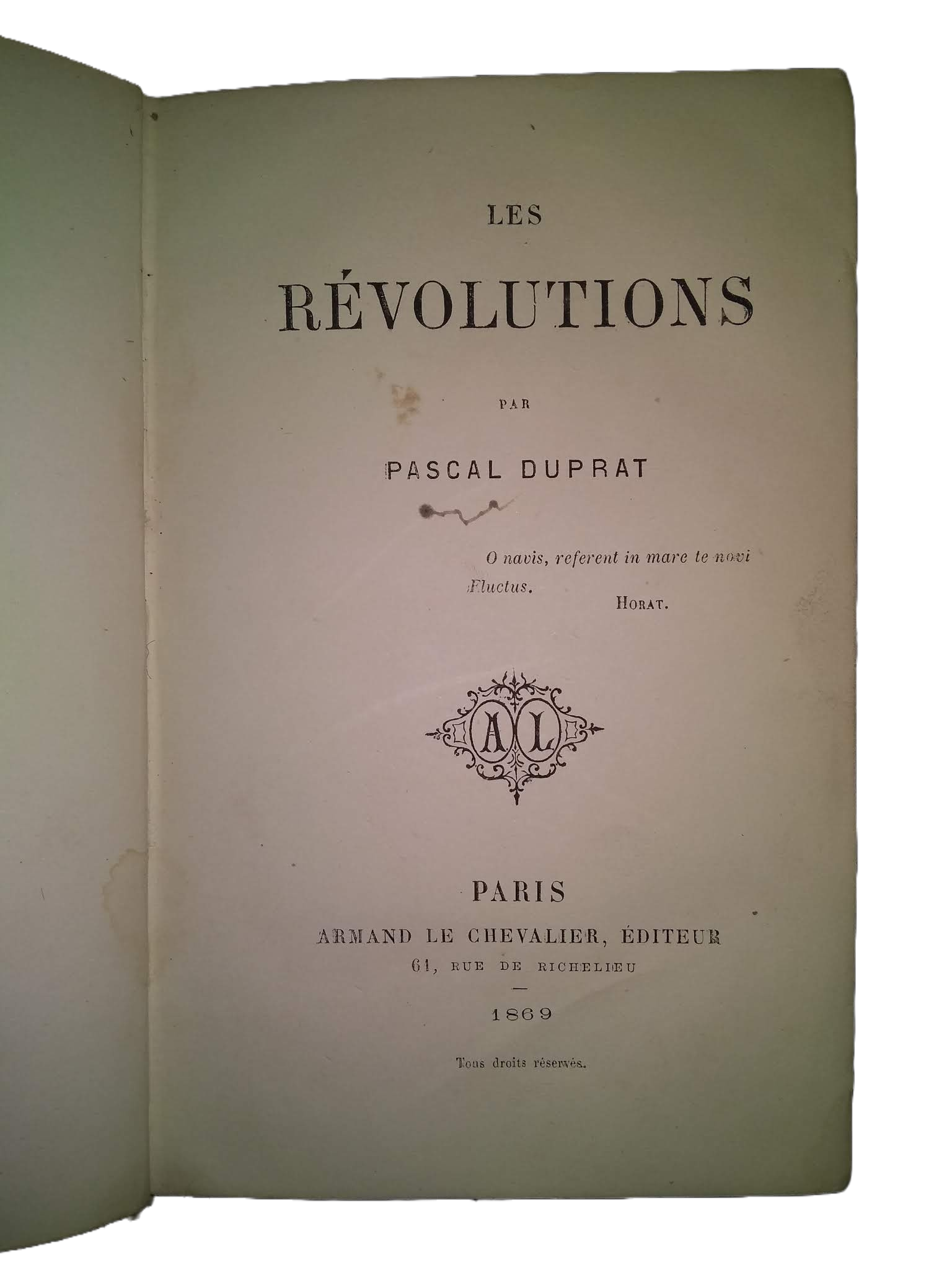
Les Révolutions, Paris, Armand Le Chevalier, 1869, 255 p., 18 cm
