= 1852 French Second Empire referendum =

Referendum on re-establishing the Empire

A referendum on re-establishing the Empire was held in France on 21 and 22 November 1852. Voters were asked whether they approved of the re-establishment of the Empire in the person of Louis Napoléon Bonaparte and his family. It was approved by 97% of voters with an 80% turnout. After the plebiscite, Louis Napoléon assumed the style "Napoleon III, Emperor of the French." As with all other plebiscites under Napoleon III (and Napoleon I before him), the results were blatantly rigged and only served to use the façade of democracy to legitimize their rule.

== Suffrage ==
All French men over the age of 21 were entitled to vote in a commune in which they had resided for six months. Algerians and Kanaks had no right to vote.

== Results ==
The vote was secret with the exception of those serving in the military. However, the authorities only printed yes ballots – voters had to supply their own ballots with no.

Choice	Votes	%
For	7,824,189	96.87
Against	253,145	3.13
Total	8,077,334	100.00
Valid votes	8,077,334	99.22
Invalid/blank votes	63,326	0.78
Total votes	8,140,660	100.00
Registered voters/turnout	10,203,458	79.78
Source: Direct Democracy
