= 1851 French constitutional referendum =

1851 constitutional referendum in France

A referendum was held in France on 20 and 21 December 1851. Voters were asked whether they approved of the continuation of the authority of Louis Napoléon Bonaparte and to delegate the powers required to produce a new constitution. It was approved by 92% of voters with an 81.7% turnout.

All French men over the age of 21 were entitled to vote in a commune in which they had resided for six months. Algerians and Kanaks had no right to vote. The vote was secret with the exception of those serving in the military. However, the authorities only printed yes ballots – voters had to supply their own ballots with no.

== Results ==
92.03% of French voters voted in favor of the amendment, while 18.35% of electors abstained from voting. The official tally and free nature of the vote were questioned by dissidents like Victor Hugo.

Choice	Votes	%
For	7,481,231	92.04
Against	647,292	7.96
Total	8,128,523	100.00
Valid votes	8,128,523	99.55
Invalid/blank votes	37,107	0.45
Total votes	8,165,630	100.00
Registered voters/turnout		81.7
