= List of senators of French Algeria =

Departments of French Algeria from 1934 to 1955. The departments of Oran, Alger and Constantin are in the north

This is a list of senators of French Algeria, senators who have represented departments of French Algeria in the senate of France.

== Third Republic ==
Senators for Algerian departments under the French Third Republic were:

| Department | Senator |
|---|---|
| Algiers | Ferdinand Lelièvre (1876–1885); Alexandre Mauguin (1885-1894); Paul Gerente (1894–1912); Maurice Colin (1912–1920); Jacques Duroux (1921–1938); André Mallarmé (1939–1945) |
| Oran | Nicolas Pomel (1876-1882); Rémy Jacques (1882-1900); Marcel Saint-Germain (1900-1920); Eugène Étienne (1920-1921) died in office; Jules Gasser (1921-1927); Paul Saurin (1927-1933) died in office; Pierre Roux-Freissineng (1933-1944) |
| Constantine | Jacques Lucet (1876-1883) died in office; Dominique Forcioli (1883-1888); Georges Lesueur (1888-1897); Alcide Treille (1897-1906); Charles Albert Aubry (1906-1920); Paul Cuttoli (1920-1941) |

== Fourth Republic ==
Senators for Algerian departments under the French Fourth Republic were:

| Department | Senator |
|---|---|
| Algiers | Henri Borgeaud (1946–1959); Fernand Lemoine (1946–1948); Ahmed Boumendjel (1948); Marhoun Ferhat (1951–1959); Léon Muscatelli (1948–1955); Marcel Rogier (1946–1959); Hadj Ahmed Cherif Saadane (1946–1947) resigned; Abdelkader Saiah (1946–1951); Menouar Saiah (1948–1951) elected deputy; Laurent Schiaffino (1955–1959); Abdennour Tamzali (1948–1959) |
| Oran | Abdel-Kader Benchiha (1948–1959); Khelladi Benmiloud (1954–1958) resigned; René Enjalbert (1951–1959); Henri Fouques-Duparc (1948–1951) elected deputy; Jules Gasser (1946–1952); Etienne Gay (1952–1959); Camille Larribere (1946–1948); Abdel-Kader Mahdad (1946–1947) resigned; Chérif Sid Cara (1946–1953) elected deputy; Ahmed Tahar (1948) |
| Constantine | Hocine Ahmed-Yahia (1948); Jacques Augarde (1951–1959); Mohammed Saleh Bendjelloul (1946–1948); Chérif Benhbyles (1951–1959); Abdesselam Benkhelil (1946–1947) elected deputy; Marcel Delrieu (1952–1959); Henry Doumenc (1946–1948); Abdallah Mahdi (1952–1959); Eugène Meyer (1946–1947); El-Hadi Mostefai (1946–1947 and 1948–1958) resigned; Abdelmadjid Ou Rabah (1946–1951) elected deputy; Cherif Sisbane (1948–1952); Albert Tucci (1948–1952); Jules Valle (1948–1951) elected deputy |

== Fifth republic ==
Senators under the French Fifth Republic served for three years from 1959 until the Independence of Algeria in 1962.

| Senator | Political Group | Years | | District |
|---|---|---|---|---|
| Youssef Achour | Democratic Left | May 31, 1959 | July 4, 1962 | Algiers |
| Labidi Neddaf | Democratic Left | May 31, 1959 | July 4, 1962 | Algiers |
| Gilbert Paulian | Independent Republicans | May 31, 1959 | July 4, 1962 | Algiers |
| Laurent Schiaffino | Democratic Left | May 31, 1959 | July 4, 1962 | Algiers |
| Amar Beloucif | None | May 31, 1959 | July 4, 1962 | Bône |
| Gabriel Burgat | Union for the New Republic | May 31, 1959 | July 4, 1962 | Bône |
| Hacène Ouella | None | May 31, 1959 | July 4, 1962 | Bône |
| Chérif Benhabyles ' | Democratic Left | May 31, 1959 | August 28, 1959 | Constantine |
| Ahmed Bentchicou | Union for the New Republic | May 31, 1959 | July 4, 1962 | Constantine |
| Mohamed Lakhdari | Democratic Left | May 31, 1959 | July 4, 1962 | Constantine |
| Léopold Morel | Democratic Left | May 31, 1959 | July 4, 1962 | Constantine |
| M'hamed Kheirat | Democratic Left | May 31, 1959 | July 4, 1962 | Mostaganem - Tiaret |
| Fernand Male ' | Democratic Left | May 31, 1959 | February 21, 1961 | Mostaganem - Tiaret |
| Benaissa Sassi ' | Democratic Left | May 31, 1959 | July 18, 1961 | Mostaganem - Tiaret |
| Mohamed Belabed | Union for the New Republic | May 31, 1959 | July 4, 1962 | Oasis |
| Amar Beloucif | None | May 31, 1959 | July 4, 1962 | Oran-Tlemcen |

== Sources ==
- Liste des anciens sénateurs de la IIIème République par circonscription (in French), Sénat de France
- Liste des anciens sénateurs de la IVème République par circonscription (in French), Sénat de France
- Liste des anciens sénateurs de la Vème République par circonscription (in French), Sénat de France
