= Mauguin =

Mauguin is a surname. Notable people with the surname include:

- Alexandre Mauguin (1838–1916), French printer, deputy and then senator in French Algeria between 1881 and 1894
- Charles-Victor Mauguin (1878–1958), French professor of mineralogy inventor (with Carl Hermann) of an international standard notation
- François Mauguin (1785-1854), French lawyer and politician

== See also ==
- Hermann–Mauguin notation
