= Lelièvre =

Lelièvre is a French surname. Notable people with the surname include:

- Claude Lelièvre (born 1946), Belgian public servant
- Ferdinand Lelièvre (1799–1885), French colonial agriculturalist, Senator of Algeria
- Gérard Lelièvre (born 1949), French racewalker
- Gilles Lelievre, French slalom canoeist
- Guy Lelièvre (1952–2021), Québécois politician and lawyer
- Mathieu Lelièvre (born 2005), Canadian sledge hockey player
- Robert Lelièvre (1942–1973), French singer, songwriter and guitarist
