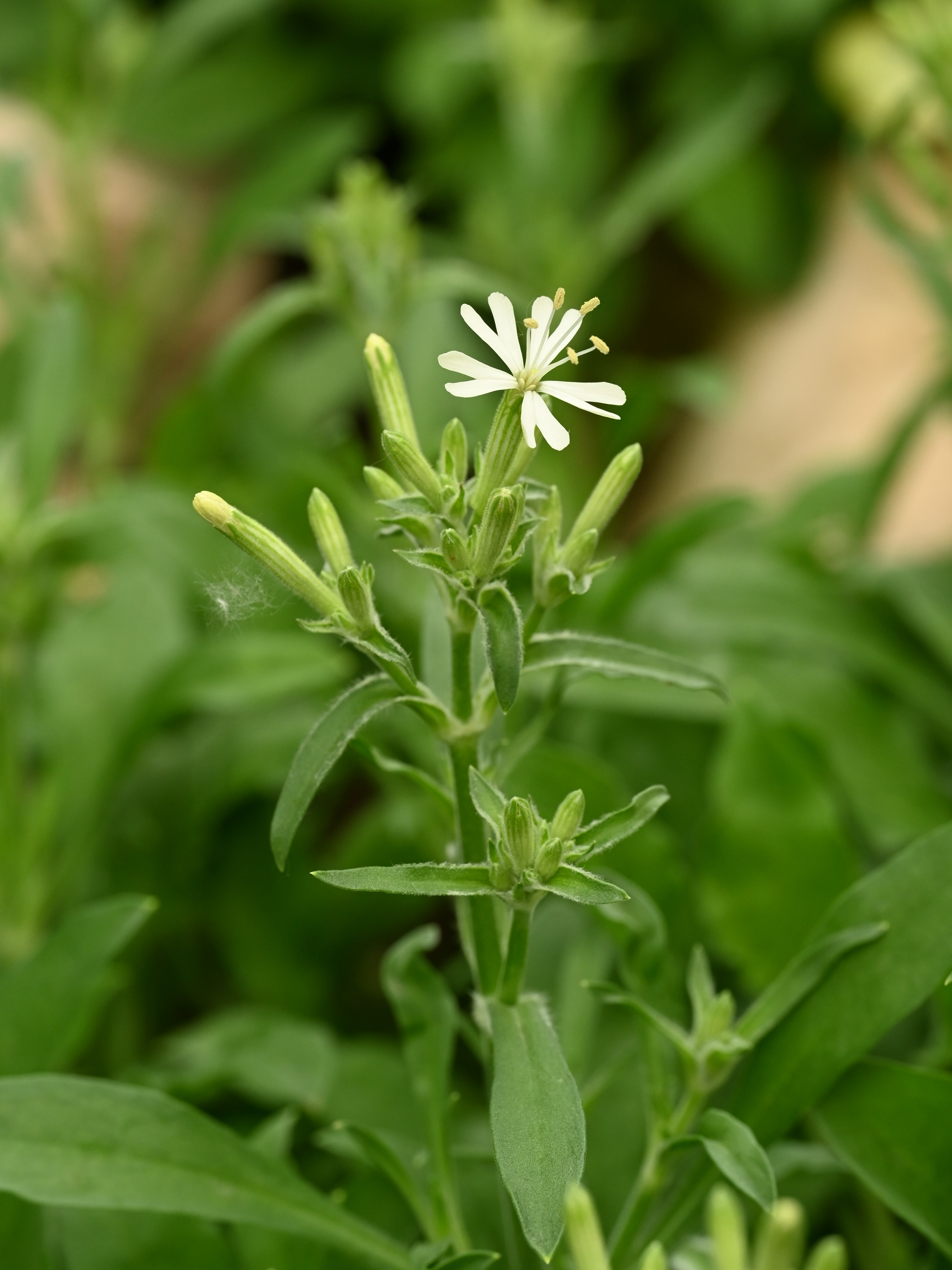

Scientific classification
- Kingdom: Plantae
- Clade: Tracheophytes
- Clade: Angiosperms
- Clade: Eudicots
- Order: Caryophyllales
- Family: Caryophyllaceae
- Genus: Silene
- Species: S. andryalifolia

Binomial name
- Silene andryalifolia Pomel (1875)

= Silene andryalifolia =

Species of plant

Silene andryalifolia is a species of subshrub native to Algeria, Morocco, Spain, Tunisia and it resides in temperate climate. The species is gynodioecious.
