= Lucet (surname) =

Lucet is a surname. Notable people with the surname include:

- Charles Lucet (1910–1990), French diplomat
- Élise Lucet (born 1963), French journalist and television host
- Marcel Lucet (1816–1883), French advocate and politician
