= Mikhail Larionov =

Russian painter and costume and set designer

- Михаил Ларионов
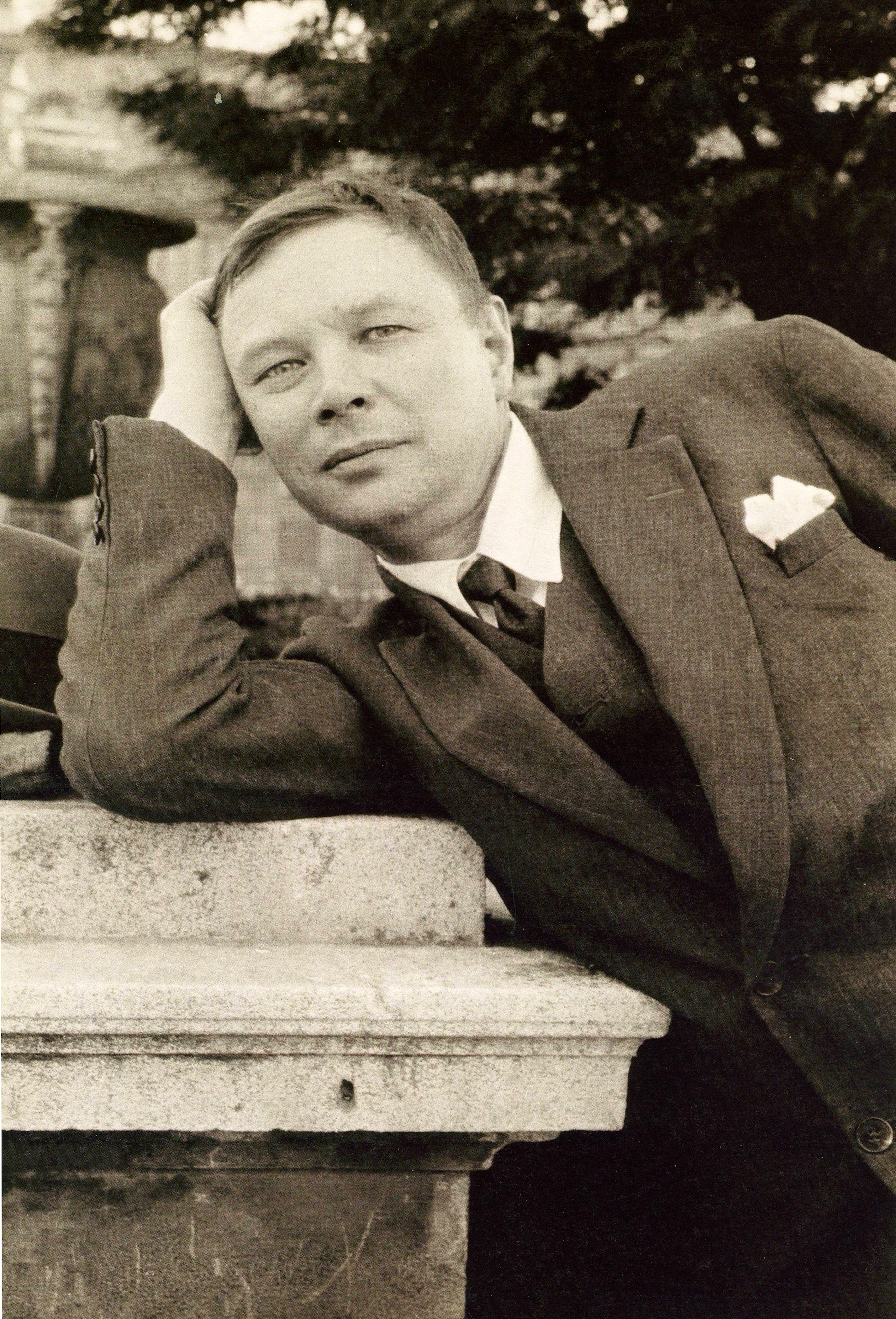
- Larionov c. 1916–1917
- Born: 3 June 1881; Tiraspol, Kherson Governorate, Russian Empire
- Died: 10 May 1964 (aged 82)); Fontenay-aux-Roses, France
- Resting place: Ivry Cemetery, Ivry-sur-Seine
- Education: Moscow School of Painting, Sculpture and Architecture; Isaac Levitan; Valentin Serov
- Known for: Painting, costume design, illustrator, set designer

Mikhail Fyodorovich Larionov (Russian: Михаи́л Фёдорович Ларио́нов; 3 June [O.S. 22 May] 1881 – 10 May 1964) was a Russian avant-garde painter who worked with radical exhibitors and pioneered the first approach to abstract Russian art. He was founding member of two important artistic groups Knave of Diamonds and the more radical Donkey's Tail. His lifelong partner was fellow avant-garde artist, Natalia Goncharova, with whom they worked on Sergei Diaghilev's Ballets Russes in France and Switzerland.

== Life and work ==
Larionov was born at Tiraspol, in the Kherson Governorate of the Russian Empire. In 1898 he entered the Moscow School of Painting, Sculpture and Architecture under Isaac Levitan and Valentin Serov. He was suspended three times for his radical outlook. In 1900 he met fellow avant-garde artist Natalia Goncharova and formed a lifelong relationship with her.

From 1902 his style was Impressionism. After a visit to Paris in 1906 he moved into Post-Impressionism and then a Neo-primitive style which derived partly from Russian sign painting. In 1908 he staged the Golden Fleece exhibition in Moscow, which included paintings by international avant-garde artists such as Matisse, Derain, Braque, Gauguin and Van Gogh. Other group shows promoted by him included Tatlin, Chagall and Malevich. He was especially a close friend and mentor to Tatlin; however, the latter broke off their relations in 1912 and started openly criticizing him, supposedly to escape Larionov's "monolithic authority".

Larionov was a founding member of two important Russian artistic groups Knave of Diamonds (1909–1917) and the more radical Donkey's Tail (1912–1914). He gave names to both groups. His first solo show was for one day in Moscow in 1911. He was influenced by the Georgian artist Niko Pirosmani.

Larionov then became influenced by the Cubo-Futurist art movement, and in 1913, with Natalia Goncharova, he invented Rayonism, which was the first creation of near-abstract art in Russia. He had a one-man show at the Omega Workshops. Around this time, Larionov was at the forefront of the Moscow avant-garde. He staged public performance art featuring participants with painted faces and dressed in eccentric clothes. He also took part in the production of the 1914 experimental film Drama in the Futurists' Cabaret No. 13, which integrated elements from the street performances.

In 1915 he left Russia and worked with the ballet owner Sergei Diaghilev in Paris on the productions of the Ballets Russes. He spent the rest of his life in France and obtained French citizenship. He died, aged 82, in the Paris suburb of Fontenay-aux-Roses.

In 2001, the Central Bank of Transnistria minted a silver coin honoring this native of today's Transnistria, as part of a series of memorable coins called The Outstanding People of Pridnestrovie.

The highest price paid for a Larionov painting at auction is 2,200,000 British pounds.

He is in the highest category "1A – a world famous artist" in "United Artists Rating". He is buried at Ivry Cemetery, Ivry-sur-Seine.

Acacias in Spring (1904)

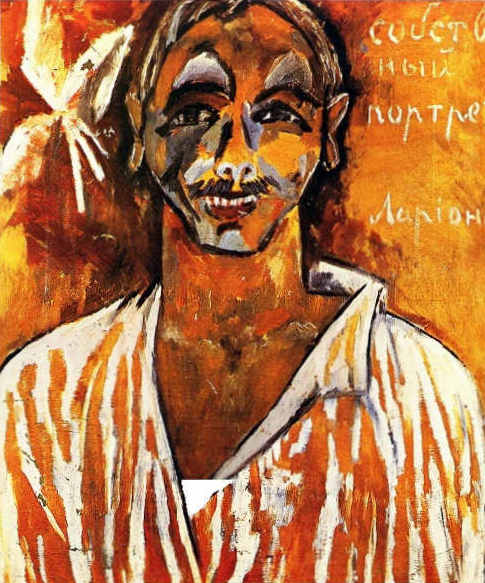
Self-Portrait (1910)

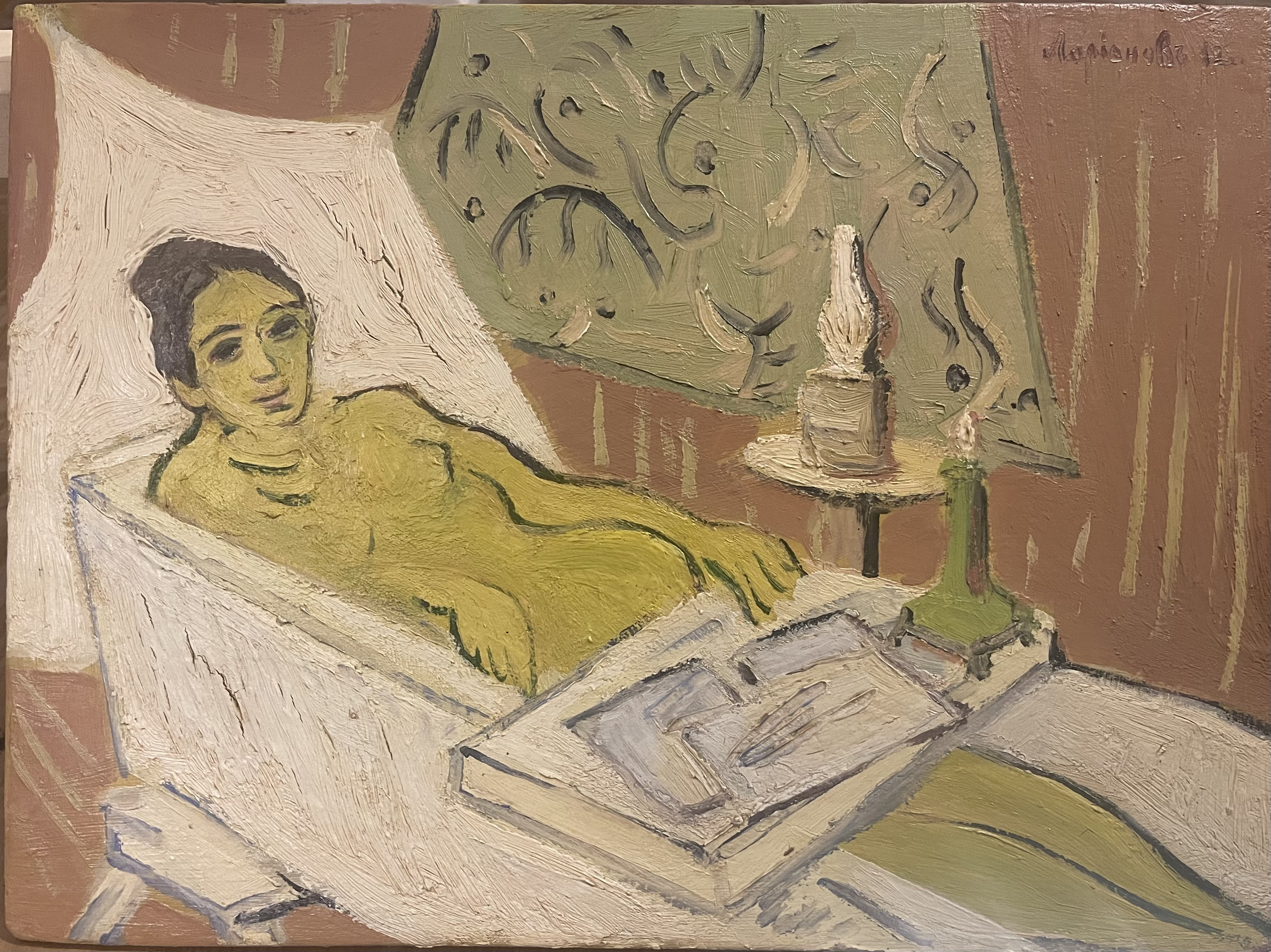
Study of a woman (1912)

Red Rayonism (1913)

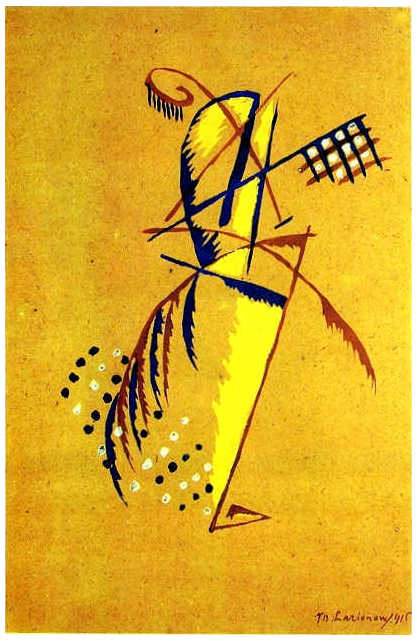
Dancer in motion (1915)

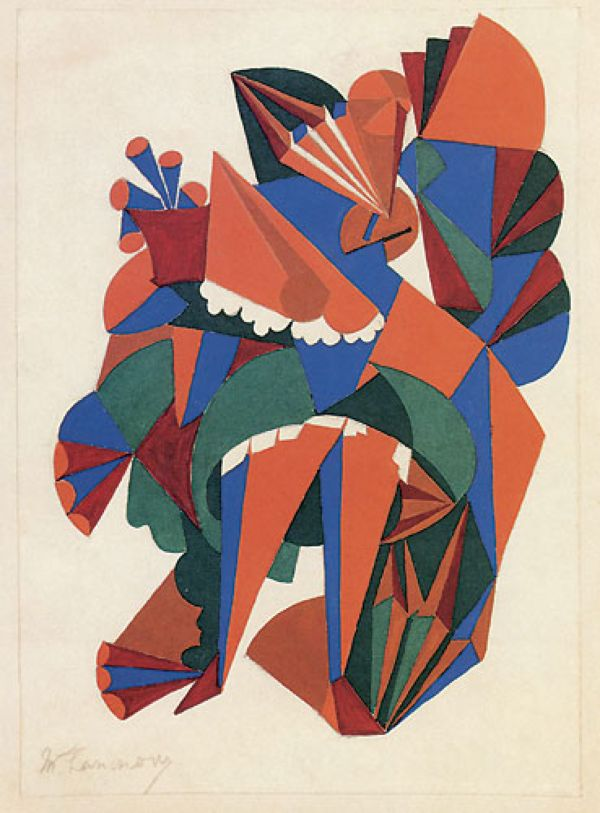
Lady with a fan (1916)

== See also ==
- List of Russian artists
