= Auguste Pomel =

French geologist, paleontologist and botanist

Nicolas Auguste Pomel
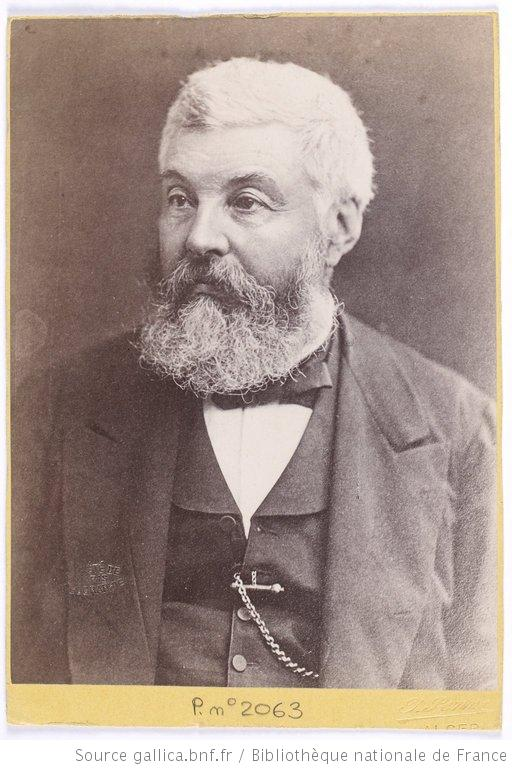

Senator of Algeria (Oran)
- In office 30 January 1876 – 7 January 1882
- Succeeded by: Rémy Jacques

Personal details
- Born: 20 September 1821 Issoire, Puy-de-Dôme, France
- Died: 2 August 1898 (aged 76) Draâ El Mizan, Algeria
- Occupation: Mining engineer, Geologist, paleontologist, botanist, politician

Nicolas Auguste Pomel (20 September 1821 – 2 August 1898) was a French geologist, paleontologist and botanist. He worked as a mines engineer in Algeria and became a specialist in north African vertebrate fossils. He was Senator of Algeria for Oran from 1876 to 1882.

== Life ==
Nicolas-Auguste Pomel was born in Issoire, Puy-de-Dôme, on 20 September 1821. He studied at the Lycée de Clermont and earned his licence ès sciences. He was conscripted into the army when he was prepared to enter the École des mines. He became a civil engineer after being released. After the coup d'état of 2 December 1851 his Republican beliefs earned him deportation. He became a Garde des mines in Oran in 1866, and was promoted to the 1st class in 1872. From 1876 to 1882 he was member of the Senate (Oran division). In 1882 he was tasked with geological mapping of Algeria. He died in Dra-el-Mizan.

Pomel was also a prolific botanist, naming and describing many plant species and some genera as well. The genus Pomelia (Durando ex Pomel) from the family Apiaceae is named in his honor.

== Published works ==
He was the author of nearly 100 publications on North Africa; his works include Sur les Alcyonaires fossiles Miocenes de l'Algerie (1868) and Des races indigènes de l'Algérie et du rôle que leur reservent leurs aptitudes (1871). Other written efforts by Pomel are:

- Catalogue méthodique et descriptif des vertébrés fossiles, 1853 – Catalog and description of vertebrate fossils.
- Classification méthodique et genera des échinides vivants et fossiles, 1883 – Classification of living and fossil Echinidae.
- Contributions a la classification méthodique des Crucifères, 1883 – Contributions to the methodical classification of Cruciferae.
- Une mission scientifique en Tunisie en 1877, 1884 – A scientific mission to Tunisia in 1877.
- Paléontologie ou description des animaux fossiles de l'Algérie, 1885–87 – Paleontology; a description of animal fossils from Algeria.
- Description stratigraphique générale de l'Algérie, 1889 – General stratigraphic description of Algeria.
- Caméliens et Cervidés, 1893 – Camelids and cervids.
- Les Rhinocéros quaternaire, 1895 – Quaternary rhinoceros.
- Les éléphants quaternaires, 1895 – Quaternary elephants.
- Singe et homme, 1896 – Monkeys and humans.
- Paléontologie ou description des animaux fossiles de la province d'Oran

== Sources ==
- Robert, Adolphe; Cougny, Gaston (1889–1891), "POMEL (NICOLAS-AUGUSTE))", in Edgar Bourloton (ed.), Dictionnaire des Parlementaires français (1789–1889) (in French)
- "Nicolas Auguste POMEL (1821-1896)". Le corps des mines aux XIXème et au XXème siècles.
