= Aïn Zaouia =

Aïn Zaouia عين الزاوية ⴰⵣⴰⵖⴰⵔ Azaγar
- City and Common
- Motto: "From the people, for the people"
- Location of Aïn Zaouia in the Tizi Ouzou Province

- Location of Aïn Zaouia in Algeria
- Coordinates: 36°33′00″N 3°53′40″E
- Country: Algeria
- Province: Tizi Ouzou Province
- District: Draâ El Mizan District
- APC: 2017-2022

Government
  - Type: Municipality
  - Mayor: Ali AMRANI (FLN)

Area
  - Total: 21.964 sq mi (56.887 km^{2})

Population (2014)
  - Total: 25,000
- Time zone: UTC+1 (CET)
- Postal code: 15056
- ISO 3166 code: CP

Aïn Zaouia is a town and commune in Tizi Ouzou Province in northern Algeria.
