= Marcel Lucet =

French advocate and politician

Jacques Marcel Lucet
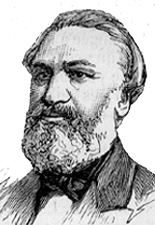

Representative of Algeria (Constantine)
- In office 1 February 1871 – 7 March 1876

Senator of Algeria (Constantine)
- In office 30 January 1876 – 10 July 1883
- Succeeded by: Dominique Forcioli

Personal details
- Born: 21 October 1816 Limousis, Aude France
- Died: Saint-Cloud, Hauts-de-Seine, France
- Occupation: Advocate, politician

Jacques Marcel Lucet (21 October 1816 – 10 July 1883) was a French advocate and politician. He was a committed Republican, supported the French Third Republic (1848–51), and was forced into exile during the Second French Empire, first in Italy and then in Algeria. During the French Third Republic he was deputy and then senator of the department of Constantine, Algeria, from 1871 to 1883.

== Early years (1816–51) ==
Jacques Lucet was born on 21 October 1816 in Limousis, Aude. He came from a prosperous family. He prepared for entry to the École Polytechnique, but then decided on a career at the bar. He completed his studies in law at Toulouse, and in 1842 became an advocate in Toulouse, where he pleaded in many political cases.

With the February Revolution of 1848 Lucet became the private secretary of his friend Jean-François Joly^{(fr)}, who had been named commissioner of five departments in the region. On 23 April 1848 Lucet ran unsuccessfully for election to the Constituent Assembly. He was an enthusiastic republican, and contributed excellent articles to the journal l'Émancipation. In the summer of 1848 Lucet led a group of radical republicans who split from the liberal republicans of Émancipation and formed their own newspaper, Le Constituent démocratique.

In Toulouse during the fall of 1848 in the lead-up to the presidential elections conservative republicans supported Louis Napoleon Bonaparte, liberals supported General Louis-Eugène Cavaignac, while radicals led by Lucet and Armand Duportal^{(fr)} led the campaign for Alexandre Auguste Ledru-Rollin. Lucet was prosecuted for his attacks on the 1849 Italian expedition that destroyed the short-lived Roman Republic and spent six months in preventative detention before being tried by the cour d'assises, where he was defended by Jules Favre.

== Second Empire (1851–70) ==
Lucet participated in hostile demonstrations in Toulouse during the coup d'état of 2 December 1851, and after 10 December 1851 strongly opposed Prince Louis-Napoleon. He was arrested and sentenced to exile by a joint committee. Lucet spent six years in Italy, then settled in Constantine, Algeria, where his two brothers were officers in the Army of Africa, and where he had friends who shared his political opinions. He bought land and created large farms, and in 1862 was named president of the Constantine agricultural fair, an organization that had been established due to his initiative. He was in turn municipal councilor and general councilor of the department.

Lucet was involved in the struggle for a civil regime to replace military rule. He believed that only a civil regime could ensure the prosperity of the colony. In 1863 he published a pamphlet on the subject Colonisation européenne de l'Algérie. In April 1870 Lucet and Jules Favre pleaded in the notorious case of the Oued-Mahouine before the Constantine Council of War, and attacked the policies of the Arab Bureau (bureaux arabes). (Note: Massacre of Oued-Mahouine: On 15 April 1869 a caravan that had left Tébessa in Algeria en route to Gafsa in Tunisia was attacked in the Oued-Mahouine by about 150 'Allaouna and Brarcha horsemen of the Nemencha confederation. Almost all the members of the caravan were killed.)

== Third Republic (1870–83) ==
After the fall of the Second French Empire, on 6 September 1870 Lucet was appointed Prefect of Constantine. He resigned on 28 December 1870 so he could run for election to the National Assembly. On 1 February 1871 Lucet was elected to represent Constantine in the National Assembly. He sat with the Opportunist Republican parliamentary group, Gauche républicaine. He voted against the peace treaty, against the resignation of Adolphe Thiers, against the septennat^{(fr)}, for the return to Paris, for the amendment of Pascal Pierre Duprat and for the constitutional laws. He was a member of several committees, and was the rapporteur of the law concerning migration of people from Alsace-Lorraine to Algeria. He was Representative of Algeria until 7 March 1876.

The law of 24 February 1875 gave each department of Algeria a senator. Lucet was elected Senator of Algeria for the department of Constantine on 30 January 1876 by 42 votes against 26 for General de Lacroix. He was reelected in the triennial renewal of 5 January 1879 by 41 votes against 36 for M. du Bouzet. In the Senate he sat with the left and voted with the advanced Republican faction. He opposed the dissolution of the chamber demanded by the ministry of Albert de Broglie on 23 June 1877. Lucet died in office on 10 July 1883 in Saint-Cloud, Hauts-de-Seine. He was replaced in the senate on 7 October 1883 by Dominique Forcioli.

== Publications ==
Lucet was the author of various reports or proposals to the Assembly or the Senate. A sample of these and other publications:

- Marcel Lucet (1863), Colonisation européenne de l'Algérie : légitime défense, Paris: Challamel aîné, p. 24
- Marcel Lucet (1863), Comice agricole de l'arrondissement de Constantine (Algérie) (Séance du 1er février 1863), Constantine: impr. de L. Marle / Comice agricole. Constantine, Algérie, p. 12
- Marcel Lucet (1866), Projet d'institution de crédit foncier agricole en Algérie, Constantine: impr. de L. Marle, p. 32
- Marcel Lucet (1872), La question algérienne en 1872 (discussion entre M. Lucet et M. de Gueydon en présence de M. Thiers, le 24 octobre 1872), Constantine: impr. de L. Marle, p. 24
- Marcel Lucet (1875), Rapport fait au nom de la commission du budget, sur le budget des dépenses de l'exercice 1876 (ministère de l'intérieur, gouvernement général civil de l'Algérie), Versaille: Impr. de Cerf et fils / France. Assemblée nationale, p. 48
- Marcel Lucet (1876), Rapport fait au nom de la Commission des finances sur le budget des dépenses de l'exercice 1877 (ministère de l'intérieur, Algérie), Versaille: Impr. de A. Bourdilliat / France. Sénat, p. 43
- Marcel Lucet (1880), Rapport fait, au nom de la Commission chargée d'examiner le projet de loi, adopté par la Chambre des députés, relatif à la Banque d'Algérie (Sénat, session 2 mars 1880, n ° 88), Paris: Impr. de P. Mouillot / France. Sénat, p. 48

== Sources ==
- "Alger", Annuaire encyclopédique (in French), vol. IX, Directeurs de l'Encyclopédie du XIXe siècle, 1872
- Aminzade, Ronald (1993-09-12), Ballots and Barricades: Class Formation and Republican Politics in France, 1830-1871, Princeton University Press, ISBN 0-691-02871-0
- Faucon, Narcisse (1890), "Lucet", Le livre d'or de l'Algérie: histoire politique, militaire, administrative; événements et faits principaux; biographie des hommes ayant marqué dans l'armée, les sciences, les lettres, etc., de 1830 à 1889 (in French), A. Challamel
- LUCET Jacques (in French), Sénat de France
- Marcel, Jacques Lucet (in French), Assemblée nationale
- Marcel Lucet (1816-1883) - Auteur du texte (in French), BnF: Bibliotheque nationales de France
- Robert, Adolphe; Cougny, Gaston (1889–1891), "LUCET (JACQUES-MARCEL)", in Edgar Bourloton (ed.), Dictionnaire des Parlementaires français (1789–1889) (in French)
