= Dominique Forcioli =

French lawyer and politician

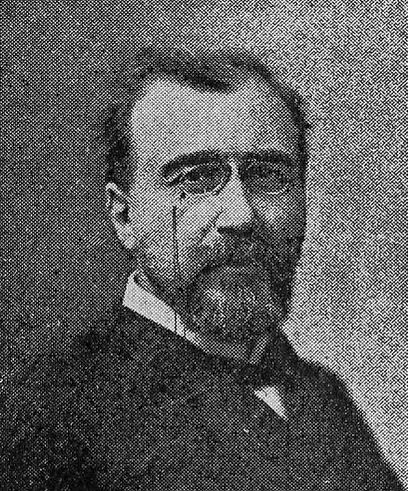

Senator of Algeria (Constantine)
- In office 7 October 1883 – 1 January 1888
- Preceded by: Marcel Lucet
- Succeeded by: Georges Lesueur

Deputy of Algeria
- In office 22 September 1889 – 31 May 1898
- Succeeded by: Gaston Thomson

Deputy of Corsica
- In office 22 January 1905 – 31 May 1910
- Preceded by: Emmanuel Arène
- Succeeded by: Dominique Pugliesi-Conti

Personal details
- Born: 6 June 1838 Ajaccio, Corsica, France
- Died: 9 November 1917 (aged 79) Ajaccio, Corsica France
- Occupation: Lawyer, politician

Dominique Forcioli (6 April 1838 – 9 November 1917) was a French lawyer and left-wing politician. He was Senator of Algeria from 1883 to 1888, Deputy of Algeria from 1889 to 1898, and Deputy of Corsica from 1905 to 1910.

== Life ==
Dominique Forcioli was born on 6 April 1838 in Ajaccio, Corsica. He became an advocate in Constantine, Algeria. In the general elections of 21 August 1881 he ran as a radical candidate for the 1st constituency of the Constantine department, but won only 1,676 votes against the incumbent Gaston Thomson, the candidate of the Opportunist Republicans. Thomson was also elected in the 2nd constituency of Constantine, which he chose to represent. There was a by-election in the 1st constituency on 4 December 1881 which the Opportunist candidate Alcide Marie Treille^{(fr)} won by 2,421 votes against 2,298 for Forcioli.

=== Senator of Algeria ===
On 7 October 1883 Forcioli ran in a senatorial by-election in the department of Constantine to replace Marcel Lucet, who had died. He was elected by 53 votes out of 97. He sat with the small group of the extreme left, and supported the Republican cabinets. He supported the policies of General Boulanger. In the triennial renewal Senate elections on 5 January 1888 Forcioli lost by 89 votes against 94 for Georges Lesueur, who was elected.

=== Deputy of Algeria ===
In the 22 September 1889 general elections Forcioli ran as a Radical Socialist and Revisionist, and was elected Deputy of Constantine in the first round by 4,029 votes out of 6,106. He was a member of the Naval Committee. He now expressed opposition to General Boulanger. From his position on the questions of Tunisia and Tonkin he must be considered a leader of the nascent colonial group.

In the 20 August 1893 elections he was reelected in the first round by 3,753 votes out of 6,862. He was particularly involved in improvements to the marine and postal services of Algeria and Corsica, and increases in credits for colonization and administration of Algeria. He insisted on the need for the Algerian government to be controlled by a body of elected representatives. In the general election of 8 May 1898 Forcioli won only 4,885 votes against 5,130 for the journalist Thomson, who was elected in the first round.

=== Deputy of Corsica ===
Forcioli ran in the Corsican legislative by-election of 11 January 1902 to replace Emmanuel Arène, who had been elected Senator of Corsica. He was easily elected as Deputy of Ajaccio by 7,894 votes out of 9,730. In the Chamber he voted for the law that introduced two years of military service and for the law on separation of church and state. He was reelected in the second round of the general elections of 6 May 1906 by 7,395 votes against 5,718 for M. Casanelli d'Istria. He became a member of the judicial reform committee.

Forcioli ran in a senatorial by-election in 1909 to replace two Corsican senators, Arthur Ranc and Emmanuel Arène, who had died. Thadée Gabrielli and Nicolas Péraldi were elected, Gabrielli with 678 votes and Péraldi with 530, Forcioli was the nearest runner-up with 259. He was defeated in the 8 May 1910 elections by Dominique Pugliesi-Conti^{(fr)}, mayor of Ajaccio. After this he retired from politics. Forcioli died on 9 November 1917 in Ajaccio, Corsica.

== Publications ==
Publications by Forcioli as a Senator or Deputy included:

- Forcioli (1885), M. Jules Ferry est-il coupable ? Oui, Paris: impr. de V. Goupy et Jourdan, p. 31
- Forcioli (1885), Rapport fait, au nom de la commission chargée d'examiner le projet de loi, adopté par la Chambre des députés, ayant pour objet : 1 ° la déclaration d'utilité publique des travaux d'agrandissement du port de Bône; 2 ° l'acceptation des offres financières de la ville et de la Chambre de commerce de Bône tendant à assurer la rapide exécution desdits travaux; 3 ° l'autorisation à accorder à la ville et à la chambre de commerce de contracter, la première, un emprunt de 1,600,000 francs, la seconde, un emprunt de 1,500,000 francs pour la réalisation de leurs engagements (Sénat. Session 1885. N ° 491), Paris: Impr. de P. Mouillot / Sénat, p. 10
- Forcioli (1887), Rapport fait, au nom de la Commission chargée d'examiner : 1 ° la proposition de loi, de M. le Cte d'Haussonville relative au mode d'aliénation des terres domaniales de colonisation en Algérie; 2 ° le projet de loi, ayant pour objet d'assurer le développement de la colonisation en Algérie à l'aide de ressources domaniales (Sénat. Session extraordinaire 1887. N ° 57), Paris: Impr. de P. Mouillot / Sénat, p. 82
- Forcioli (1890), Rapport fait au nom de la commission chargée d'examiner la proposition de loi adoptée par le Sénat, ayant pour objet de modifier le mode de prestation de serment devant les cours et tribunaux (Chambre des Députés, 5e législature, session 1890, n ° 839), Paris: Motteroz / Chambre des députés, p. 20
- Alfred Letellier; Forcioli; Saint Germain; Pourquery de Boisserin (1893), Proposition de loi relative aux circonstances atténuantes (Chambre des Députés, 5e législature, session 1893, n ° 2664), Paris: Motteroz / Chambre des députés, p. 22

== Sources ==
- Dominique Forcioli (in French), Assemblée nationale
- Dominique Forcioli (1838-1917) (in French), BnF: Bibliotheque nationale de France
- Jolly, Jean, ed. (1960), "Forcioli (Dominique)", dictionnaire des parlementaires français de 1889 à 1940, Presses universitaires de France
- Jolly, Jean, ed. (1960b), "Gabrielli (Thadée, Jean, Auguste)", dictionnaire des parlementaires français de 1889 à 1940, Presses universitaires de France
- Persell, Stuart Michael (1983), The French Colonial Lobby, 1889-1938, Hoover Press, ISBN 978-0-8179-7833-4
- Robert, Adolphe; Cougny, Gaston (1889–1891), "Forcioli (Dominique)", in Edgar Bourloton (ed.), Dictionnaire des Parlementaires français (1789–1889) (in French)
