= Boufhaima =

Village in Tizi Ouzou Province, Algeria

Coordinates: 36°33′7.5″N 3°48′23.8″E

Boufhaima is a village linked administratively to nearby Draâ El Mizan District, Tizi Ouzou Province, Algeria, 4 km from Tizi ghenif 7 km. It was settled in 1873 by the French, during the French occupation of Algeria. In this place was the Beauprêtre column, which commemorates the battle of 8 April 1864, where this officer perished, and which began the insurrection of Ouled Sidi Cheich. At first six French settlers settled there (some settlers, civil servants, medical professions) the Muslim population constituted an overwhelming majority and had a poor standard of living.

Boufhaima coordinates: Latitude: 36°33'3.83" Longitude: 3°48'31.74" Elevation: 390 meters (1,280 feet)

Boufhaima is located on national road RN 68 between Draa El Mizan and Issers going towards Algiers. During the French occupation, the French settlers built a primary school and a so-called source Thala Frasse which means in French source of France, located along the RN68, on the eastern end of the village Boufhaima, the virtues of its water are recognized by everyone, so that even where not only Boufhaima families come into stock up every day but also the many foreign drivers or passing do not hesitate, at every opportunity, to stop to drink it and leave with full jerrycans " These recent months, the village of Boufhaima lives in connection with the installation of the East-West highway projects, in an atmosphere of dream and imagination. This highway would link the east-west highway to the city of Tizi Ouzou, along a distance of 48 km "30" miles through boufhaima will shorten the journey time to Algiers. While so far this village was completely ignored despite its strategic location on a busy road, the fact remains that except a few small grocery stores that could be count on the fingers of one hand and the small mosque, nothing can draw the attention of users of other villages of the same scale.
