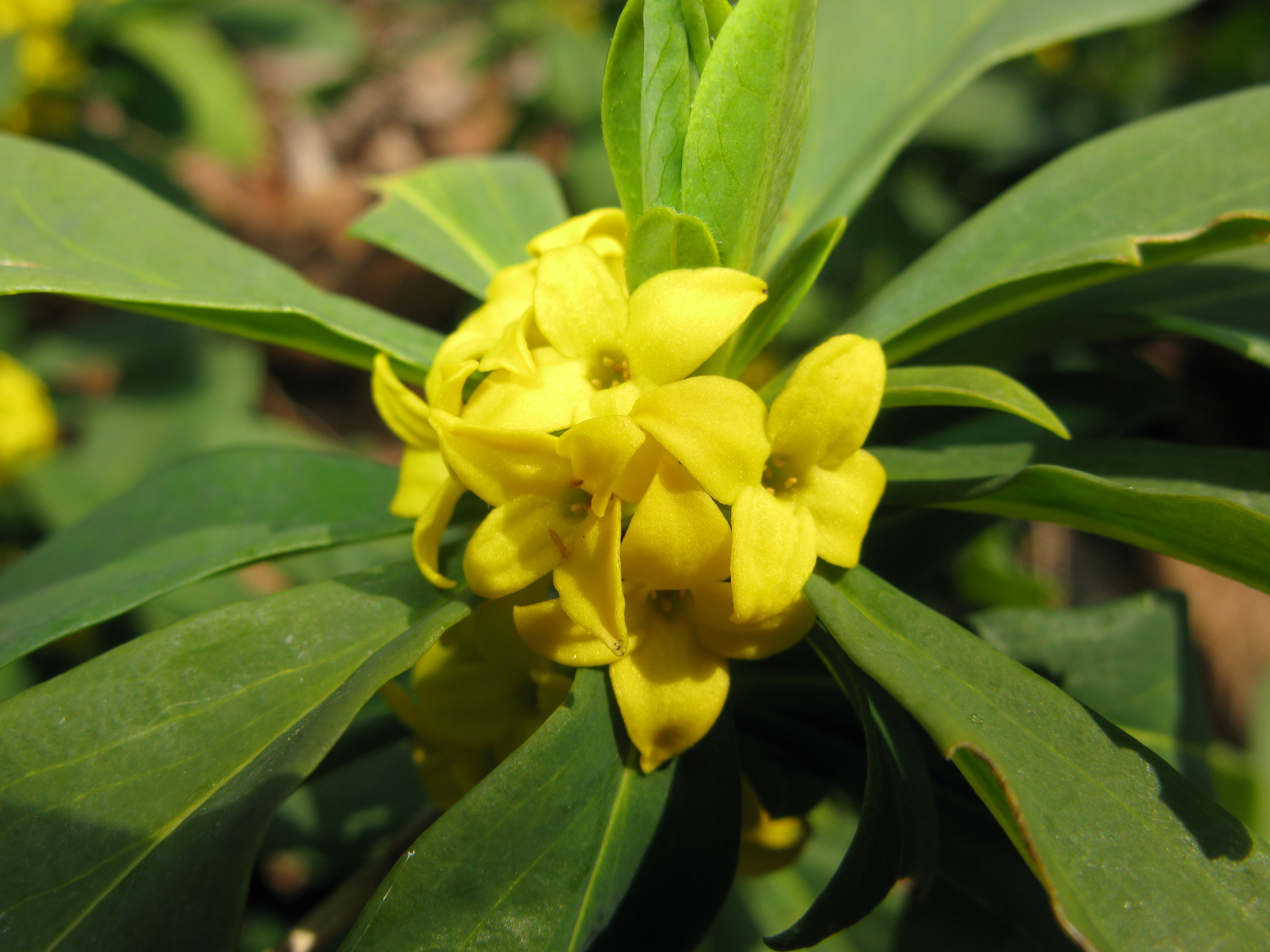

Scientific classification
- Kingdom: Plantae
- Clade: Tracheophytes
- Clade: Angiosperms
- Clade: Eudicots
- Clade: Rosids
- Order: Malvales
- Family: Thymelaeaceae
- Genus: Daphne
- Species: D. jezoensis

Binomial name
- Daphne jezoensis Maxim.

Synonyms
- Homotypic Synonyms: Daphne kamtschatica subsp. jezoensis (Maxim.) Vorosch.; Daphne kamtschatica var. jezoensis (Maxim.) Ohwi; Daphne pseudomezereum var. jezoensis (Maxim.) Hamaya; Heterotypic Synonyms: Daphne kamtschatica var. rebunensis (Tatew.) H.Hara in Enum. Spermatophytarum Japon. 3: 231 (1954); Daphne rebunensis Tatew.

= Daphne jezoensis =

Species of shrub

Daphne jezoensis is a species of shrub, of the family Thymelaeaceae. It is native to northern Japan and parts of eastern Russia.

It has been treated as either a subspecies or a variety of Daphne kamtschatica.

== Description ==
The shrub is summer deciduous, and grows from 0.4 to 0.6 m tall. Its leaves are blue-green in color and its flowers are bright yellow. It is often found in deciduous forests with humus rich soil.
