= Drama in the Futurists' Cabaret No. 13 =

1914 Russian avant-garde film

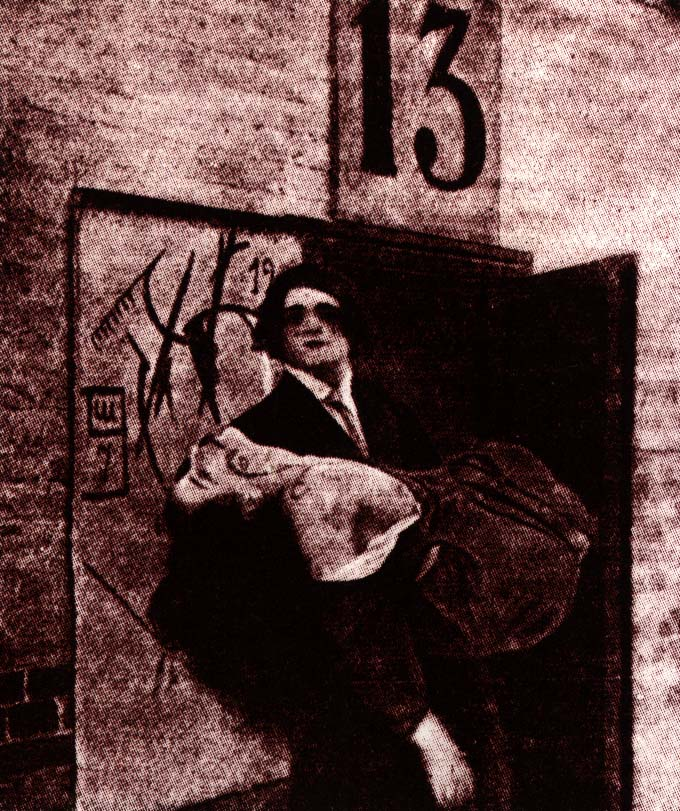
- One of the surviving frames; the man is Vsevolod Maksimovich and the woman is N. Elsner
- Russian: Драма в кабаре футуристов № 13
- Directed by: Vladimir Kasyanov
- Starring: Vsevolod Maksimovich (lead role); David Burliuk; Vladimir Burliuk; Natalia Goncharova; Mikhail Larionov; Vladimir Mayakovsky
- Cinematography: Alphonse Winkler
- Release date: 1914
- Country: Russian Empire
- Language: Russian

Drama in the Futurists' Cabaret No. 13 (Russian: Драма в кабаре футуристов № 13) is a 1914 Russian silent film directed by Vladimir Kasyanov. It is probably the world's first avant-garde film.

RoseLee Goldberg notes the film I Want to Be a Futurist was the Futurist sequel to Drama in Cabaret No. 13.

== Plot ==
The film opened with a cabaret sequence in which the artists paint their faces in preparation for the evening’s entertainment. A caption reads: "13 O’clock has struck.

It contained some poetry reading and dance performances. The story itself begins with a 'Futurist Dance of Death'. Larionov and a woman (Maximovich) dance on a table, they lunge at one another with knives, and Maximovich is killed. Then comes the 'Futurist burial': Larionov carries Maximovich's body out, kisses her and leaves her in the snow. Larionov is expelled from Futurism. He takes poison and dies. The other Futurists depart, stepping over his body, on which a note is pinned: 'Expelled from Futurism'. Maximovich's corpse is seen, also with a note pinned to it: 'A victim of Futurism'.

The plot of the movie is unknown, despite the fact that this film is only partially lost: just a few frames have survived.

== Cast ==
- Vsevolod Maksymovych in the lead role
- David Burliuk
- Vladimir Burliuk
- Natalia Goncharova
- Mikhail Larionov
- Vladimir Mayakovsky
- Ilya Zdanevich
- Vadim Shershenevich
- Anton Lotov

== History ==
N. Toporkov and Alphonse Winckler borrowed money to make the film. This film included all the prominent Futurists, and was a comic-grotesque parody of filmic melodrama.

The film was shot in late 1913 in one of the Moscow café-cabarets and that featured.
