= Natalia Goncharova =

Russian-French artist (1881–1962)

- Наталья Гончарова
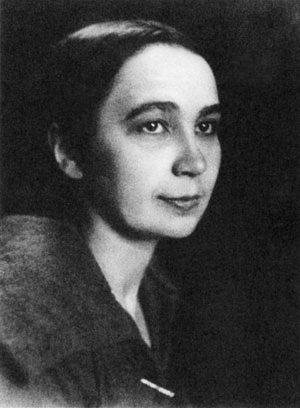
- Goncharova in 1910
- Born: Natalia Sergeevna Goncharova; 3 July 1881; Nagaevo, Tula Governorate, Russian Empire
- Died: 17 October 1962 (aged 81); Paris, France
- Resting place: Ivry Cemetery, Ivry-sur-Seine, France
- Education: Moscow Institute of Painting, Sculpture and Architecture
- Known for: Painting, costume design, writer, illustrator, set designer
- Movement: Russian Futurism, Rayonism, Primitivism

Natalia Sergeevna Goncharova (Russian: Ната́лья Серге́евна Гончаро́ва, IPA: [nɐˈtalʲjə sʲɪrˈɡʲe(j)ɪvnə ɡənʲtɕɪˈrovə]; 3 July 1881 – 17 October 1962) was a Russian avant-garde artist, painter, costume designer, writer, illustrator, and set designer. Goncharova's lifelong partner was fellow Russian avant-garde artist Mikhail Larionov. She was a founding member of both the Jack of Diamonds (1909–1911), Moscow's first radical independent exhibiting group, the more radical Donkey's Tail (1912–1913), and with Larionov invented Rayonism (1912–1914). She was also a member of the German-based art movement Der Blaue Reiter. Born in Russia, she moved to Paris in 1921 and lived there until her death.

Her painting vastly influenced the avant-garde in Russia. Her exhibitions held in Moscow and St Petersburg (1913 and 1914) were the first promoting a "new" artist by an independent gallery. When it came to the pre-revolutionary period in Russia, where decorative painting and icons were a secure profession, her modern approach to rendering icons was both transgressive and problematic. She was one of the leading figures in the avant-garde in Russia and carried this influence with her to Paris.

== Early life ==
Natalia Sergeevna Goncharova was born on 3 July 1881 (the same year as Larionov, Picasso, and Léger), in Nagaevo (now in the Chernsky District of Tula Oblast). Her father, Sergey Mikhaylovich Goncharov, was an architect and graduate of the prestigious Moscow Institute of Painting, Sculpture and Architecture. Goncharova moved to Moscow at the age of 10 in 1892; she graduated from the Fourth Women's Gymnasium in 1898. Goncharova was a great grandniece to Natalia Pushkina (née Goncharova).

Her immediate family were highly educated and considered themselves politically liberal. Her father designed and built their home, where both Natalia and her brother Afanasii grew up. They were both raised and educated by their mother and grandmother. They lived in the Orlov and Tula provinces, and soon Goncharova moved to Moscow to pursue the Fourth Women's Gymnasium in 1892, from which she graduated in 1898. She tried several career paths (zoology, history, botany, and medicine), before deciding on sculpture.

== Education ==
She was accepted by the Moscow School of Painting, Sculpture and Architecture in the autumn of 1901, where she studied to become a sculptor under Pavel Trubetskoi, who was associated with the World of Art movement. By 1903, she began exhibiting in major Russian salons, and in 1903–04 she was awarded a silver medal for sculpture. It was at the Moscow School of Painting, Sculpture and Architecture that Goncharova met fellow-student Mikhail Larionov, and it was not long before they began sharing a studio and living space.

At the end of the century the gender segregation in the official art institutions was no longer implemented, but still denied women the right to get the diploma upon the completion. She withdrew from the Moscow School of Painting, Sculpture and Architecture in 1909, in favor of classes at Ilya Mashkov and Alexander Mikhailovsky's studios, where she was able to study male and female nudes, and was trained the equivalent of what she would have learnt upon completion at the Moscow School had she been male. In 1910, a number of students were expelled from Konstantin Korovin's portrait class for imitating the contemporary style of European Modernism, with Goncharova, Larionov, Robert Falk, Pyotr Konchalovsky, Alexander Kuprin, Ilya Mashkov amongst them.

== Participation in avant-garde movements ==
=== Jack of Diamonds and Donkey's Tail ===
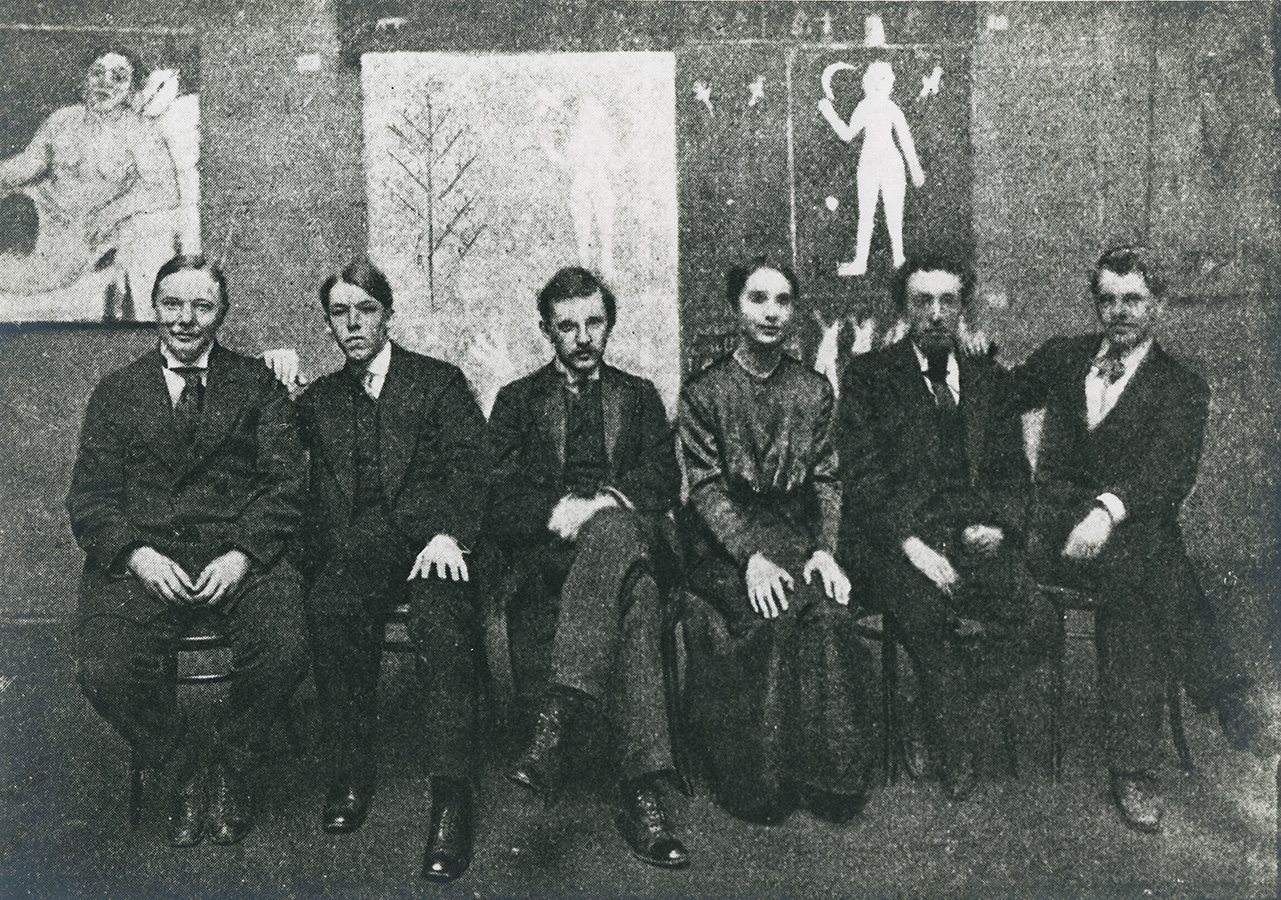
Goncharova and other artists at a Donkey's Tail exhibition, 1912

The students rejected from Korovin's classes, and others, soon formed Moscow's first radical independent exhibiting group, the Jack of Diamonds, which was named by Larionov. This is a rather provocative name, as it alludes to both boulevard literature and prison uniforms.

The Jack of Diamonds' first exhibition (December 1910–January 1911) included Primitivist and Cubist paintings by Goncharova, but the group split in half in 1912, Mikhail Larionov distancing from Aristarkh Lentulov and Pyotr Konchalovsky and forming a more provocative group, the Donkey's Tail. At the latter group's first exhibition (March–April 1912) organized by Larionov, more than fifty of her paintings were on display. Goncharova drew inspirations for primitivism from Russian icons and folk art, otherwise known as luboks. The Donkey's Tail was conceived as an intentional break from European art influence and the establishment of an independent Russian school of modern art. The exhibition proved controversial, and the censor confiscated Goncharova's religiously-themed work, The Evangelists (1910–11), deeming it blasphemous partly because it was hung at an exhibition titled after the rear end of a donkey, partly because it blended sacred and profane imagery, and also because there were taboos for women to paint icons.

=== Russian Futurism and Rayonism ===
Goncharova and her partner, Larionov, were continuously harassed for their artwork and the way they expressed themselves. However, the influence of Russian Futurism is much in evidence in Goncharova's later paintings. Initially preoccupied with icon painting and the primitivism of ethnic Russian folk-art, Goncharova soon began to mix Cubist and Futurist elements in her work, which led to the beginnings of Cubo-Futurism. In Russia, she was to become famous for her work in this style, such as Cyclist. In 1911, she and Larionov developed Rayonism, and produced many paintings in that style. As leaders of the Russian Futurists, they organized provocative lecture evenings in the same vein as their Italian counterparts. Goncharova was also involved with graphic design—writing, and illustrated several avant-garde books.

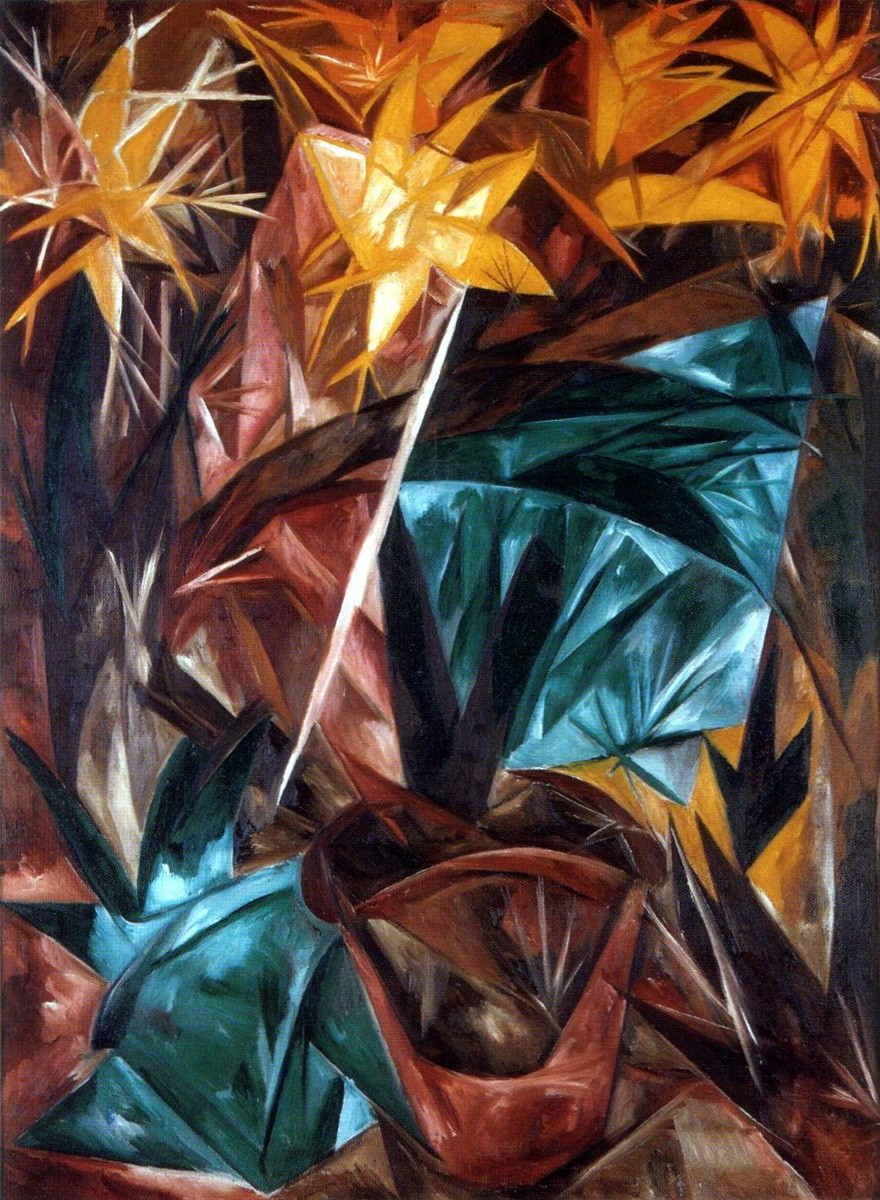
Rayonist Lilies, 1913

Another important exhibition Goncharova participated in is called The Target (March–April 1913) and No. 4 (March–April 1914). She played a very important role when it came to Russian art at the time. Her aesthetic choices that were bridging the Eastern and Western traditions, served as a catalyst for manifestos and art movements at the time. She was one of the leading artists in Cubo-Futurist (Airplane over a Train, 1912) and Rayonist (Yellow and Green Forest, 1913) circles.

Even though her pre-World War I art still had problematic associations, her participation in these exhibits were a segue for Moscow's avant-garde blending of both Western European Modernism and Eastern traditions. In one of her interviews, she said that she got inspiration from Picasso, Le Fauconnier, and Braque, but still her first "Cubist" works to date as long as one year before that.

She was also notorious for her occasionally shocking public behaviour. When Goncharova and Larionov first became interested in Primitivism, they painted hieroglyphics and flowers on their faces and walked through the streets; Goncharova herself sometimes appeared topless in public with symbols on her chest as part of her manifesto "Why We Paint Our Faces".

She exhibited at the Salon d'Automne (Exposition de L'art Russe) in 1906.

=== Later career and death ===
Goncharova was a member of the avant-garde Der Blaue Reiter group from its founding in 1911. In 1915, she began to design ballet costumes and sets in Geneva. In 1915 she started work on a series of designs – Six Winged Seraph, Angel, St Andrew, St Mark, Nativity, and others – for a ballet commissioned by Sergei Diaghilev, to be titled Liturgy. Also involved in the project, for which Igor Stravinsky was invited to compose the score, were Larionov and Léonide Massine, but the ballet never materialized. Goncharova moved to Paris in 1921 where she designed a number of stage sets of Diaghilev's Ballets Russes. She also exhibited at the Salon d'Automne in 1921, and participated regularly at the Salon des Tuileries and the Salon des Indépendants.

Goncharova also identified with Everythingism (russ. Vsechestvo), the Russian avant-garde movement. Everythingism was considered as an extension of Neo-Primitivism. This art promotes heterogeneity, a blending of multiple cultural traditions, such as West and East and different styles such as Cubism and Futurism. It aspired to erase the boundaries between what is considered the origin and the copy, and assimilated those together. It was an art movement that was free of already set artistic laws.

Together with Larionov, she left Russia and went to Paris on 29 April 1914. In that year she designed costumes and sets for the Ballets Russes's premiere of The Golden Cockerel in the city. Goncharova and Larionov collaborated on four events in Paris for the benefit of the Union des Artistes Russes. These events were the Grand Bal des Artistes or the Grand Bal Travesti Transmental (23 February 1923), the Bal Banal (14 March 1924), the Bal Olympique or the Vrai Bal Sportif (11 July 1924), and the Grand Ourse Bal (8 May 1925). They both designed much of the publicity materials for the event.

Between 1922 and 1926, Goncharova created fashion designs for Marie Cuttoli's shop, Maison Myrbor on the Rue Vincent, Paris. Her richly embroidered and appliquéd dress designs were strongly influenced by Russian folk art, Byzantine mosaic and her work for the Ballets Russes.

In 1938 Goncharova became a French national. On 2 June 1955, four years after Larionov suffered a stroke, the two artists got married in Paris to safeguard their rights of inheritance. Influenced by the School of Paris, her style moved from Cubism nearer to Neoclassicism. Goncharova was the first of the pair to die, seven years later, on 17 October 1962, in Paris after a debilitating struggle with rheumatoid arthritis.

== Style ==
Contradictions between country life and city life left a residue in Goncharova's artistic production and places it within European and Russian Modernism of that time. The urban Moscow, fast-paced life, and the relaxed summer retreats in the country are highly apparent in her art. Photographs of her in the family estate show her wearing peasant clothes in combination with city shoes. Her early self-portraits deal with identity, where her interest in elite masquerades is revealed. In one she dresses as a gentlewoman; in other, she is in a domestic environment wearing a dress; others focus on her identity as a painter (for example Self-Portrait with Yellow Lilies, 1907.)

Her early pastels and painting are influenced by the family main estate in Kaluga province, called Polotnianyi Zavod. The description of the life there suggests that the leisure part and the work part blurred together, and as such may be associated with the liberal reforms in Russia of the time. The inspiration Goncharova draws from the lifestyle is mostly taken from observing the everyday activities of the servants and peasants who lived there. That is evident in the number of her gardening images that can be identified with the landscape of this property.

== Fashion and costume designer ==
Goncharova had a successful career in fashion, where she was producing costumes for the Ballets Russes. The style was influenced by her involvement in the avant-garde in combination with her Russian heritage. In France, she worked for Marie Cuttolis's shop at House of Myrbor (Maison de Myrbor), where her Slavic heritage influenced the abstract design that was favored by the avant-garde.

She also worked for a famous designer Nadejda Lamonava in Moscow, where her completely artistic expression came to life. She experimented with abstract design, colors, patterns, different combinations of material, and evidently reacting against the prevailing fashion for Orientalism. Her designs were both influenced by Russian tradition and the Byzantine mosaics, which are visible in both the costumes and the dresses. Her work also exhibits Primitivist tendencies.

She also designed many costumes for the Ballets Russes, most notably for the company's production of The Golden Cockerel (Le Coq d'Or) and The Firebird. She was a key member of the Ballets Russes and worked closely with Sergei Diaghilev and Bronislava Nijinska. Her work had a major influence on French fashion at the time, particularly with legendary designer Paul Poiret.

== Exhibitions and collections ==
In 1961 the Arts Council of Great Britain held a major retrospective of Goncharova's and Larionov's work. The Tate Modern in London held a Retrospective in 2019. In 2019 an exhibition on Goncharova was held at the Palazzo Strozzi in Florence. In 2020: The co-operated exhibition of Tate Modern, Palazzo Strozzi and Ateneum moved to Helsinki, Finland (27 February until 17 May)

Goncharova's work was included in the 2021 exhibition Women in Abstraction at the Centre Pompidou.

Her work is in the collection of The Guggenheim, the Israel Museum, the McNay Art Museum, the Museum of Modern Art, The Museum of New Zealand Te Papa Tongarewa and the Tate

=== Art market ===
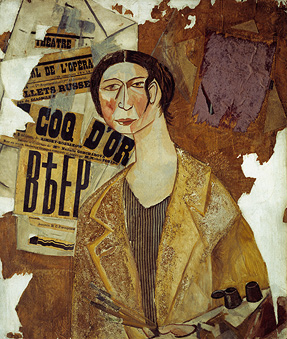
Portrait of Natalia Goncharova by Mikhail Larionov (1915)

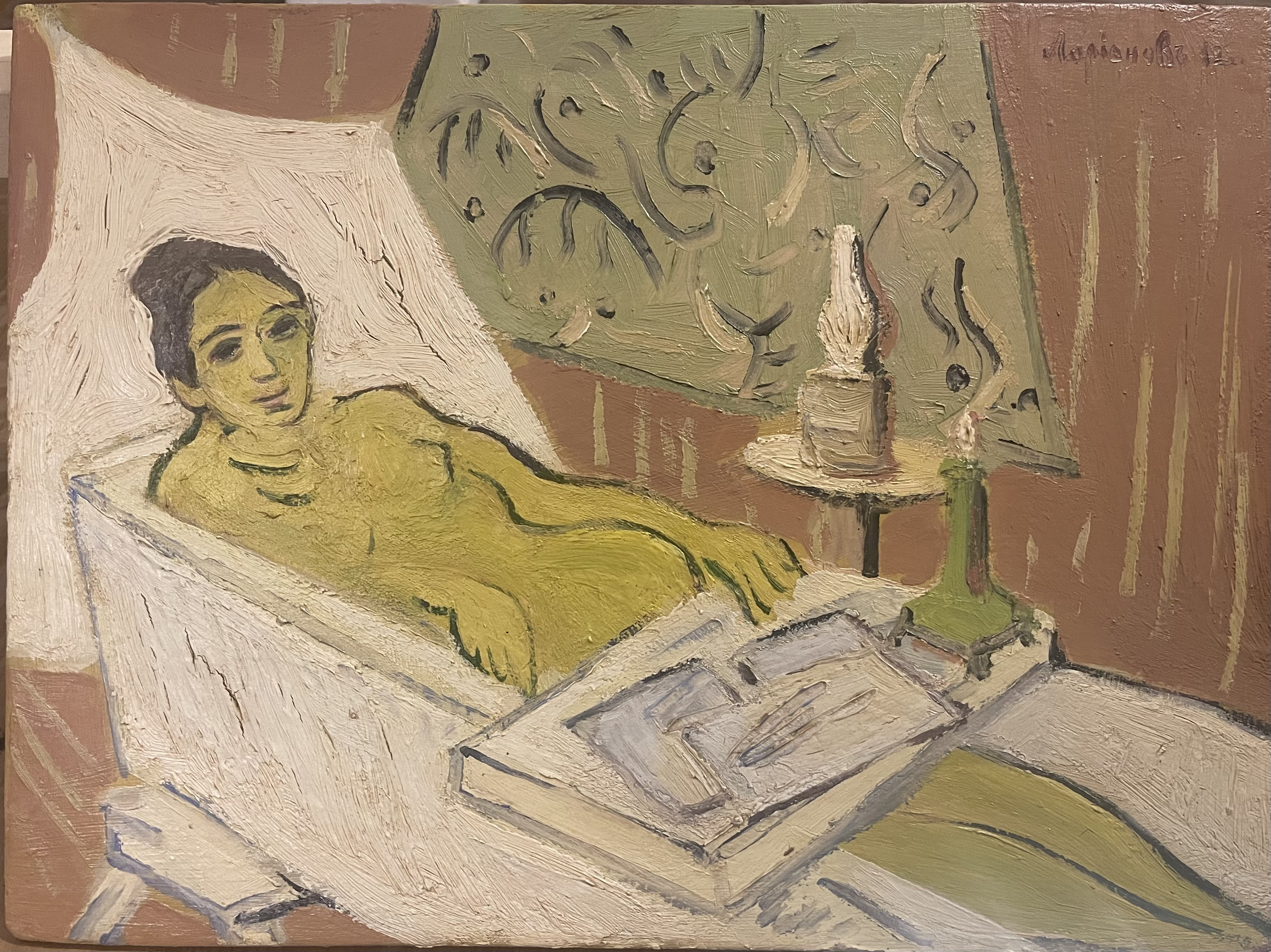
’’Study of the woman - Portrait of Natalia Goncharova)’’ by Mikhail Larionov (1912)

On 18 June 2007, Goncharova's 1909 painting Picking Apples was auctioned at Christie's for $9.8 million, setting a record for any female artist at the time. She is considered one of the most expensive women artists at auction, and her work features in Russian art auctions during the bi-annual Russian Art Week in London.

In November 2007, Bluebells (1909) brought £3.1 million ($6.2 million). In 2008, Goncharova's 1912 still-life The Flowers (formerly part of Guillaume Apollinaire's collection) sold for $10.8 million.

=== Rediscovery of two works ===
In 2019, a scholar researching the life of the Czech Futurist painter Růžena Zátková found two previously unknown gouaches by Goncharova in a private collection; both the works were dedicated to Zatkova, and were from 1916. The two artists had been friends since 1915, since Sergei Diaghilev had invited them, Mikhail Larionov, and Diaghilev's troupe, the Ballets Russes, to stay with him in his rented Swiss villa, and the works were made whilst Zatkova was ill with tuberculosis.

=== Tributes ===
On 3 July 2017, Google celebrated her 136th birthday with a Google Doodle.

== Filmography ==
- Drama in the Futurists' Cabaret No. 13 (partially lost)

== Gallery ==
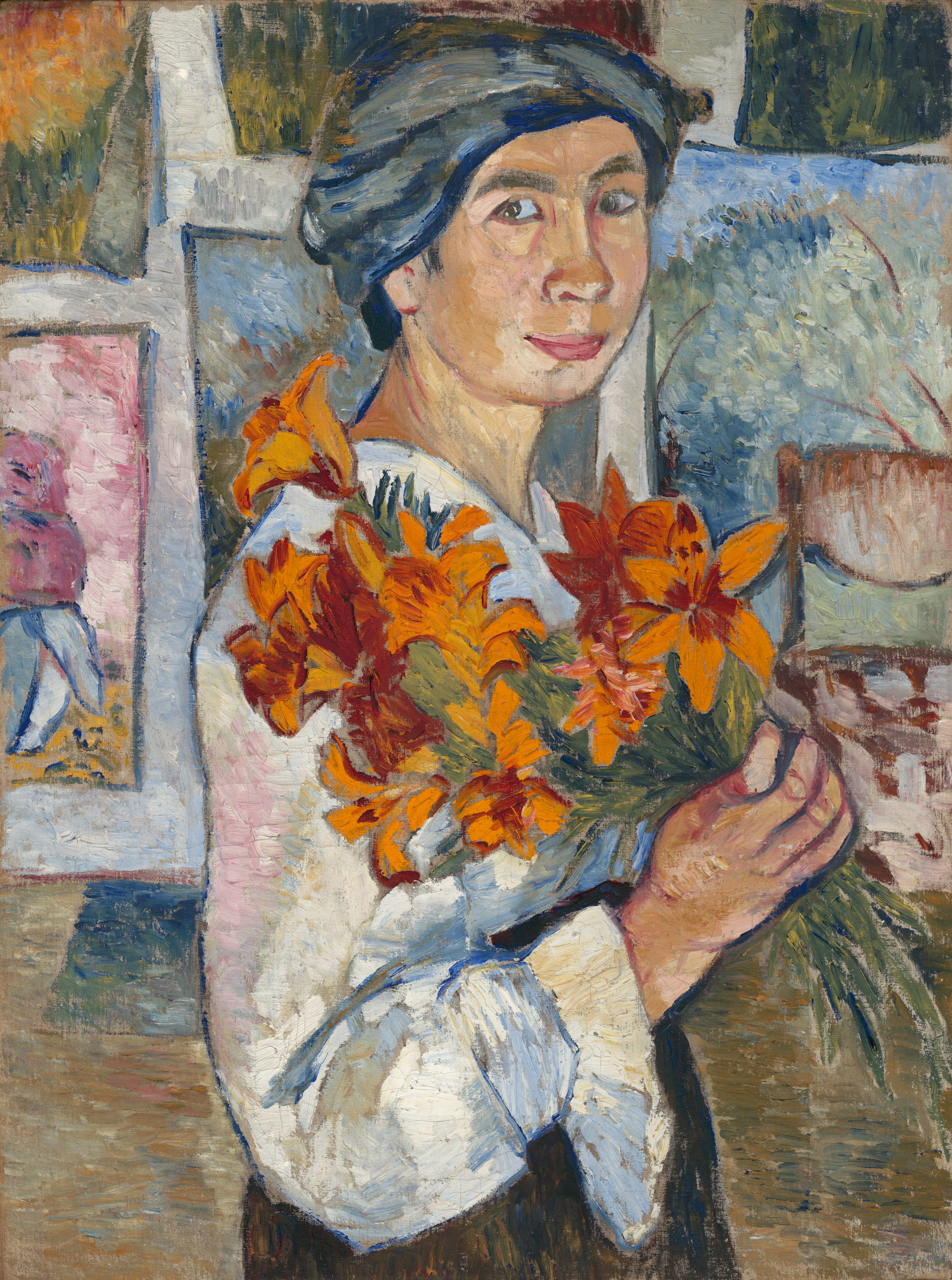
Self-portrait (1907)

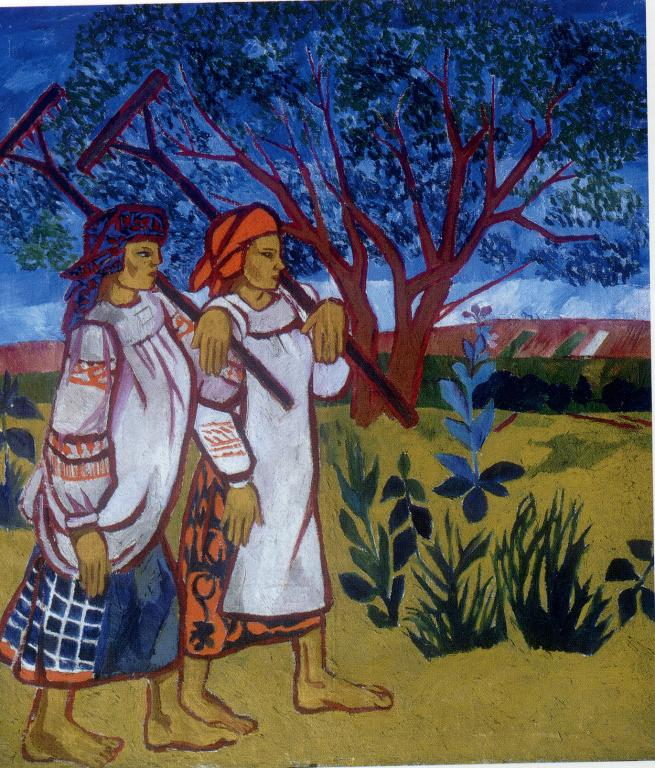
Women with rakes (1907)

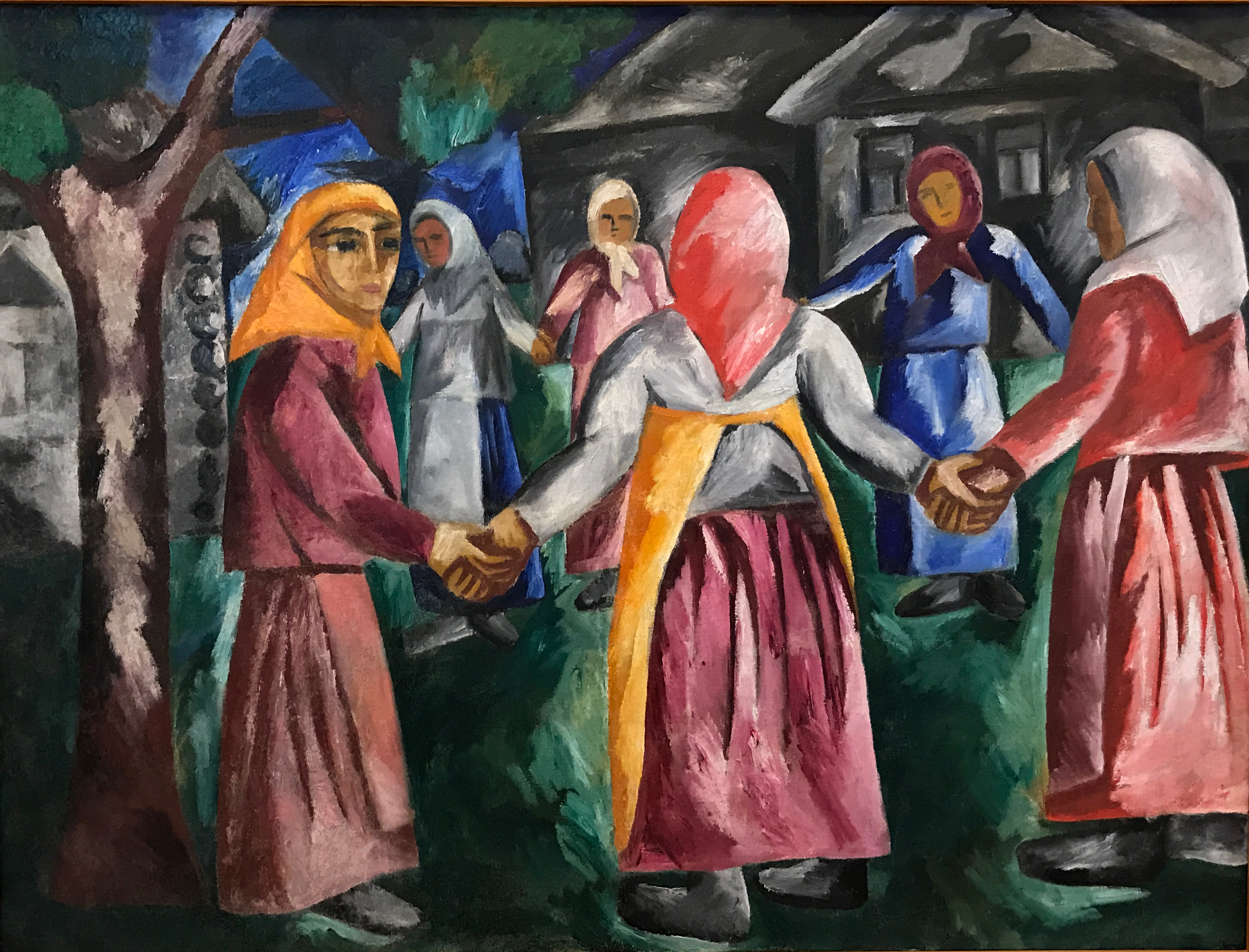
Khorovod (1910)

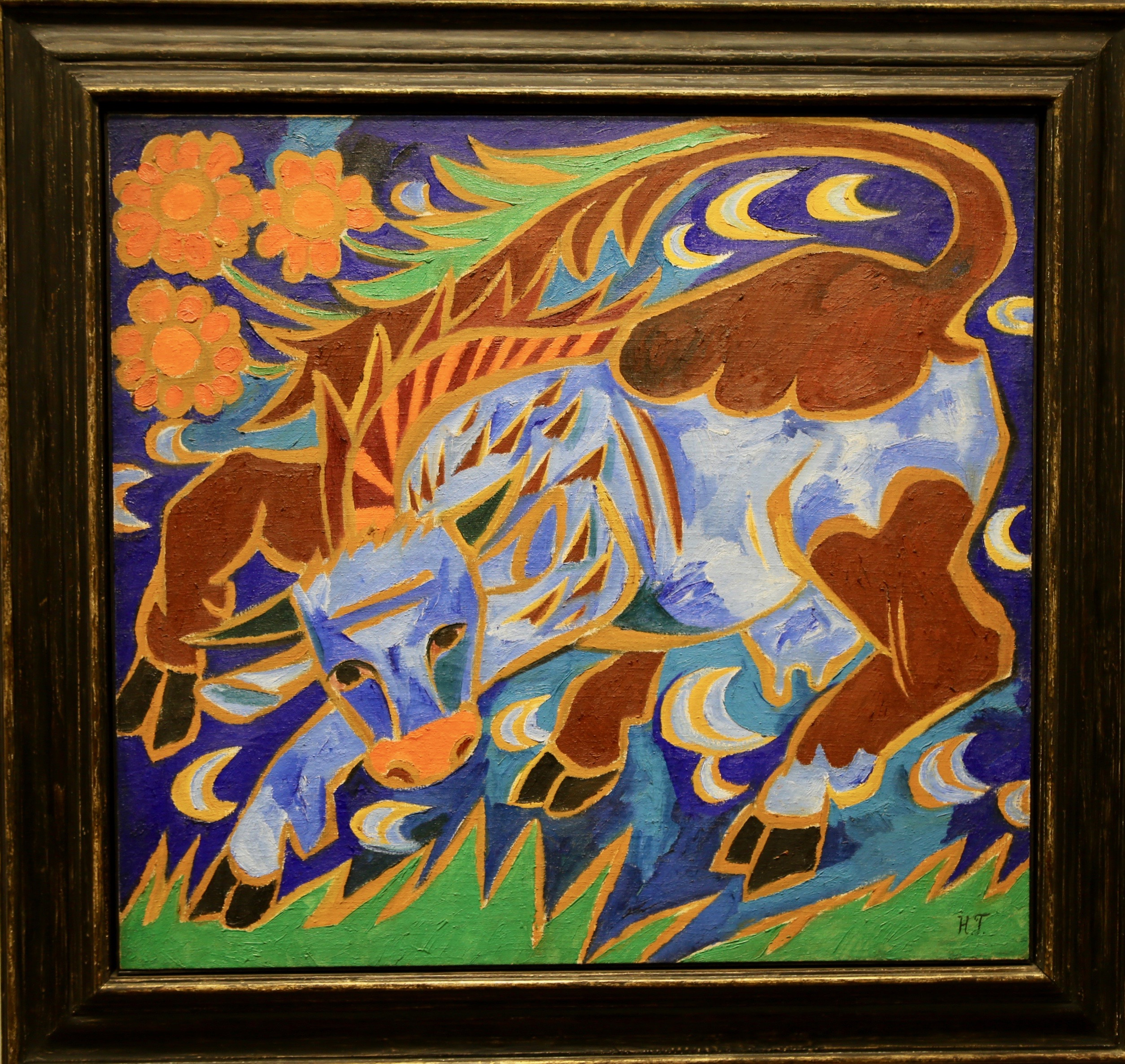
Blue Cow (1911)

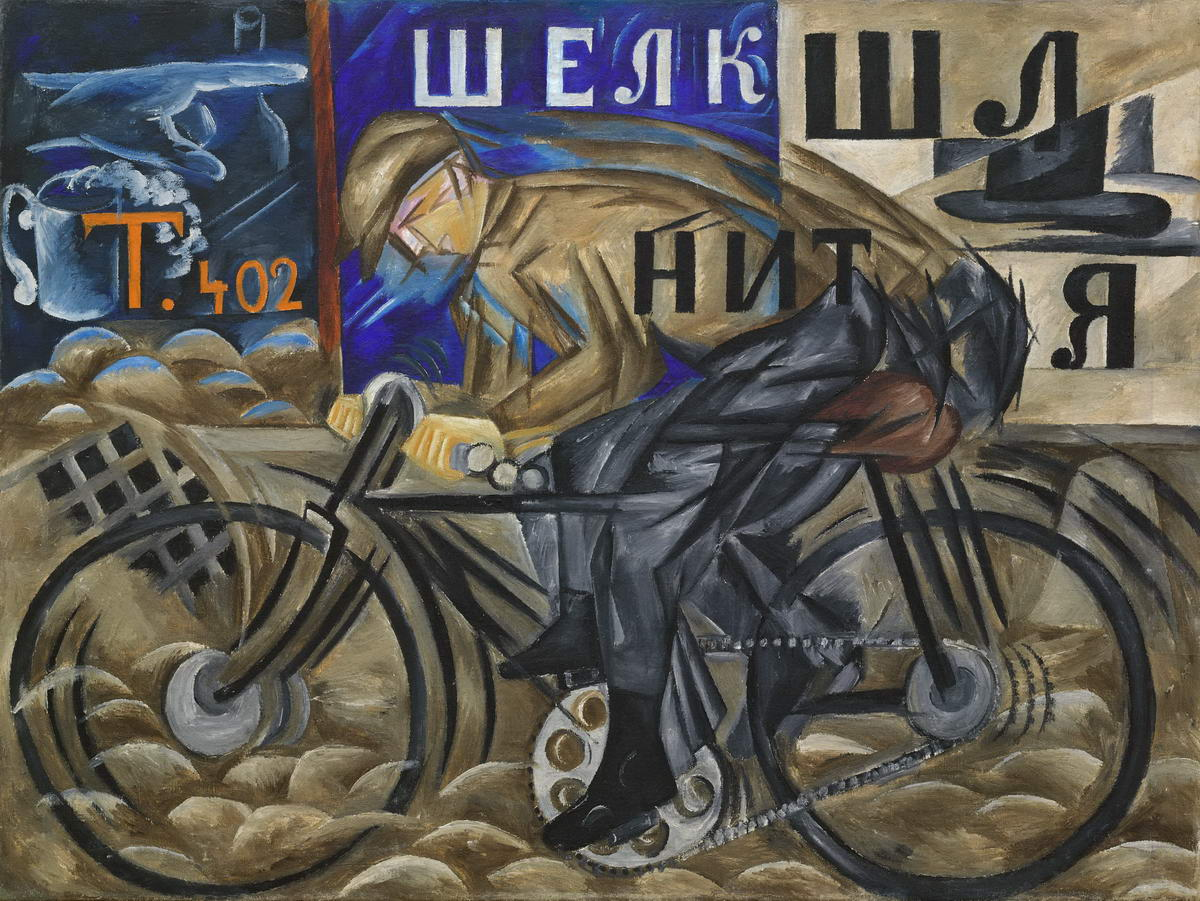
Cyclist (1913)

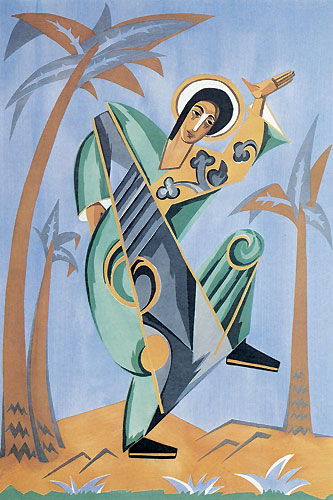
Costume design for St John (1915)
