= Georges Lesueur =

French railway engineer, public works contractor and politician

Joseph Georges Lesueur
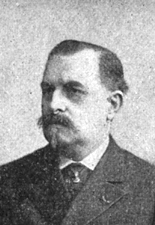

Senator of Algeria (Constantine)
- In office 5 January 1888 – 2 January 1897
- Preceded by: Dominique Forcioli
- Succeeded by: Alcide Treille

Personal details
- Born: 15 April 1834 Bordeaux, Gironde, France
- Died: 13 January 1910 (aged 75) Paris, France
- Occupation: Railway engineer, politician

Joseph Georges Lesueur (French pronunciation: [ʒozɛf ʒɔʁʒ ləsɥœʁ]; 15 April 1834 – 13 January 1910) was a French railway engineer, public works contractor and politician who was Senator of Algeria from 1888 to 1897.

== Early years ==
Georges Lesueur was born on 15 April 1834 in Bordeaux, Gironde. He attended the École Polytechnique, and was engineer for various railway companies including the networks of the East of France, the North of Spain, the Trans-Siberian and the Trans-Saharan. Around 1860 he married Marie Martin. Their children were Andrée, Roger and Germaine Lesueur.

== Public works contractor ==
As a public works contractor, Lesueur directed construction of the port of Philippeville, which had been considered impossible, the port of Bône, the Bougie ferry terminal, bridges over the Soummam and Seybouse rivers, and the port of Bizerte. During the Franco-Prussian War of 1870, he formed his workers into armed companies to replace the regular troops who had been sent to metropolitan France. Although the government told him to suspend all public works, he continued them using his own money to avoid laying off workers. Lesueur became President of the Superior Council of the Constantine department, and Vice-President of the Superior Council of Algeria. He was a Knight of the Legion of Honour.

== Senator ==
Lesueur was elected to the Senate on 5 January 1888 in the first round, winning 94 votes against 89 for the incumbent senator Dominique Forcioli. On 10 March 1888 there was a lengthy debate in the Senate on his election. Alfred Joseph Naquet disputed the validity of the ballot and pointed out irregularities such as visits by the Prefect of Constantine with Lesueur to several communes in the department and subsidies given to some communes on the eve of the election. However, the Senate ruled by 146 votes to 110 that the election was valid.

In the Senate, Lesueur sat on the left and belong to the Republican Union group. He was a member of a number of committees, and was particularly concerned with defending Algerian interests. He abstained from voting on the military law. He voted for reestablishment of the district poll (13 February 1889), for the draft Lisbonne law restricting freedom of the press and for the process to be followed in the Senate against General Boulanger. Lesueur was member of the Customs Committee; the Railway Committee, of which he became Secretary in 1894, and the Finance Committee. He was rapporteur for many motions related to foreign trade, railways and shipping. He was secretary of the committee for improvements to the port of Saint-Nazaire, and secretary of the senatorial group of maritime interests.

In 1893 Lesueur asked the government to reserve some types of industrial and agricultural activity to Algeria to reduce unemployment. He wanted to make Algeria the granary of France, and to make the Filfla marble quarries the rivals of Carrara. He served as administrator delegate to the Paris Stock Exchange and president of the jury of the Antwerp exhibition. The Société africaine de France (French African Society) was founded in 1888 as a learned society, but soon ran into difficulties. It was restored under the chairmanship of Lesueur in 1895 as a vehicle for propaganda of the colonial party, linked to groups such as the Syndicat français du bassin du Tchad (French Syndicate of the Chad Basin).

Lesueur did not run for reelection in 1897. He died in Paris on 13 January 1910 at the age of 75.

== Publications ==
Publications include:

- Lesueur, Georges (1894), La Locomotive électrique, système J.-J. Heilmann (in French), Publications du journal le Génie civil

== Sources ==
- Andrew, C. M.; Grupp, Peter; Kanya-Forstner, A. Sydney (1975), "Le mouvement colonial français et ses principales personnalités (1890-1914)", Revue française d'histoire d'outre-mer (in French), 62 (229), doi:10.3406/outre
- Bertrand, Alphonse (1894), "LESUEUR (Joseph-Georges)", Le Sénat de 1894: biographies des 300 sénateurs (in French), chez P. Mouillot
- Imhaus, Bernard, "Georges LESUEUR", Geneanet
- Jolly, Jean, ed. (1960), "LESUEUR (JOSEPH, Georges)", Dictionnaire des parlementaires français de 1889 à 1940, Presses universitaires de France
- Robert, Adolphe; Cougny, Gaston (1889–1891), "LESUEUR (JOSEPH-GEORGES)", in Edgar Bourloton (ed.), Dictionnaire des Parlementaires français (1789–1889) (in French)
