= Marie Cuttoli =

French businesswoman

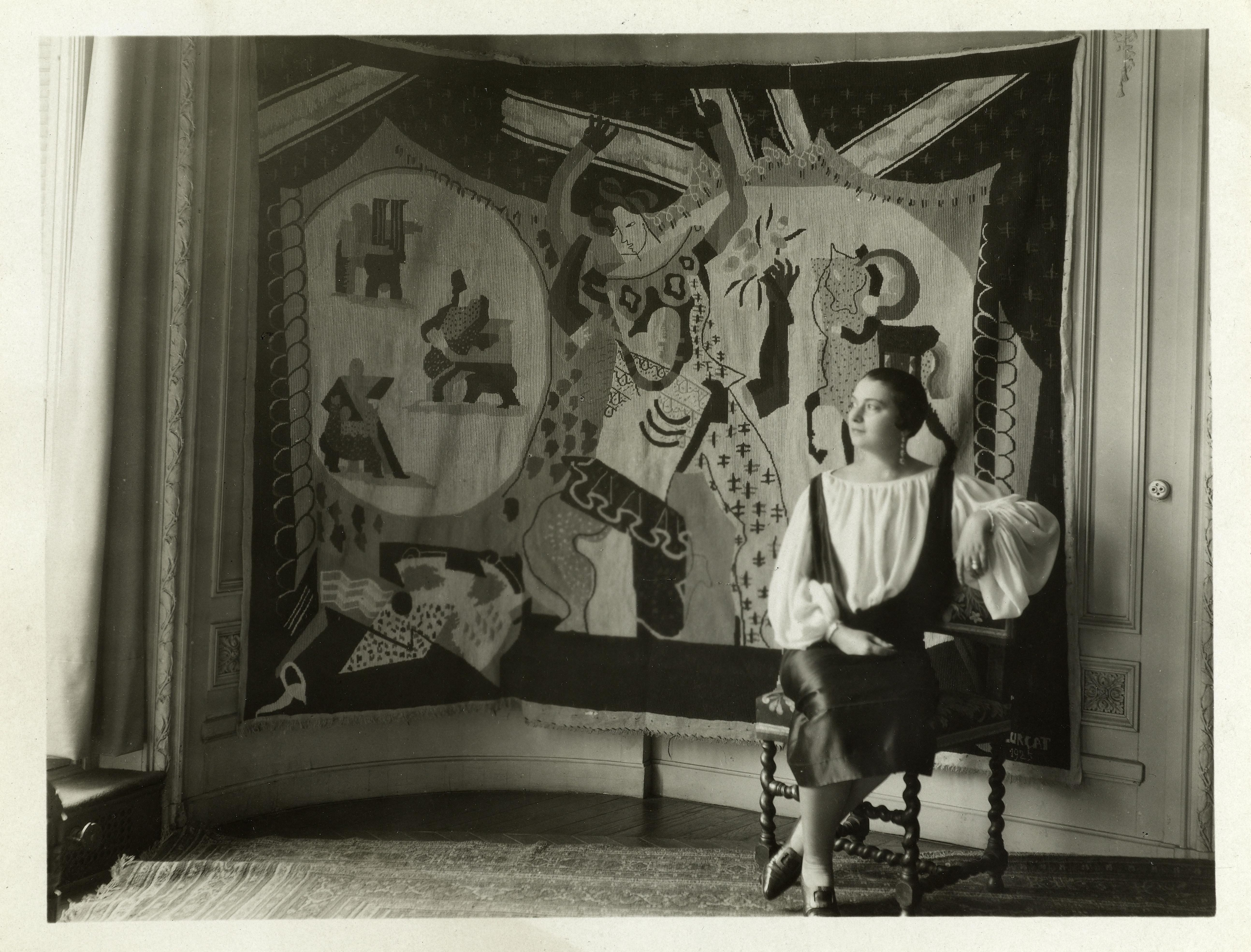
- Born: 1879; Tulle, France
- Died: 1973 (aged 93–94)
- Known for: Tapestry commissioning
- Spouse: Paul Cuttoli

Marie Cuttoli (born Myriam Bordes; 1879 – 1973) was a French entrepreneur, born in Tulle, and patron of modernist tapestry.

== Career ==
Cuttoli's original interests were in reviving carpet production in Algeria. Around 1910, she set up a workshop in her Algerian home to teach the trade to local women; their works were then sold to haute couture houses in Paris. In July 1922, Cuttoli opened a fashion house and boutique, Myrbor (a portmanteau of the first three letters of Myriam, the Algerian variant of Marie, and the first three letters of her maiden name, Bordes) at 17 rue Vignon in Paris. She collaborated with Jean Lurçat for the interior design of the boutique. The street Myrbor was located on included established art dealers, such as Daniel-Henry Kahnweiler. Maison Myrbor produced embroidered and appliqué dresses, some designed by Natalia Goncharova, offered a decoration department, and held major painting exhibitions for artists such as Salvador Dalí and Francis Cyril Rose. A Myrbor gown was featured in US Vogue in October 1922. In 1925, her works were displayed and well received at the International Exposition of Modern Industrial and Decorative Arts.

The Barnes Foundation exhibited her work in 2020, and published a catalog of this work, citing the exhibition as the first celebration of "her visionary approach to art and business" by a major American institution.

Cuttoli commissioned tapestry cartoons from Georges Braque, Fernand Léger, Joan Miró, and Pablo Picasso in 1927. The following year, she turned her attention to reviving the Aubusson tapestry industry. She encouraged additional avant-garde artists of the time to weave tapestries based upon their easel paintings. These included André Bauchant, Raoul Dufy, Le Corbusier, Lurçat, Henri Matisse, and Rouault. Cuttoli went on to partner with Galerie Jeanne Bucher, and later with Galerie Lucie Weill & Seligmann.

== Personal life ==
In 1912, she married Paul Cuttoli, an Algerian-born French politician, a Radical Socialist senator. The Cuttolis built a mansion in Philippeville, Algeria named Villa Myriam. Her Parisian home at 55 Rue de Babylone went on to become the home of Yves Saint Laurent and his partner, Pierre Bergé. A close friend of Picasso and other contemporary artists, the Cuttolis collected works by Picasso, as well Braque, Alexander Calder, Dufy, and Léger. Her collection of Cubist works was donated to the Musée National d'Art Moderne, the 1969 Cuttoli-Laugier donation to the same museum included a collection of Picassos.
