= Rémy Jacques =

French lawyer and politician

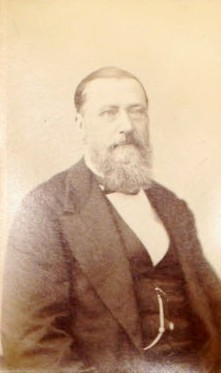

Representative of Algeria
- In office 9 July 1871 – 12 August 1871

Representative of Algeria
- In office 7 January 1872 – 7 March 1876

Deputy of Algeria
- In office 20 February 1876 – 26 January 1882

Senator of Algeria
- In office 8 January 1882 – 27 January 1900
- Preceded by: Auguste Pomel
- Succeeded by: Marcel Saint-Germain

Personal details
- Born: 1 January 1817 Breteuil, Oise, France
- Died: 15 September 1905 (aged 88) Oran, French Algeria
- Occupation: Lawyer, politician

Rémy Jacques (1 January 1817 – 15 September 1905) was a French lawyer and politician. He represented the department of Oran, French Algeria, in the National Assembly and then the Chamber of Deputies from 1871 to 1882. He was then Senator of Oran from 1882 to 1900.

== Life ==
Rémy Jacques was born on 1 January 1817 in Breteuil, Oise. After completing his law studies he enrolled as an advocate in Oran.

=== National Assembly (1871–76) ===
Jacques ran for election as Representative of the Oran department in the National Assembly on 17 February 1871, but won only 2,175 votes out of 10,167. After Joseph Andrieu resigned and Léon Gambetta chose to represent another department there were two vacancies in the Assembly for Oran. Jacques ran again on 12 July 1871 and was elected in second place by 2,288 votes out of 7,193. This election was annulled due to irregularities in the vote counting process.

Jacques ran for election again on 7 January 1872, this time successfully. He sat with the Republican Union group, Union républicaine. He voted for return of the Assembly to Paris, against the resignation of Adolphe Thiers on 24 May, against the septennat, against the state of siege, against the law of mayors, against the Ministry of Albert de Broglie, for the Wallon and Pascal Duprat amendments and for the entire Constitutional law. He held office until 7 March 1876.

=== Deputy (1876–82) ===
Jacques was invited to run for the Senate in 1876, but chose to run for the Chamber of Deputies on 20 February 1876, and was elected to represent Oran by 5,638 votes out of 6,245. He sat with the left, and was a member of the budget committee. He opposed the government after the 16 May 1877 crisis, and voted with the 363 deputies against the government. He was reelected without opposition on 14 October 1877, and joined the Opportunist Republicans majority. He voted for invalidation of Louis Auguste Blanqui's election, for Article 7 of the Higher Education Act, for the new press laws and for the right of assembly.

On 30 June 1881 Jacques attacked the acting Governor-General of Algeria, Albert Grévy, for having caused the insurrection in Sud-Oran through his negligence. He said "it is necessary to rid Algeria of a man who has forever lost her trust". Jacques was reelected on 21 August 1881, holding office until 26 January 1882. He supported the Gambetta ministry in the Chamber before leaving for the Senate.

=== Senator (1882–1900) ===
Jacques was elected Senator of Algeria on 8 January 1882. As Senator he participated in debates over Algeria. He voted for reform of judicial staff, for credits for the Tonkin Campaign, for divorce, for expulsion of the princes, for the new military law, for reinstatement of the district poll (13 February 1889), for the draft Lisbonne law restricting freedom of the press and for the procedure to be followed in the Senate against General Boulanger. He was reelected on 4 January 1891 with 233 votes out of 235 due to the decisive support of Eugène Étienne. He now devoted all his energy to defense of colonization in Algeria.

On 6 March 1891 he intervened in a discussion over antagonism between colonists and indigenous people and stated his regret that France had not brought more vinemakers to Algeria after the southern French vineyards had been ruined by phylloxera. After this debate a committee was set up which issued a lengthy report debated on 29 May 1893. Jacques intervened again to ask that useful proposals from the report be brought together in an organic law, which would end the administrative instability in Algeria. On 2 September 1891 Jacques joined the senators for Algiers and Constantine in asking for credits to fight locust invasions in Algeria. In 1894 Jacques intervened in the discussion on reforming the land ownership law in Algeria, in 1895 he called for improved postal service between metropolitan France and North Africa, in 1897 he spoke on the Algerian budget an in 1899 obtained renewal of credits for creation of schools in Algeria. He held office until 27 January 1900.

Jacques ran for reelection in 1900 but failed. He died on 15 September 1905 in Oran, Algeria.

== Publications ==
Rémy Jacques published many legislative proposals and reports. A selection:

=== Chamber of Deputies ===
- Rémy Jacques (1877), Rapport fait au nom de la Commission du Budget sur le budget des dépenses de l'Exercice 1878, (Ministère de l'Intérieur). Service du gouvernement général civil de l'Algérie (2e législature, session 1877, n ° 183), Versailles: Impr. de Cerf et fils, p. 127
- Rémy Jacques (1877), Rapport fait au nom de la Commission du Budget sur le Budget des dépenses de l'exercice 1878, (Gouvernement général civil de l'Algérie) (1re législature session 1877, n ° 971), Versailles: Impr. de Cerf et fils, p. 120
- Gastu; Rémy Jacques (1878), Proposition de loi ayant pour objet de régulariser le régime des terres domaniales en Algérie en ce qui concerne la colonisation (2e législature, session 1878, n ° 917), Versailles: Impr. de Cerf et fils, p. 22
- Rémy Jacques (1879), Rapport fait au nom de la Commission chargée d'examiner : 1 ° le projet de loi relatif à l'exécution de la loi du 26 juillet 1873 sur la constitution de la propriété indigène en Algérie... 2 ° la proposition de loi de MM. Jacques, Gastu, Thomson, relative à l'exécution de la loi du 26 juillet 1873, sur la constitution de la propriété indigène en Algérie (2e législature, session 1879, n ° 1462), Versailles: Impr. de Cerf et fils, p. 35
- Rémy Jacques (1879), Rapport fait au nom de la Commission chargée d'examiner le projet de loi concernant l'exploitation des lignes maritimes postales entre la France et l'Algérie (2e législature, session 1879, n ° 1717), Versailles: Impr. de Cerf et fils, p. 19
- Rémy Jacques (1881), Rapport fait au nom de la commission chargée d'examiner le projet de loi sur l'état civil des indigènes musulmans de l'Algérie (2e législature, session de 1881. N ° 3326), Paris: Impr. de A. Quantin, p. 40

=== Senate ===
- Rémy Jacques (1883), Rapport fait, au nom de la Commission chargée d'examiner le projet de loi portant organisation de la juridiction française en Tunisie (Session 1883. N ° 45), Paris: Impr. de P. Mouillot, p. 26
- Rémy Jacques (1889), Rapport supplémentaire fait, au nom de la Commission chargée d'examiner : 1 ° la proposition de loi de M. le Cte d'Haussonville relative au mode d'aliénation des terres domaniales de colonisation en Algérie ; 2 ° le projet de loi ayant pour but d'assurer le développement de la colonisation en Algérie à l'aide de ressources domaniales (Session 1889. N ° 253), Paris: Impr. de P. Mouillot, p. 38
- Rémy Jacques (1891), La question algérienne devant le Sénat (séance du 6 mars 1891, discours), Bordeaux: impr. de J. Péchade, p. 54

== Sources ==
- Jolly, Jean, ed. (1960), "JACQUES (RÉMY)", Dictionnaire des parlementaires français de 1889 à 1940, Presses universitaires de France
- Rémy Jacques (in French), Assemblée nationale
- Rémy Jacques (1817-19..) (in French), BnF: Bibliotheque nationale de France
- Robert, Adolphe; Cougny, Gaston (1889–1891), "JACQUES (REMY)", in Edgar Bourloton (ed.), Dictionnaire des Parlementaires français (1789–1889) (in French)
- Robert, Adolphe; Cougny, Gaston (1889–1891b), "GRÉVY (JULES-PHILIPPE-LOUIS-ALBERT)", in Edgar Bourloton (ed.), Dictionnaire des Parlementaires français (1789–1889) (in French)
