= Paul Cuttoli =

French politician

Chamber of Deputies
- In office 1920–1940

Constituent Assembly of 1945

Personal details
- Born: 28 June 1864
- Died: 27 April 1949 (aged 84)
- Party: Radical
- Spouse: Marie Cuttoli

Paul Cuttoli (28 June 1864 - 27 April 1949) was a French politician.

Cuttoli was born in Bologhine, Algeria (then known as Saint-Eugène). He was a Member of the Chamber of Deputies from 1906 to 1919, a Senator from 1920 to 1940 and a Member of the Constituent Assembly elected in 1945. He belonged to the Radical Party.
