= Paul Saurin =

French politician (1903–1983)

Paul Saurin (6 October 1903 – 15 May 1983) was a French politician.

Saurin was born in Hassi Mamèche, Algeria (then called Rivoli). He represented the Independent Radicals in the Chamber of Deputies from 1934 to 1940. On 10 July 1940, he voted in favour of granting the cabinet presided by Marshal Philippe Pétain authority to draw up a new constitution, thereby effectively ending the French Third Republic and establishing Vichy France.
