= Pierre Roux-Freissineng =

French politician

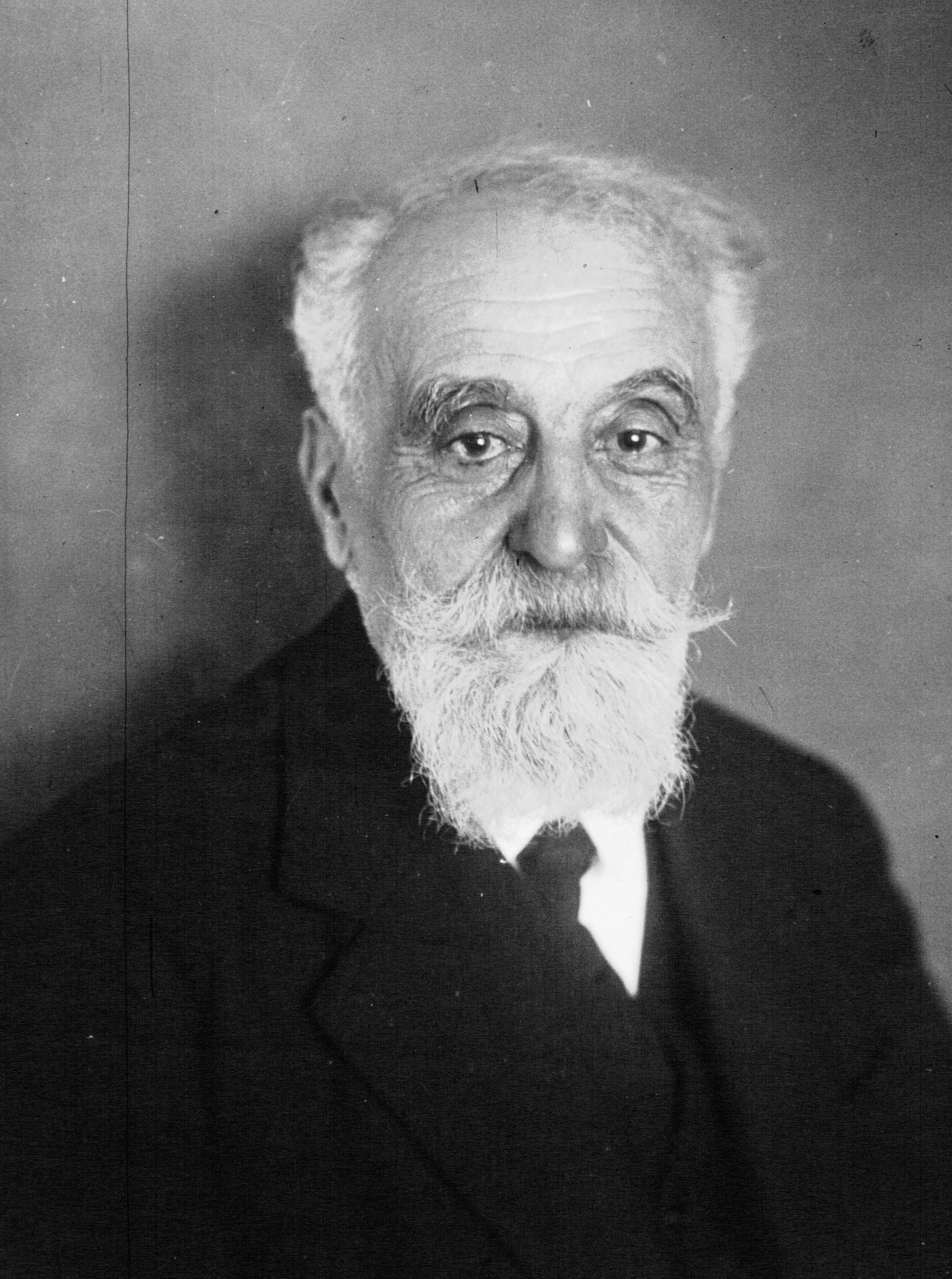
Pierre Roux-Freissineng 1932

Pierre Roux-Freissineng (27 May 1863 - 20 December 1952) was a French politician.

He was born in Marseille, and represented the Independent Radicals in the Chamber of Deputies from 1919 to 1933 and as a Senator from 1934 to 1940.
