= Ferdinand Lelièvre =

Senator of Algeria (Algiers)
- In office 30 January 1876. – 24 January 1885
- Succeeded by: Alexandre Mauguin

Personal details
- Born: 7 November 1799 Trier, France
- Died: 24 January 1885 (aged 85) Algiers, Algeria
- Occupation: Landowner and politician

Ferdinand Lelièvre (7 November 1799 – 24 January 1885) was a French lawyer and colonial landowner who became Senator of the Algiers department of Algeria from 1876 to 1885. He was an active supporter of the French Second Republic of 1848–51, and an opponent of the Second French Empire that followed. This led to his deportation to Algeria in 1858, where he became influential in opposition politics. After the fall of the empire, he was elected Senator of Algeria on a Republican platform.

== Early years (1799–1851) ==
Ferdinand Lelièvre was born on 7 November 1799 in Trèves (Trier), then part of France. (Note: Trier was annexed by France in 1794-95 during the French Revolutionary Wars and made the capital of department of the Sarre. It was transferred to the Kingdom of Prussia after the Napoleonic Wars ended in 1815.) His parents were François Guillaume Emmanuel Lelièvre and Catherine Ladoucette. His family originated in Lorraine. He studied law, received a license, and then became a clerk of the Justice of the Peace of Nancy. His first wife, Anne Antoinette Henriette Lefevre, died in 1835. After the February Revolution of 1848 Lelièvre declared himself colonel of the National Guard of Nancy in 1848 and became the main editor of the Republican journal Le Travail.

== Second Empire (1851–70) ==
After the 2 December 1851 coup d'état Le Travail was suppressed and Lelièvre was expelled from France. He was pardoned in 1853 and returned to Nancy. The general security law of 27 February 1858 followed the attack by Felice Orsini on 14 January 1858 on the opera in which 12 people died. The law allowed deportation without trial of those considered dangerous by joint commissions. Lelièvre was transported by an order of 16 March 1858 which said nothing of the alleged facts. (Note: Another source says Lelièvre was charged with having supported the electoral candidacy of General Louis-Eugène Cavaignac in 1857, and having distributed his professions of faith.) He was assigned to live in Ténès, Algeria under the law of general safety, and shipped in the convoy of March 1858. He was held in irons during his journey from Algiers to Ténès.

After the amnesty Lelièvre moved to Algiers, where he had bought some properties. He found the climate of Algiers healthy and decided to stay there to cure his rheumatism. A letter from him dated 14 September 1858 to the prefect of Meurthe asked for his son and his faithful governess to be allowed to join him, using cheap tickets from Nancy to Marseille. He explained that his son would continue his studies at the newly opened medical school in Algiers, and would submit his thesis in Montpellier. Lelièvre became a landowner in the country and acquired considerable political influence. He was an elected a municipal councilor in Algiers, then a general councilor in the department. He remained hostile to the imperial regime and contributed to several independent newspapers. He actively campaigned against the plebiscite of 8 May 1870.

== Third Republic (1870–86) ==
After the fall of the empire Lelièvre was a member of the Republican Committee of Algiers, as were Georges Tillier and Romuald Vuillermoz, who had also been deported in 1858. They aimed to impose revolutionary action on the new prefect, Warnier. After the decree making indigenous Algerian Jews citizens of France, Lelièvre tried to stem the resulting wave of antisemitism.

Lelièvre ran successfully for election to the senate as a Republican candidate on 30 January 1876. He was elected by 50 votes out of 90. He sat with the Republican Union group. He spoke in the senate several times in debates of establishing a civil regime in Algeria and treating Algerian departments as French departments. He opposed the de Broglie government after the 16 May 1877 crisis and voted against the dissolution of the chamber of deputies in June 1877. He voted for the Jules Ferry laws on education, for new press laws, for the right of assembly, for the various ministries that held power, for reform of the personnel of the judiciary and for the restoration of divorce.

On 7 February 1882 Lelièvre, then aged 84, was granted a pension of 800 francs under a law giving assistance to victims of the 2 December 1851 coup. Lelièvre left office on 24 January 1885. In the triennial senate renewal of 25 January 1885 he won only 105 votes against 130 to his opponent, Alexandre Mauguin. On 19 May 1885 he married Marie Thérèse Gadchaux (1812–1896) in Algiers. He tried for election on the Radical list to the Chamber of Deputies in the next general election but failed, with only 2,699 votes out of 11,810 voters. Ferdinand Lelièvre died on 27 December 1886 in Algiers, Algeria.

== Sources ==
- Hourihane, Colum (2012-12-06), The Grove Encyclopedia of Medieval Art and Architecture, OUP USA, ISBN 978-0-19-539536-5
- LELIEVRE Ferdinand (in French), Senate of France
- Pilliard, Jean, "Ferdinand LELIEVRE", Geneanet (in French)
- Robert, Adolphe; Cougny, Gaston (1889–1891), "LELIÈVRE (FERDINAND)", in Edgar Bourloton (ed.), Dictionnaire des Parlementaires français (1789–1889) (in French)
- Sers (February 1950), "Recherches sur l'activité des transportés en Algérie" (PDF), 1848. Revue des révolutions contemporaines (in French), 42 (185): 47–75, doi:10.3406/r1848.1950.1469
- Thiébault, Edmond (8 January 2010), "De singulières "juridictions" : les commissions mixtes de 1852 et notamment la commission mixte du département de la Meurthe" (PDF), Mémoires de l'Académie de Stanislas (in French), XXIV, Académie de Stanislas
- Vimont, Jean-Claude (19 March 2013), "Les déportés républicains de 1858", Justice et détention politique, Bagnes, prisons et quartiers politiques (in French), Criminocorpus
