= Draâ El Mizan District =

Coordinates: 36°32′08″N 3°50′03″E

- District
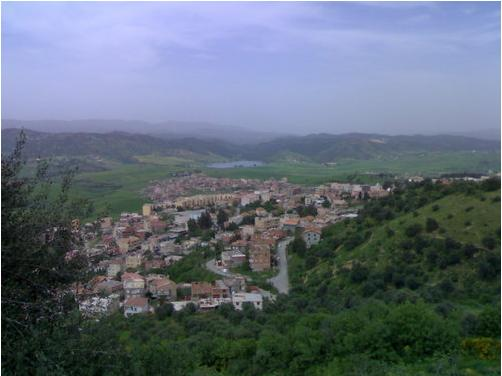

- Country: Algeria
- Province: Tizi Ouzou Province
- Time zone: UTC+1 (CET)

Draâ El Mizan District is a district of Tizi Ouzou Province, Algeria.

The district is further divided into 4 municipalities:

- Aïn Zaouia
- Aït Yahia Moussa
- Draâ El Mizan
- Frikat

== Localities ==
- Boufhaima
