= René Enjalbert =

French politician (1890–1976)

René Enjalbert (8 September 1890 - 29 December 1976) was a French politician.

Enjalbert was born in Aïn Témouchent. He represented the Independent Radicals in the Chamber of Deputies from 1936 to 1940. From 1951 to 1962 he belonged to the Senate.
