= Limousis =

Commune in Occitanie, France

- Commune
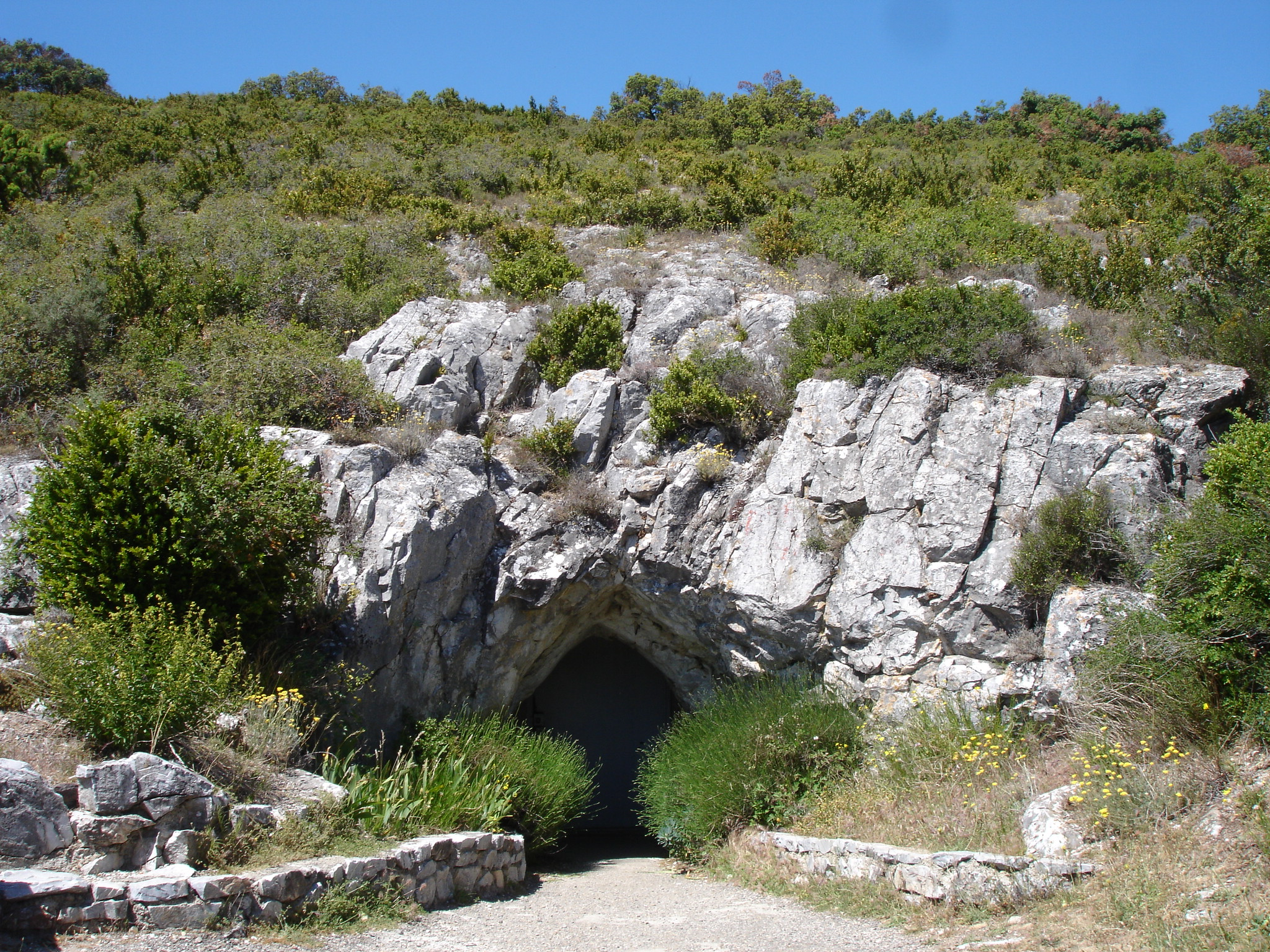
- Cave

- Coat of arms
- Location of Limousis
- Location within France Location within Occitanie
- Coordinates: 43°20′05″N 2°24′07″E
- Country: France
- Region: Occitania
- Department: Aude
- Arrondissement: Carcassonne
- Canton: Le Haut-Minervois
- Intercommunality: Carcassonne Agglo

Government
  - Mayor (2020–2026): Gilles Delaur
- Area^{1}: 9.92 km^{2} (3.83 sq mi)
- Elevation: 368 m (1,207 ft)
- Highest elevation: 580 m (1,900 ft)
- Lowest elevation: 144 m (472 ft)
- Population (2023): 121
  - Density: 12.2/km^{2} (31.6/sq mi)
- Time zone: UTC+01:00 (CET)
  - Summer (DST): UTC+02:00 (CEST)
- INSEE/Postal code: 11205 /11600
- ^{1} French Land Register data, which excludes lakes, ponds, glaciers > 1 km^{2} (0.386 sq mi or 247 acres) and river estuaries.

Limousis is a commune in the Aude department in southern France.

== Population ==
Historical population
Year	Pop.	±% p.a.
1968	158	—
1975	110	−5.04%
1982	91	−2.67%
1990	86	−0.70%
1999	104	+2.13%
2007	105	+0.12%
2012	110	+0.93%
2017	129	+3.24%
2023	121	−1.06%
Source: INSEE

== See also ==
- Communes of the Aude department
