= Alexandre Mauguin =

French politician

Deputy of Algeria
- In office 21 August 1881 – 5 February 1885

Senator of Algeria
- In office 25 January 1885 – 6 January 1894
- Preceded by: Ferdinand Lelièvre
- Succeeded by: Paul Gerente

Personal details
- Born: 30 January 1838 Allerey, Côte-d'Or, France
- Died: 4 March 1916 (aged 78) Algiers, French Algeria
- Occupation: Printer, politician

Alexandre Mauguin (30 January 1838 – 4 March 1916) was a French printer who was deputy and then senator of the department of Algiers in French Algeria between 1881 and 1894.

== Early years (1838–81) ==
Alexandre Mauguin was born on 30 January 1838 in Allerey, Côte-d'Or. He was related to François Mauguin (1785–1854), a Representative during the French Second Republic in 1848 and 1849. The orator Francois Mauguin, who inspired the charter of July 1830 and was deputy of Beaune from 1827 to 1851, was his uncle. Alexandre Mauguin was unusually tall for the period at 2.1 metres (6 ft 11 in). Mauguin created the imprimerie Mauguin in Blida in 1847. He became mayor of Blida, a member of the general council of the department of Algiers, and vice-president of the general council.

== Politician (1881–94) ==
Mauguin ran for election as Republican candidate for the legislature on 21 August 1881 in the 2nd district of Algiers. He was elected by 3,596 votes against 2,675 for the outgoing member François Joseph Gastu^{(fr)}. In the house Mauguin voted with the majority, including for credits for the Tonkin Campaign.

On 25 January 1885 Mauguin was elected to the senate by 130 votes against 105 for the outgoing senator Ferdinand Lelièvre. He sat with the Republican majority, supported government policy, and voted for reinstatement of the district poll, for the draft Lisbonne law restricting freedom of the press, and for the Senate procedure against General Boulanger. His term ended on 6 January 1894. Mauguin ran for reelection to the senate in 1894. After obtaining only two votes in the first round, he withdrew from the second round. Paul Gérente was elected.

Alexandre Mauguin died on 4 March 1916 in Algiers, Algeria. The printing house was passed down from father to son until it was taken over by his great-granddaughter, Chantal Lefèvre, after her return from Spain to Algeria in 1993. As of 2014 the printing house was still producing books.

== Publications ==
Publications by Mauguin include:

=== As a deputy ===
- Mauguin, Alexandre (1882), Rapport fait au nom de la 8e commission d'intérêt local chargée d'examiner le projet de loi tendant à autoriser la ville de Versailles (Seine et Oise) à emprunter une somme de 3.500.000 fr. et à proroger une imposition extraordinaire, Impr. de A. Quantin
- Mauguin, Alexandre (1882), Rapport fait au nom de la 8e commission d'intérêt local chargée d'examiner le projet de loi tendant à autoriser la ville de Cholet (Maine-et-Loire) à emprunter une somme de 290.000 fr. et à s'imposer extraordinairement, Impr. de A. Quantin
- Mauguin, Alexandre (1882), Rapport fait au nom de la 8e commission d'intérêt local chargée d'examiner le projet de loi tendant à autoriser la ville de Montpellier (Hérault) à emprunter une somme de 8.284.000 fr. et à s'imposer extraordinairement, Impr. de A. Quantin
- Mauguin, Alexandre (1882), Rapport fait au nom de la 8e commission d'intérêt local chargée d'examiner le projet de loi tendant à autoriser le département d'Alger à contracter un emprunt de 4.280.000 fr. applicable au remboursement anticipé d'emprunts contractés antérieurement et à la construction d'édifices d'utilité départementale, Impr. de A. Quantin
- Mauguin, Alexandre (1882), Rapport fait au nom de la 8e commission d'intérêt local chargée d'examiner le projet de loi tendant à autoriser les hospices de Montpellier (Hérault) à contracter un emprunt et à approuver un engagement pris par la ville de Montpellier en vue du remboursement de cet emprunt, Impr. de A. Quantin

=== As a senator ===
- Mauguin, Alexandre (1885), Rapport fait, au nom de la 6e Commission d'intérêt local, chargée d'examiner le projet de loi, adopté par la Chambre des députés, tendant à autoriser le département du Rhône à changer l'affectation d'une portion de l'emprunt de 13,700,000 francs, autorisé par la loi du 3 mai 1881, Impr. de P. Mouillot
- Mauguin, Alexandre (1885), Rapport fait, au nom de la 6e Commission d'intérêt local, chargée d'examiner le projet de loi, adopté par la Chambre des députés, relatif à un échange de terrains boisés entre l'Etat et la commune de Trépail (Marne), Impr. de P. Mouillot
- Mauguin, Alexandre (1885), Rapport fait, au nom de la 6e Commission d'intérêt local, chargée d'examiner le projet de loi, adopté par la Chambre des députés, tendant à autoriser la commune de Blidah (département d'Alger), à emprunter 800,000 francs, Impr. de P. Mouillot
- Mauguin, Alexandre (1885), Rapport fait, au nom de la 6e Commission d'intérêt local, chargée d'examiner le projet de loi, adopté par la Chambre des députés, tendant à autoriser le département de la Corse à s'imposer extraordinairement pour les dépenses du personnel du service vicinal, Impr. de P. Mouillot
- Mauguin, Alexandre (1885), Rapport fait, au nom de la 6e Commission d'intérêt local, chargée d'examiner le projet de loi, adopté par la Chambre des députés, relatif à un échange de terrains, entre l'Etat et la commune de Ferté-Macé (Orne), Impr. de P. Mouillot
- Mauguin, Alexandre (1885), Rapport fait, au nom de la 6e Commission d'intérêt local, chargée d'examiner le projet de loi, adopté par la Chambre des députés, tendant à autoriser le département du Cher à créer des ressources extraordinaires pour diverses dépenses d'intérêt départemental, Impr. de P. Mouillot
- Mauguin, Alexandre (1885), Rapport fait, au nom de la 8e Commission d'intérêt local, chargée d'examiner le projet de loi, adopté par la Chambre des députés, tendant à autoriser le département des Basses-Alpes à contracter un emprunt pour les travaux de construction des écoles normales, Impr. de P. Mouillot
- Mauguin, Alexandre (1885), Rapport fait, au nom de la 8e Commission d'intérêt local, chargée d'examiner le projet de loi, adopté par la Chambre des députés, tendant à autoriser le département d'Oran à contracter un emprunt pour la construction d'une école normale d'institutrices, Impr. de P. Mouillot
- Mauguin, Alexandre (1885), Rapport fait, au nom de la Commission chargée d'examiner le projet de loi, ayant pour objet d'interdire la pêche aux étrangers dans les eaux territoriales de France et d'Algérie, Impr. de P. Mouillot
- Mauguin, Alexandre (1886), Rapport fait, au nom de la 3e Commission d'intérêt local, chargée d'examiner le projet de loi, adopté par la Chambre des députés, tendant à autoriser la commune de Blida (département d'Alger) à emprunter une somme de 40,900 francs, Impr. de P. Mouillot
- Mauguin, Alexandre (1886), Rapport fait, au nom de la 3e Commission d'intérêt local, chargée d'examiner le projet de loi, adopté par la Chambre des députés, tendant à introduire une disposition additionnelle à la loi du 10 août 1885 qui autorise la commune de Blida (département d'Alger) à emprunter 800,000 francs, Impr. de P. Mouillot
- Mauguin, Alexandre (1886), Rapport fait, au nom de la Commission chargée d'examiner le projet de loi, adopté par la Chambre des députés, tendant à autoriser la concession gratuite au département de la Seine, pour les enfants assistés, de terrains domaniaux situés en Algérie, Impr. de P. Mouillot
- Mauguin, Alexandre (1887), Rapport fait, au nom de la 2e Commission d'intérêt local, chargée d'examiner le projet de loi, adopté par la Chambre des députés, tendant à autoriser la commune de Blida (département d'Alger) à emprunter une somme de 389,854 francs, Impr. de P. Mouillot
- Mauguin, Alexandre (1888), Rapport fait, au nom de la 9e Commission d'intérêt local, chargée d'examiner le projet de loi, adopté par la Chambre des députés, tendant à autoriser la ville de Mustapha (département d'Alger) à emprunter 1,200,000 francs, Impr. de P. Mouillot
- Mauguin, Alexandre (1890), Rapport fait, au nom de la Commission chargée d'examiner la proposition de loi de MM. Hippolyte Morel, Emile Lenoël, Gilbert Le Guay, portant abrogation du paragraphe 7 de l'article 40 de la loi du 5 avril 1884, Impr. de P. Mouillot

== Sources ==
- Alexandre Mauguin (in French), Assemblée nationale
- Amrouni, Hassina AMROUNI (18 November 2014), "Librairie Mauguin", Memoria (in French)
- Jolly, Jean, ed. (1960), "MAUGUIN (ALEXANDRE)", Dictionnaire des parlementaires français de 1889 à 1940, Presses universitaires de France
- Mauguin, Alexandre (in French), BnF: Bibliotheque nationale de France
- Mohamed-Gaillard, Sarah; Romo-Navarette, Maria (2005), Des français outre-mer: une approche prosopographique au service de l'histoire contemporaine, Presses Paris Sorbonne, ISBN 978-2-84050-368-2
- Robert, Adolphe; Cougny, Gaston (1889–1891), "MAUGUIN (ALEXANDRE)", in Edgar Bourloton (ed.), Dictionnaire des Parlementaires français (1789–1889) (in French)
