= Thadée Gabrielli =

French lawyer, magistrate deputy and senator of Corsica

Thadée Jean Auguste Gabrielli

Deputy of Corsica
- In office 27 April 1902 – 3 January 1909

Senator of Corsica
- In office 3 January 1909 – 8 November 1920

Personal details
- Born: 7 August 1856 Tralonca, Corsica, France
- Died: 10 April 1940 (aged 83) Compiègne, Oise, France
- Occupation: Magistrate, Senator

Thadée Jean Auguste Gabrielli (7 August 1856 – 10 April 1940) was a French lawyer, magistrate deputy and senator of Corsica.

== Early years (1856–1902) ==
Thadée Gabrielli was born on 7 August 1856 in Tralonca, Corsica. He came from an old family from the Corte region. His brother Louis Gabrielli also became an advocate, and was general councillor of Moïta and Mayor of Zuani. Thadée Gabrielli had a classical education in Bastia, and studied law at the University of Aix-en-Provence. He obtained his license as a lawyer in 1879 and registered as an advocate at the bar of Corte in the Bastia Court of Appeal.

On 1 August 1886 Gabrielli was elected general councillor for the canton of Sermano in a strongly contested election. He was reelected without opposition in 1892 and 1898. He was general councillor of Sermanu until 1919. He was very active in the general council as rapporteur on local roads, rapporteur general on the budget, member of the departmental committee and secretary or vice-president of the departmental assembly on several occasions. Gabrielli became a magistrate in August 1892. He was in turn state prosecutor at the Sartène court and then the Ajaccio court. He married Lucie Campi (born 1871). In 1901 he became advocate general at the Bastia court of appeal.

== Politician (1902–1920) ==
Locations in Corsica

During the 1902 legislative elections out of loyalty to the Republican party he declined to oppose the incumbent deputy for Corte, Marius Giacobbi. Instead he ran as Republican candidate on 27 April 1902 in Sartène and was elected by 5,955 votes against 748 to the runner-up Jean-Paul Susini, a nationalist. In the chamber he sat with the democratic union group. In 1905 he tabled a draft resolution in the National Assembly on completion of the railway on the east coast of Corsica. In 1906 he published the newspaper Le Petit Sartenais. During the 20 May 1906 general election Gabrielli won 4,228 votes against 4,085 for his only competitor, Quilichini. The election was protested but was confirmed on 9 July 1906.

In 1909 Gabrielli ran in a senatorial by-election to replace two Corsian senators, Arthur Ranc and Emmanuel Arène, who had died. Gabrielli and Nicolas Péraldi were elected, Gabrielli with 678 votes and Péraldi with 530 against 259 for Dominique Forcioli, the nearest runner-up. During the triennial renewal Gabrielli, Paul Doumer and Antoine Gavini made a joint list, which was elected in full against the list of Paul de Casabianca. The former senators Casabianca and Giacobbi protested that the election had been marred by corruption, but did not give proof and the senate validated the election.

Gabrielli was a moderate but convinced Republican. He spent much of his parliamentary career defending the interests of Corsica. He often intervened in debates, particularly concerning the budget, advocating forest roads and railways from Ghisonaccia to Bonifacio, the Castelluccio penitentiary in Ajaccio, sanitation on the east coast and military service. He was also interested in issues related to the sea in general, was a member of the navy committee and discussed subjects such as the law of towing, the naval code of justice and sale of land on litoral islands. He was a member of the postal committee and other committees.

== Later career ==
Gabrielli resigned on 8 November 1920 ahead of the January 1921 renewal to accept a position as judge in the civil court of the Seine department. He spent six years as a judge before retiring on 8 August 1926. In 1937 he published a 239-page history of Corsica from its struggle for independence from Genoa to its annexation by France, and then its participation in the French government from the French Revolution to the time of writing. The work has been described as a "rather dry summary of facts and names". It is alleviated by a short but enthusiastic history of Napoleon.

Thadée Gabrielli died on 10 April 1940 in Compiègne, Oise.

== Publications ==
Publications by Gabrielli include:

- Gabrielli, Thadée (1937), La Corse : ses luttes pour l'indépendance, son annexion à la France : ses représentants, preface by Marius Roustan, Paris: Librairie Jacques Lanore, p. 237

== Sources ==
- Caporossi, Orsu Ghjuvanni, "Reperstoire des Personnages", Cronica di A Corsica (in French)
- Jolly, Jean, ed. (1960), "GABRIELLI (THADÉE, JEAN, AUGUSTE)", dictionnaire des parlementaires français de 1889 à 1940, Presses universitaires de France
- Kollewijn, Pieter H (Spring 1938), "Reviewed Work: La Corse: Ses luttes pour l'Indépendance: son annexion à la France by Thadée Gabrielli", Books Abroad, 12 (2), Board of Regents of the University of Oklahoma, doi:10.2307/40079454, JSTOR 40079454
- Lunel, Louis, "Lucie CAMPI", Geneanet (in French)
- Thadée Gabrielli (1856-1940) (in French), BnF: Bibliotheque nationale de France
