= Péraldi =

Péraldi, Peraldi is an Italian and Corsican surname. Notable people with the surname include:

- François Peraldi (1938–1993), Canadian psychoanalyst and linguist
- Nicolas Péraldi (1841–1914), French notary who was Deputy of Corsica, then Senator of Corsica
