= List of senators of Corsica =

Location of Corsica in France

Following is a List of senators of Corsica, people who have represented the department of Corsica in the Senate of France. The department was divided into Corse-du-Sud and Haute-Corse in 1975.

== Third Republic ==
Senators for Corsica under the French Third Republic were:

Start	End	Senator	Notes
18 February 1871	7 March 1876	Jérôme Galloni d'Istria	
30 January 1876	26 March 1879	Jean Joseph Valéry	Died in office
22 June 1879	24 January 1885	Joseph Marie Piétri	Lost reelection to Paul de Casabianca
1885 renewal
25 January 1885	7 January 1894	Nicolas Péraldi	
25 January 1885	7 January 1894	Paul de Casabianca	
22 April 1888	13 October 1888	Patrice de Corsi	Replaced Hippolyte Carnot, life senator, who had died Died in office
13 January 1889	29 May 1892	François Morelli	Elected to replace Patrice de Corsi. Died in office
21 August 1892	7 January 1894	Ange Muracciole	By-election after death of Morelli
1894 renewal
7 January 1894	3 January 1903	Paul de Casabianca	Defeated by Émile Combes, who did not take office. Arthur Ranc was elected on 15 February 1903.
7 January 1894	3 January 1903	Vincent Farinole	Replaced Muracciole
7 January 1894	9 March 1894	François Pitti-Ferrandi	Died in office
3 June 1894	3 January 1903	Jacques Hébrard	By-election after death of François Pitti-Ferrandi.
1903 renewal
4 January 1903	2 July 1904	Ange Muracciole	Replaced Farinole; Died in office
15 February 1903	10 April 1908	Arthur Ranc	Replaced Émile Combes, who did not take office. Died in office
4 January 1903	6 January 1912	Marius Giacobbi	
18 September 1904	15 August 1908	Emmanuel Arène	Died in office
3 January 1909	7 January 1912	Thadée Gabrielli	By-election to replace Ranc and Arène
3 January 1909	6 January 1912	Nicolas Péraldi	By-election to replace Ranc and Arène
1912 renewal
7 January 1912	8 November 1920	Thadée Gabrielli	Resigned
7 January 1912	13 January 1920	Antoine Gavini	Resigned
7 January 1912	9 January 1921	Paul Doumer	
11 April 1920	9 January 1921	Jean-François Gallini	
1921 renewal
9 January 1921	20 April 1923	Jean-François Gallini	Died in office
9 January 1921	14 January 1930	Émile Sari	
9 January 1921	14 January 1930	Paul Doumer	
8 July 1923	10 April 1924	François Coty	By-election to replace Gallini; Election annulled
29 June 1924	6 September 1931	Joseph Giordan	
1930 renewal
14 January 1930	13 February 1930	Adolphe Landry	Resigned
14 January 1930	9 June 1931	Paul Doumer	Resigned
14 January 1930	9 June 1937	Émile Sari	Died in office
11 May 1930	10 January 1939	Paul Lederlin	
6 September 1931	9 January 1939	Joseph Giordan	
5 September 1937	10 January 1939	Alexandre Musso	Replaced Émile Sari
1939 renewal
10 January 1939	21 Octobre 1945	François Pitti-Ferrandi	
10 January 1939	21 October 1945	Paul Giacobbi	
10 January 1939	21 October 1945	Paul Lederlin	

== Fourth Republic ==
Senators for Corsica under the French Fourth Republic were:

- François Vittori (1946–1948)
- Adolphe Landry (1946–1955)
- Pierre Romani (1948–1955)
- Jean Filippi (1955–1959)
- Jean-Paul de Rocca-Serra (1955–1959)

== Fifth Republic ==
Senators for Corsica under the French Fifth Republic:

- Jean-Paul de Rocca-Serra (1959–1962)
- Jacques Faggianelli (1959–1962)
- Jean Filippi (1962–1975 (end of mandate in 1980)
- Francois Giacobbi (1962–1975 (end of mandate in 1980)

== Sources ==
- Liste des anciens sénateurs de la IIIème République par circonscription (in French), Sénat de France
- Liste des anciens sénateurs de la IVème République par circonscription (in French), Sénat de France
- Liste des anciens sénateurs de la Vème République par circonscription (in French), Sénat de France
