= Muracciole (disambiguation) =

Muracciole is a commune in the Haute-Corse department of France on the island of Corsica.

Muracciole may also refer to:

- Ange Muracciole (1835–1904), French public works contractor, Senator for Corsica from 1892-94 and 1903-04
- Marie Muracciole, writer and curator based in Paris and Beirut
