= Nicolas Péraldi =

French notary (1841–1914)

Nicolas Joseph Péraldi

Deputy of Corsica
- In office 2 September 1881 – 25 January 1885

Senator of Corsica
- In office 25 January 1885 – 7 January 1894
- Preceded by: Joseph Marie Piétri
- Succeeded by: François Pitti-Ferrandi; Vincent Farinole

Senator of Corsica
- In office 3 January 1909 – 6 January 1912
- Preceded by: Arthur Ranc; Emmanuel Arène

Personal details
- Born: 18 March 1841 Ajaccio, Corsica, France
- Died: 18 February 1914 (aged 72) Paris, France
- Occupation: Notary, politician

Nicolas Joseph Péraldi (18 March 1841 – 18 February 1914) was a French notary who was Republican deputy of Corsica from 1881 to 1885, then senator of Corsica from 1885 to 1894 and again from 1909 to 1912.

== Early years (1841–81) ==
Nicolas Joseph Péraldi was born on 18 March 1841 in Ajaccio, Corsica. He earned a licence in law and became a notary in Ajaccio on 28 July 1866. He became president of the Chamber of Notaries of Ajaccio. He was elected municipal councilor in August 1870, second on the list. After the fall of the Second French Empire he was confirmed in the municipal administration on 10 September 1870. He was reelected municipal councilor on 22 November 1874.

Péraldi was made Mayor of Ajaccio on 28 March 1876. He was mayor during the 16 May 1877 crisis. His appointment as mayor was revoked by decree on 26 June 1877. (Note: A notice itemizing steps in his career held in the Léonore database of the national archives says his appointment as mayor was revoked by decree of 26 June 1876. This conflicts with the official biography which says he was removed from office after the 16 May 1877 crisis.) He was reinstated as mayor on 23 December 1877. He was again elected municipal councilor on 13 January 1878, and was appointed Mayor of Ajaccio on 25 June 1878. He was named a Knight of the Legion of Honour by decree of 26 July 1879. He was elected to the General Council of Corsica in August 1880. In 1881 Bonapartists loyal Victor, Prince Napoléon, removed Peraldi from his office as mayor.

== Deputy (1881–85) ==
Péraldi was elected to the legislature on 2 September 1881 on the second ballot by 6,850 votes against 5,771 for M. Cunéo d'Ornano. He represented the Ajaccio-Sartène constituency. He sat on the left, voted consistently with the Opportunist Republicans majority, supported the Léon Gambetta and Jules Ferry ministries, and voted for credits for the Tonkin Campaign. However, he would not vote for the separation of church and state.

== First term as senator (1885–94) ==
Péraldi was elected Senator of Corsica on 25 January 1885, holding office until 7 January 1894. In the senate he abstained on the vote over the expulsion of the princes in June 1886, voted for reestablishment of the district ballot, for the draft Lisbonne law restricting freedom of the press. He abstained from the vote on the procedure to be followed in the senate against General Boulanger. He served in the congress committee and then the committee on petitions. He ran for reelection in the triennial renewal of 7 January 1894, but of the outgoing senators only Pierre de Casabianca was reelected. Two new senators won election: François Pitti-Ferrandi with 415 votes and Vincent Farinole with 409 votes.

== Later career (1894–1914) ==
Péraldi ran in the senate by-election of 3 June 1894 to replace Pitti-Ferrandi, who had died, but lost by 370 votes against 377 for Jacques Hébrard, a former senator of French India and director of Le Temps. Given the slim margin of defeat, Péraldi protested to the Senate's 4th bureau, claiming various irregularities in the poll, but on 5 July 1894 the Senate ruled in favour of Hébrard. Péraldi did not run for reelection in the triennial renewal of 4 January 1903, or in the by-elections of 15 February 1903 and 18 September 1904.

Péraldi ran in the by-election of 3 January 1909 held to replace Arthur Ranc and Emmanuel Arène, who had both died. He was elected with 530 votes, and the deputy Thadée Gabrielli won the other seat with 678 votes. Over the next three years Péraldi spent most of his time in the senate with the committee on petitions. He did not run for reelection in the triennial renewal of 1912. He left office on 6 January 1912. Péraldi died at his home in Paris on 18 February 1914 at the age of 73. His funeral was held on 21 February 1914, and he was interred in Père Lachaise Cemetery.

== Sources ==
- Casta, François J. (1974), Le diocèse d'Ajaccio (in French), Editions Beauchesne, GGKEY:KBKELWRL4H0
- Jolly, Jean, ed. (1960), "PÉRALDI (NICOLAS, JOSEPH)", dictionnaire des parlementaires français de 1889 à 1940, Presses universitaires de France
- PERALDI Nicolas (in French), Sénat de France
- "PERALDI Nicolas Joseph", Léonore (in French), Ministry of Culture
- Pierazzi, Ange (June 2006), Du bonapartisme en général au bonapartisme ajaccien en particulier (in French), Accademia Corsa di Nizza
- Robert, Adolphe; Cougny, Gaston (1889–1891), "PÉRALDI (NICOLAS-JOSEPH)", in Edgar Bourloton (ed.), Dictionnaire des Parlementaires français (1789–1889) (in French)
