= Ange Muracciole =

French public works contractor and politician

Ange-Marie Muracciole
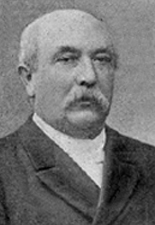

Senator of Corsica
- In office 21 August 1892 – 7 janvier 1894
- Preceded by: François Morelli
- Succeeded by: Vincent Farinole

Senator of Corsica
- In office 4 January 1903 – 2 July 1904
- Preceded by: Vincent Farinole
- Succeeded by: Emmanuel Arène

Personal details
- Born: 12 March 1835 Muracciole, Corsica, France
- Died: 2 July 1904 (aged 69) Ajaccio, Corsica, France
- Occupation: public works contractor and politician

Ange-Marie Muracciole (12 March 1835 – 2 July 1904) was a French public works contractor and politician. He was Senator for Corsica from 1892 to 1894, and again from 1903 to 1904.

== Early years (1835–92) ==
Ange-Marie Muracciole was born on 12 March 1835 in Muracciole, Corsica. His parents were Bartolomeo Muracciole (1808–58) and Maria Costa. On 19 January 1858 he married Madeleine Pantalacci (born 1838) in Muracciole.

Muracciole became a public works contractor. He had gained a solid reputation when work began on the Panama Canal in 1881, and was invited to participate. He returned to Corsica when the work was suspended. He was mayor of Belgodère and general councilor of Vezzani. On 29 July 1886 his second marriage was to Rose Marie Casanelli d'Istria (1864–1931) in Muracciole.

== Senator (1892–94) ==
On 21 August 1892 Muracciole ran for election to the Senate in a by-election following the death of François Morelli. He was elected in the first round by 382 votes against 372 for Vincent Farinole. He joined the democratic left group. Due to illness he was forced to seek leave in 1892 before speaking in the senate. In the general elections of 7 January 1894 he was defeated by Farinole, who won 409 votes to 272 for Muracciole.

== Later career (1894–1904) ==
Muracciole returned to private life, running his business and acting in his local political posts. The journal Le Républicain (Bastia), founded as a daily in 1895, reappeared on 12 April 1898 to support the Republican candidates Emmanuel Arène, Muracciole, Marius Giacobbi, Colonel Astima and Toussain Malaspina in the 8 May 1898 legislative elections. In 1901 Muracciole became general councilor for the canton of Vico, replacing Dominique Cristinacce. He was also a censor at the Ajjacio branch of the Bank of France.

Muracciole ran once more for election to the senate on 4 January 1903, and decisively defeated Farinole by 581 votes to 113. His health again prevented him from spending much time in the Senate. He died in office on 2 July 1904 in Ajaccio at the age of 69.

The village of Muracciole is distinguished by a Gothic Revival château built in the late 19th century by Ange Muracciole. It is a rare example of this type of architecture on Corsica. The house was built by Muracciole after he returned from the Panama Canal. The village also has a funeral chapel for his family.

== Sources ==
- Croc, Jean Pierre, "Ange MURACCIOLE", Geneanet
- Jolly, Jean, ed. (1960), "MURACCIOLE (ANGE-MARIE)", Dictionnaire des parlementaires français de 1889 à 1940, Presses universitaires de France
- Jolly, Jean, ed. (1960b), "PITTI-FERRANDI (FRANÇOIS-MARIE)", Dictionnaire des parlementaires français de 1889 à 1940, Presses universitaires de France
- Le Républicain (Bastia) (in French), BnF: Bibliotheque nationale de France
- Les Poggiolais (20 March 2015), Les conseillers généraux de Vico (in French)
- "Muracciole", Petit Futé (in French)
- Muracciole (in French), Università di Corsica Pasquale Paoli
- MURACCIOLE Ange (in French), Sénat de France
