= François Pitti-Ferrandi =

French doctor and politician

François-Marie Pitti-Ferrandi
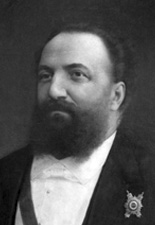

Senator for Corsica
- In office 7 January 1894 – 9 March 1894
- Preceded by: Nicolas Péraldi
- Succeeded by: Jacques Hébrard

Personal details
- Born: 22 February 1838 Pietra-di-Verde, Corsica, France
- Died: 9 March 1894 (aged 56) Paris, France
- Occupation: Doctor, politician

François-Marie Pitti-Ferrandi (22 February 1838 – 9 March 1894) was a French doctor and politician who was briefly Senator for Corsica.

== Early years ==
François Pitti-Ferrandi was born on 22 February 1838 in Pietra-di-Verde, Corsica. He attended the lycée of Bastia for his secondary education. He studied medicine at the Faculty of Paris, then returned to Bastia to practice his profession at the lycée.

== Politics ==
Pitti-Ferrandi's family had been involved in politics, and he became a municipal councillor in Bastia. He then represented the canton of Corte, where he had been born, in the general council of Corsica, where he replaced one of his brothers. In 1885 another of his brothers took his seat in the general council, while he became general councilor for his wife's canton of Muro. In 1889 he ran unsuccessfully for election to the senate to replace Patrice de Corsi, who had died. In 1892 he again ran unsuccessfully to replace François Morelli, who had died.

Pitti-Ferrandi was elected senator for Corsica on 7 January 1894. He won 415 out of 747 votes, and sat with the republican left. He died unexpectedly on 9 March 1894 at a party at the home of his friend Sébastien Gavini^{(fr)}, a deputy for Corsica.

== Sources ==
- Jolly, Jean, ed. (1960), "PITTI-FERRANDI (FRANÇOIS-MARIE)", dictionnaire des parlementaires français de 1889 à 1940, Presses universitaires de France
- Pitti-Ferrandi François (in French), Senat de France
