= Vincent Farinole =

French advocate

Vincent-Marie Farinole

Senator of Corsica
- In office 7 January 1894 – 3 January 1903
- Preceded by: Ange Muracciole
- Succeeded by: Ange Muracciole

Personal details
- Born: 1 September 1832 Sigean, Aude. France
- Died: 16 September 1905 (aged 73) Bastia, Corsica, France
- Occupation: Lawyer, politician

Vincent-Marie Farinole (1 September 1832 – 16 September 1905) was a French advocate who was Senator of Corsica from 1894 to 1903.

== Early years (1832–70) ==
Vincent-Marie Farinole was born on 1 September 1832 in Sigean, Aude. His parents were Joseph Farinole^{(fr)} (1792–1887) and Philippine Benoîte Mathieu. He came from an old Coriscan family with several members who were notable before the French Revolution. He attended a Jesuit school for a classical education, then went on the Lycée Charlemagne and the Lycée Saint-Louis in Paris. He studied law at the University of Aix-en-Provence, then after obtaining his license enrolled as an advocate at the Bar of Bastia in 1856, where he pleaded until 1870. He married around 1865 and had a daughter, Magdeleine Juliette Louise Clélie Farinole (1872–1946).

Although his family had ties with the Bonapartistes of Corsica, Farinole held strong Republican opinions and was an opponent of the Second French Empire. In 1869 he was one of the co-founders of the weekly La Revanche with Patrice de Corsi, Louis Tommasi and Léonard Limperani. There was a violent controversy between the editors of this paper and prince Pierre Napoléon Bonaparte. During it Farinole sent a letter to the Paris correspondent Paschal Grousset that made him send witnesses to challenge the prince to a duel. One of the Grousset's witnesses was Victor Noir, who would be tragically killed in Auteuil. Farinole campaigned against the 1870 constitutional referendum in Corsica and publicly voted "No" on 8 May 1870.

== Third Republic (1870–1905) ==
After the fall of the empire on 4 September 1870 Farinole's life was in danger in Corsica and he went to Paris as an officer of the National Guard to defend the capital. On 4 September 1870 Adolphe Crémieux, Minister of Justice of the National Defense Government, appointed Farinole public prosecutor in Bastia, Corsica. In 1873 Jules Armand Dufaure appointed him a judge in Le Havre. He returned to Bastia as Advocate General. He was dismissed by the first cabinet of Albert de Broglie after the fall of Adolphe Thiers on 25 May 1873. In 1879 under the government of William Waddington he was appointed adviser to the Bastia court of appeal by the Minister of Justice Philippe Le Royer. He was then named honorary adviser to the court of appeal of Aix-en-Provence. He was elected in turn general councillor of the cantons of Murato and Ghisoni. He became vice-president of the Corsican general council.

Farinole was elected Senator of Corsica on 7 January 1894, holding office until 3 January 1903. He was elected in the first round of voting by 409 votes against 349 for Nicolas Péraldi and 272 for Ange Muracciole. He sat with the Republican Left group. In the senate he denounced abuses in Corsica by political appointees in the island's judiciary, called for improvement of maritime and postal links to the island, called for action against forest fires and deforestation, called for a stronger garrison, pointed out health issues and submitted a proposal to fight electoral fraud. He failed to be reelected in the 1903 renewal, when Muracciole and Émile Combes were elected. (Note: A few days later Combes chose to represent Charente-Inférieure, where he had also been elected. On 15 February 1903 Arthur Ranc was elected to replace Combes.)

Farinole died on 16 September 1905 in Bastia.

== Publications ==
Publications by Farinole include:

- Vincent-Marie Farinole (1857), Discours ... sur la tombe de M. Vincent-Louis Pierangeli, avocat à la cour impériale, décédé à Bastia le 8 juillet 1857, Bastia: imprimerie Fabiani, p. 6
- Vincent-Marie Farinole; Lucien Chersia (1857), Discours prononcés sur la tombe de M. Vincent-Louis Pierangeli, avocat..., Bastia: imprimerie Fabiani, p. 8

== Sources ==
- Caporossi (b), Orsu Ghjuvanni, "Répertoire des Personnages", Cronica di A CORSICA (in French)
- FARINOLE Vincent (in French), Sénat de France
- Garric, Alain, "Vincent FARINOLE", Geneanet
- Jolly, Jean, ed. (1960), "FARINOLE (VINCENT, MARIE)", dictionnaire des parlementaires français de 1889 à 1940, Presses universitaires de France
- Jolly, Jean, ed. (1960b), "RANC (ARTHUR)", dictionnaire des parlementaires français de 1889 à 1940, Presses universitaires de France
- Vincent-Marie Farinole (1832-1905) (in French), BnF: Bibliotheque nationale de France
