= Giacobbi =

Giacobbi is a surname and may refer to:

- Girolamo Giacobbi (1567–c.1629), Italian choirmaster, conductor, and composer
- Marius Giacobbi (1846–1919), French lawyer who was deputy or senator for Corsica
- Paul Giacobbi (born 1957), French deputy until 2017
