= François Morelli =

French shipowner and politician

Senator of Corsica
- In office 13 January 1889 – 29 May 1892
- Preceded by: Patrice de Corsi
- Succeeded by: Ange-Marie Muracciole

Personal details
- Born: 28 February 1833 Bocognano, Corsica, France
- Died: 13 January 1889 (aged 55) Marseille, Bouches-du-Rhône, France
- Occupation: Shipowner, politician

François Morelli (28 February 1833 – 29 May 1892) was a French shipowner and politician. For a while he ran a shipping service in the western Mediterranean based in Marseille, but it suffered from severe competition and several business mishaps. After he was elected senator, his business declined further and was then declared bankrupt. He died in office shortly after its assets were sold at auction.

== Early years ==
François Morelli was born on 28 February 1833 in Bocognano, Corsica. He came from a Bocognano family that had caused Napoleon some trouble in 1793. His parents both worked on the land. He gained a secondary education, then was employed by various businesses in Corsica. In 1869 Morelli became special railway commissioner in Nice.

After the fall of the Second French Empire, Morelli became director of food and restaurants for the Compagnie de navigation des paquebots de la Méditerranée (Mediterranean Packet Boat Navigation Company), owned by Count Jean Joseph Valéry. He became one of the main partners of Count Valéry, whose shipping company had 25 ships in the western Mediterranean based in Marseille. The ships sailed from there to Corsica, Spain, Italy and Algeria. Valéry was also the Bonapartist general councillor for the canton of Brando from 1871 to 1879. After he was elected a senator in 1876, his company was poorly managed. Valéry died on 26 March 1879 at the age of 53. When Count Valéry died in 1879, Morelli became president of the shipping company.

The Valéry family abandoned their business in March 1883 and sold the remaining 11 ships of their fleet to a company organized by Morelli with other Corsican capitalists to fight the Compagnie Fraissinet hegemony on Corsica. The company was named Compagnie insulaire de navigation à vapeur Morelli (Morelli Island Steam Navigation Company). It was founded on 9 March 1883 and served the ports of Marseille, Nice, Bastia, Ajaccio, Livorno, Calvi, L'Île-Rousse, Propriano and Bonifacio. It obtained the concession for postal service between Marseille and Corsica, Sardinia and Livorno. Morelli ordered two more ships, Bocognano, delivered in 1884, and Ville de Bastia. (Note: Ships of the Morelli company included: Congo, 825.76; Ville De Malaga, 470.95; Vannina, 475.34; Comte Bacciochi, 331.18; Comte Valery, 347.20; Ministre Abbatucci, 397.58; Sampiero, 396.68; Evenement, 221.53; Perseverant, 190.40; Spahis, 340.00; Jean Mathieu, 255.25; Bocognano, 490.25 (sold, became Monte Toro); Ville de Bastia, 490.25) He was made a knight of the Legion of Honour.

In 1885, the government of Haiti requested four ships for postal service, which Morelli dispatched. However, due to misunderstanding caused by the very slow communications between Paris and Port-au-Prince, the Haitians made a deal with another company before Morelli's ships arrived. The ships spent several months at anchor in Haiti before returning to Le Havre. Morelli took a considerable loss and had to borrow to pay his crews, who were mostly Corsicans. His ships, which had cost about 1,000,000 francs, were seized and sold at auction for 80,000 francs. The company suffered from two shipwrecks that made it impossible to conduct the postal service between the continent and Corsica. The Compagnie Fraissinet started a service that took 15 hours to reach Bastia from Marseille, and took over the postal concession.

== Politics ==
As Morelli rose in shipping society and in Bonapartist circles, he began to become involved in the politics of the French Third Republic. In 1874 he was elected Bonapartist general councillor for the canton of Bocognano, holding office until 1881. During his election campaign, a bonfire was lit beside his home in Marseille and drinks and food were offered to his supporters according to the island tradition. After Valéry's death in 1879, Morelli moved to the republicans and became a follower of Emmanuel Arène. He used his company to reward republican voters, either with free passage during elections or with jobs. In 1884, the company gave several thousand francs to Emmanuel Arène and Nicolas Péraldi for campaign expenses. In 1886, Morelli's company was accused by Sampiero Porri (1857–1926) in the journal Le Pilori of giving Arène and Peraldi regular monthly cash payments in return for allocation of the postal concession. Morelli ran for election to the Senate in 1888, but was defeated.

In 1889 Arène helped ensure that Morelli was elected senator of Corsica. He was nominated a Moderate Republican candidate in a by-election that followed the death of Patrice de Corsi. He was elected senator of Corsica on 13 January 1889. He won 363 votes to 356 for François Pitti-Ferrandi. He sat with the centre-left, voted for the draft Lisbonne law restricting the freedom of the press, and abstained from the vote on the process against General Boulanger. In 1890 he accompanied Marie François Sadi Carnot, President of France, on his official visit to Corsica. He voted for the law on workplace accidents, for the election of deputies in a single-name ballot, for laws penalizing the press for insult and defamation of the President of France, ministers, deputies, senators and public office holders, and for the principle of a tax quota for buildings. He was a member of the Committee for Petitions. He did not speak in public.

== Business failure and death ==
Morelli suffered from poor health, and this, coupled with concerns about his Compagnie insulaire de navigation à vapeur, kept him away from the senate, particularly from 1891. His company was in poor financial condition, and Morelli did not manage it well while engaged in the senate. The Compagnie insulaire de navigation à vapeur, F. Morelli et Cie was declared bankrupt by two judgments pronounced by the Marseilles commercial court on 17 April 1891 and 5 May 1891, confirmed by the Aix-en-Provence court of appeal on 5 August 1891. On 16 May 1892 Le Phare de la Corse reported that five steamers of the former Morelli company had been auctioned at the Marseille stock exchange for one million francs. The Fraissinet company acquired the steamers Bocognano, Ville de Bastia, Comte Bacciochi, Persévérant and Evénement. The collapse of his company caused the loss of the savings of several small capitalists who had lent money to Morelli. He died on 29 May 1892 at his country estate in Aygalades, near Marseille, at the age of 59.

== Sources ==
- Jolly, Jean (1960), "MORELLI (FRANÇOIS)", Dictionnaire des parlementaires français (1889–1940) (in French), Presses Universitaires de France
- MORELLI François (in French), Sénat de France
- Phocée, Sergio de; Laheyne, Daniel (1 November 2014), "Morelli F. et Cie.", Wrechsite
- Pellegrinetti, Jean-Paul (2011), "Migrations et pratiques politiques : les Corses de 1870 à 1914", Revue d'histoire politique (in French), 3 (HS 7): 115–129, doi:10.3917/parl.hs07.0115
- Pellegrinetti, Jean-Paul (2015), "Notables et réseaux politiques en Corse, XIXe- XXe siècle. L'exemple d'Emmanuel Arène (1856–1908)", Histoire@Politique (in French), 1 (25), Centre d'histoire de Sciences Po: 24ff, doi:10.3917/hp.025.0024
- Pomponi, Francis; Usciati, Jean-Jacques (2016), "Sampiero Porri (1857-1926) journaliste politique : le parcours atypique d'un « vrai républicain", Cahiers de la Méditerranée (in French), 92
- Robert, Adolphe; Cougny, Gaston (1889–1891), "MORELLI (FRANÇOIS)", in Edgar Bourloton (ed.), Dictionnaire des Parlementaires français (1789–1889) (in French)
- Silvani, Paul (2005), "Le naufrage de la Compagnie Morelli", Corse Matin (in French)
