= Jean Joseph Valéry =

French politician (1828–1879)

Joseph Valéry
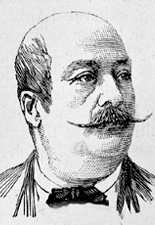

Senator of Corsica
- In office 30 January 1876 – 26 March 1879 (died)
- Succeeded by: Joseph Marie Piétri

Personal details
- Born: 1828 Bastia, Corsica, France
- Died: 26 March 1879 (aged 50–51) Florence, Italy
- Occupation: Diplomat, politician

Count Jean Joseph Valéry (1828 – 26 March 1879) was a French shipowner and politician who was Senator of Corsica in 1876–79. He inherited a line of steamships for passenger, cargo and mail services that he greatly expanded to operate between southern France, Corsica, Italy, Spain and Algeria. Later the company ran into difficulty with growing competition, and after his death the ships were sold off.

== Background ==
Joseph Valéry was born in 1828 in Bastia, Corsica. (Note: The official dictionary of French parliamentarians gives his birth year as 1828. Another source gives a birthdate of 1822. A book about the Valéry company says he was aged 58 when he died on 26 March 1879, which indicates the earlier date.) His father was Jean-Mathieu Valéry. The Compagnie Valery frères was founded on 9 November 1840 in Bastia by the brothers Jean-Mathieu and Joseph Valéry. (Note: The poet Paul Valéry (1871–1945) was descended from Jean-Mathieu Valéry. Paul Valéry was the son of Barthélémy Valéry (1825-87) a customs official in Bastia, son of Ambroise Valéry (died 1833).) The brothers were from Poretta-Brando, from a family of sailors of Cap Corse. They established the first line served by a steamship between Bastia, Corsica, and Livorno, then in the Grand Duchy of Tuscany. In 1843 the limited company Joseph et Frères Valéry was founded with five ships: Télégraph, Golo, Ambassadeur Pozzo di Borgo, Maréchal Sebastiani and Letizia. The company offered two return trips per week from Marseille to Bastia and Marseille to Ajaccio.

In 1845 the Compagnie Valéry placed an order with the shipyard of La Ciotat for the steamship Bonaparte, an innovative design with an iron hull and a propeller. Construction started that year, but was long and difficult. The Bonaparte was launched on 17 January 1847. The trials gave excellent results, with much lower fuel consumption per horsepower per hour than paddle boats. On 19 October 1847 the Bonaparte collided with the Comte de Paris during the night and sank. Between 1840 and 1883 forty-six ships flew the flag of the Compagnie Valéry. In 1850 Valery Freres took over the dispatch service abandoned by the French government's postal packet boats.

== Shipowner ==
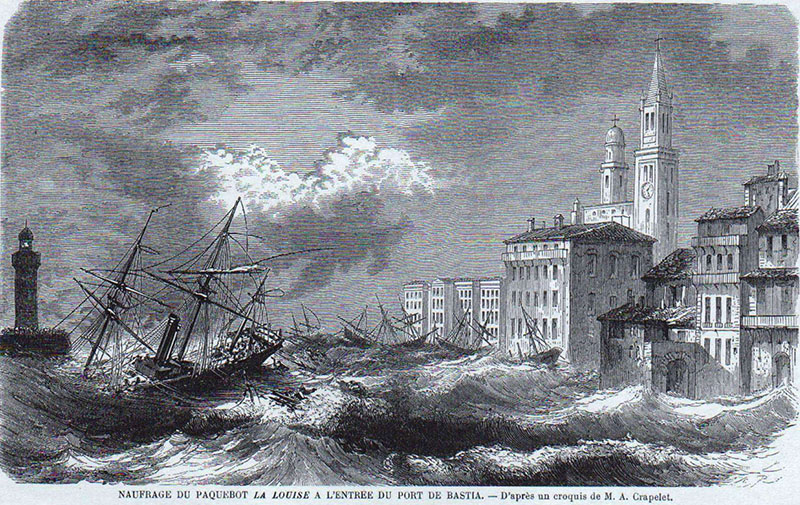
Shipwreck of the packet boat La Louise at the entry of the port of Bastia on 23 February 1860

Jean-Mathieu Valéry died in 1854 and Jean Joseph Valéry became the partner of his uncle Joseph. The company became the Compagnie Maritime Valery Frères & Fils. The company provided postal service between Marseille and Corsica. In 1856 Valéry was named president of the Bastia Chamber of Commerce. In 1856 the fleet was enlarged with the addition of the Ajaccio, Bastia, Progrès, Industrie, Louise, Jean-Mathieu, Insulaire and Générale Abbatucci. The 150 horsepower / 61.9 metres (203 ft) ship Roi Jérôme was built for the company in 1861 in Scotland. It was renamed the Comte Joseph Valery in 1877. (Note: The Comte Joseph Valery was shipwrecked by stranding on 5 January 1892 in the Bay of Barcaggio. The Maréchal Canrobert was sunk near Le Planier^{(fr)}. The 28 horsepower Ambassadeur Pozzo di Borgo (Nantes 1843) was wrecked in 1851 1 kilometre (0.62 mi) from the coast of Scalone. The 120 horsepower 55.7 metres (183 ft) Louise (Greenock, Scotland, 1855) sank on 23 February 1860 at the entrance to the port of Bastia. The 120 horsepower 52.5 metres (172 ft) Jean Mathieu (Dunkirk, 1855) was wrecked on 12 February 1892 near Girolata^{(fr)} on a voyage from Bastia to Nice. The 120 horsepower 57.3 metres (188 ft) Général Abbatucci (Greenock, 1857) was sunk by the Norwegian sailing ship Edouard Hwidt on 7 May 1869 25 miles (40 km) from Calvi. The treasure of the Général Abbatucci was raised in 1996 and sold at auction in Christie's of London. The 120 horsepower 56.28 metres (184.6 ft) Evenement (Greenock, 1862) was lost on the Lavezzi islands on 21 January 1893.) Valéry married Hortense Piccioni. Their daughter Marie Antoinette Valéry (c. 1858–1940) married Jean Casimir de Galard de Brassac de Béarn (1852–1910).

In 1861 the elder Joseph Valéry died and his nephew Joseph became the sole manager of the Compagnie des Paquebots de la Méditerranée. Joseph Valéry established himself in Paris as one of the leaders of French maritime trade. He became master of the Grand Orient de France Freemason lodge "la parfaite harmonie française" in Bastia. He was made a papal count by Pope Pius IX. Under Valéry the fleet expanded from 12 to 33 ships, and the capital from 120,000 to 12 million francs. The company provided cabotage service to the Corsican ports, operated lines between Corsica and Marseille, Nice, Toulon and Sardinia as well as links from Marseille to Tunisia, Algeria and Spain. Valery used his wealth to build a splendid mansion in Bastia, demolished in the 1950s.

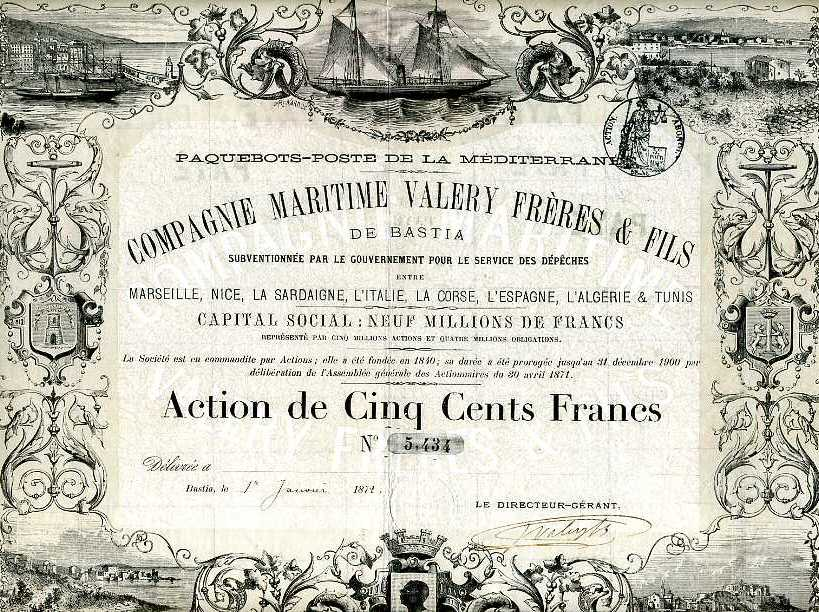
500 franc action for the Compagnie Maritime Valery Frères & Fils, 1872

An agreement was made on 10 July 1862 between Valéry and Édouard Vandal^{(fr)}, Director General of Posts, for the company to run a weekly postal service between Nice and alternately Ajaccio and Bastia. An imperial decree of 25 April 1863 conformed this postal service concession. The fleet was also granted the concession by the Italian state to provide the postal service between Genoa, Italy and Sicily, although all the ships flew the French flag. After 18 years of monopoly, in 1868 the Compagnie Fraissinet became a competitor. On 11 June 1870 Valéry's company won the concession for postal service and transport between France and Algeria, and on the eastern part of the Algerian coast. After the fall of the Second French Empire in 1870 François Morelli became director of food and restaurants for Valéry's company. He became one of Valéry's main partners. In 1873 the company lost the Corsican postal service concession to the Fraissinet company.

== Politician ==
Valéry was a general councilor for Bastia. He served as vice-consul of Spain, Austria and Greece and consul of Portugal. He was made a Knight of the Legion of Honour, and received many foreign decorations. Valéry was also the Bonapartist general councillor for the canton of Brando from 1871 to 1879. Valéry was elected Senator of Corsica on 30 January 1876 by 288 votes out of 476. During his campaign he was given strong support by Eugène Rouher, Denis Gavini and Jean-Charles Abbatucci. His election was validated despite the fact that he had given senatorial electors free transport and food on one of his boats, from where they went under escort to vote. In the senate he sat with the Bonapartist Appel au peuple group. He voted for the dissolution of the chamber demanded by the ministry of de Broglie. After Valéry was elected a senator his company was poorly managed. Due to bad health he had to spend the winter in Florence, where he died on 26 March 1879. He was aged 58.

== Legacy ==
On 22 June 1879 Valéry was replaced in the senate by Joseph Marie Piétri. Morelli became president of the company. Valéry's son and heir Jean-Mathieu squandered the company's capital recklessly. In 1878 the company had 27 steamboats. 12 of these were sold by a private deed of 6 December 1880 to the Compagnie Générale Transatlantique to clear a bond debt. By 1883 the company was ruined and Jean-Mathieu Valéry went into exile in Venezuela. The Valéry family abandoned its business and in March 1883 sold the remaining 11 ships of its fleet to a company organized by Morelli with other Corsican capitalists to fight the Compagnie Fraissinet hegemony on Corsica. Valery's tomb, in Carrara marble is in a mausoleum a few hundred yards from the village of Erbalunga, near the Notre-Dame-du-Mont-Carmel chapel.

== Sources ==
- Bashkirtseff, Marie (1999), Lucile Le Roy (ed.), Journal Edition Integrale Sept 26 1877- Dec 21 1879 (in French), L'Age d'Homme, GGKEY:ZB90YT6PRDW
- Cazemajou-Pizzini, Claude (October 2010), "Entre Corse et Continent : Les aléas des premières liaisons maritimes régulières", RHFC Bulletin (in French) (16)
- "Erbalunga, village corse dans le Cap Corse", La Corse Autrement (in French), 17 February 2018
- La compagnie Valéry frères et fils : Armateurs cap corsins (1840-1883) (in French), Università di Corsica Pasquale Paoli, archived from the original on 2018-03-25
- Le Bonaparte 1847 (in French), Musee Ciotaden, archived from the original on 2018-03-25
- Le Gallais, Stéphan (17 October 2015), Épave du Comte Joseph Valery -6m le 17-10-2015 (in French)
- Monti, Charles (24 October 2015), Les épaves de la compagnie Valery entre Corse et Continent (in French), corsenetinfos
- Pellegrinetti, Jean-Paul (2015), "Notables et réseaux politiques en Corse, XIXe- XXe siècle. L'exemple d'Emmanuel Arène (1856–1908)", Histoire@Politique (in French), 1 (25), Centre d'histoire de Sciences Po: 24ff, doi:10.3917/hp.025.0024
- Phocée, Sergio De; Laheyne, Daniel (1 November 2014), "Valéry Frères & Fils", The Wrecksite
- Phocée, Sergio de; Laheyne, Daniel (1 November 2014b), "Morelli F. et Cie.", Wrechsite
- Pierfit, "Joseph VALÉRY comte", Geneanet (in French)
- Pierfit (b), Barthélémy VALÉRY
- Pietrasanta, Marc’Aureliu (21 June 2012), "À VOILE ET A VAPEUR", Journal de la Corse (in French)
- Renussi, Jacques (28 August 2009), "La saga de la compagnie Valery" (PDF), Corse Hebdo (in French)
- Robert, Adolphe; Cougny, Gaston (1889–1891), "VALERY (JEAN.JOSEPH, COMTE)", in Edgar Bourloton (ed.), Dictionnaire des Parlementaires français (1789–1889) (in French)
- Silvani, Paul (2005), "Le naufrage de la Compagnie Morelli", Corse Matin (in French)
