= Patrice de Corsi =

French magistrate and politician

Senator of Corsica
- In office 22 April 1888 – 13 October 1888
- Preceded by: Hippolyte Carnot
- Succeeded by: François Morelli

Personal details
- Born: 15 September 1824 Talasani, Corsica, France
- Died: 13 October 1888 (aged 64)
- Occupation: Magistrate, politician

Patrice de Corsi (15 September 1824 – 13 October 1888) was a French magistrate and politician.

== Early years ==
Patrice de Corsi was born on 15 September 1824 in Talasani, Corsica. He was among the Corsicans who were active in the Revolution of 1848.

In 1860 Corsi was a young advocate. He was engaged in an electoral campaign in the canton of Pero-Casevecchio, where there had long been a feud between the Corsi and Renucci families. During the evening of 13 June 1860, after dark, Corsi and two friends encountered a group of about 15 supporters of Antoine Renucci. A stone was thrown and Corsi fell unconscious. He revived in time to see one of his friends, Filippi "Prete-Vecchio", being shot dead. At the subsequent trial the wrong man was convicted and served three years of a 20 year sentence before the error was discovered and the true culprit was assigned to the galleys, where he died.

Corsi became a magistrate. In 1869 he was one of the co-founders of the weekly La Revanche with Vincent-Marie Farinole, Louis Tommasi and Léonard Limperani.

== Political career ==
Corsi was elected a general councillor. In the 1876 legislative elections for the Bastia constituency Corsi won 4,367 votes against 8,790 votes for Eugène Rouher, who was proclaimed elected on 25 February 1876. Corsi was president of the general council of Corsica at Bastia in 1888 when he ran for election to the senate. The election was held on 22 April 1888 to replace Hippolyte Carnot, a life senator, who had died. There was no clear winner of the first or second rounds of voting, but de Corsi was elected in the third round by 316 votes out of 719. He sat on the left in the senate, and voted with the left for the new military law. Patrice de Corsi died in office on 13 October 1888 in Paris. He was succeeded by François Morelli (1833–1892), who also died in office.

== Sources ==
- Arène, Emmanuel (5 July 1890), "Une erreur judiciaire", Le Figaro (in French)
- Caporossi, Orsu Ghjuvanni, "Les Parlementaires corses depuis 1789", Cronica di A CORSICA (in French)
- Caporossi (b), Orsu Ghjuvanni, "Répertoire des Personnages", Cronica di A CORSICA (in French)
- de CORSI Patrice (in French), Senat de France
- Hugot (1876), Annales du Sénat et de la Chambre des députés. Débats et documents (in French), Journal Officiel
- Pomponi, Francis; Usciati, Jean-Jacques (2016), "Sampiero Porri (1857-1926) journaliste politique : le parcours atypique d'un " vrai républicain "", Cahiers de la Méditerranée (in French), 92
- Robert, Adolphe; Cougny, Gaston (1889–1891), "CORSI (PATRICE DE)", in Edgar Bourloton (ed.), Dictionnaire des Parlementaires français (1789–1889) (in French)
