= Joseph Marie Piétri =

French lawyer and public servant

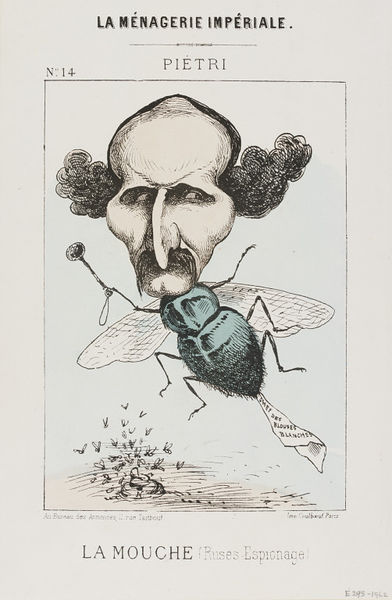
- Caricature of Piétri (c. 1870) by Paul Hadol

Prefect of Police of Paris
- In office 21 February 1866 – 4 September 1870
- Preceded by: Symphorien Boittelle
- Succeeded by: Émile de Kératry

Senator of Corsica
- In office 22 June 1879 – 24 January 1885
- Preceded by: Jean Joseph Valéry
- Succeeded by: Paul de Casabianca; Nicolas Péraldi

Personal details
- Born: 25 February 1820 Sartène, Corsica, France
- Died: 4 January 1902 (aged 81) Sartène, Corsica, France
- Occupation: Lawyer, public servant, politician

Émile Joseph Marie Piétri (25 February 1820 – 4 January 1902), known as Joachim Pietri, was a French lawyer and public servant who was prefect of several departments, a repressive police chief of Paris in the last years of the Second French Empire and Bonapartist Senator of Corsica from 1879 to 1885.

== Early years ==
Joseph Marie Piétri was born in Sartène, Corsica, on 25 February 1820. His parents were Angelo Francesco Pietri (1784–1848) and Giulia Pietri (1786–1853). (Note: The French forms of his parents' names are Ange François Piétri and Julie Marie.) His family was not wealthy. His brother was Pierre-Marie Piétri^{(fr)}, who later became prefect of the police of Paris from January 1852 to January 1858. Piétri studied law in Paris, then practiced as an advocate in Sartène. By ordinance of 31 August 1838 he was appointed justice of the peace in the Corsican canton of Rogliano. He was an enthusiastic supporter of the Revolution of 1848. On 9 August 1848 thanks to the support of his brother he was appointed sub-prefect of Argentan. He then became a supporter of Louis-Napoleon Bonaparte.

On 29 April 1850 Piétri married Palma de Rocca Serra (1830–1885) in Sartène. They had several children including Marinette (c. 1843–1941), Pomponne (1855–1880) and Louis (born 1872). Piétri was appointed sub-prefect of Brest on 9 May 1852. He became Prefect of Ariège on 3 April 1853. He was made an Officer of the Legion of Honour on 3 January 1855 for his dedication during an outbreak of cholera. He became Prefect of Cher on 6 November 1855, Prefect of Hérault on 5 January 1861 and of Prefect of Nord on 12 November 1865. He became known for his administrative qualities and support of the Bonapartist regime.

== Prefect of Police ==
On 21 February 1866 Piétri was appointed Prefect of Police of Paris in place of Symphorien Boittelle. (Note: Boitelle had left the prefecture of Police when he was made senator on 20 February 1866.) He was aged 46. By decree of 19 December 1866 he was made a member of the Imperial Commission of the Exposition Universelle of 1867. On 13 August 1867 he was made a Grand Officer of the Legion of Honour.

Piétri was energetic in repressing unrest. On 2 November 1867 he surrounded Montmartre Cemetery in Paris where 1,500 Republicans had gathered at the grave of the deputy Jean-Baptiste Baudin, who had been killed on a barricade on 4 December 1851 after the coup d'état of 2 December 1851 that brought Napoleon III to power. He also suppressed the demonstration in honour of Charles Augustin Sainte-Beuve, who had defended Ernest Renan in the senate. (Note: Renan's rationalist Life of Jesus was placed on the Index of Prohibited Books by Pope Pius IX on 24 August 1863. Sainte-Beuve wrote in the Constitutionnal that the book simultaneously upset devout believers, radical freethinkers and liberal politicians. He said that Renan, a mixture of artist and chemist, had created a work that breathed new life into the Gospels rather than destroying them.) Piétri did not moderate the violence of his agents, and in December 1867 sent a circular to the police commissioners "to guard against any hesitation or failure." At the same time, he declared that "individual liberty has never been, under any regime, better guaranteed or better respected."

During the general elections of 1869 Piétri took a tough line with men who were hostile to the regime, and in a report to Napoleon on 28 November 1869 attacked powerful men such as Rouher and Persigny. After discovery of the plot that was judged at Blois in 1870 he encouraged the demonstrations on the boulevards of Paris in favour of war with Prussia. A decree of 27 July 1870, which was not published, made him a senator. After the defeat of France at the Battle of Sedan during the Franco-Prussian War he left France hastily on 4 September 1870 and joined Napoleon III in exile.

== Later career ==
In 1872 Piétri applied to the government of Adolphe Thiers for a retirement pension. Although he did not qualify on age or years of service, a decree in April 1873 fixed his pension arrears at 6,000 francs. Léon Renault, the prefect of police, reported in January 1875 that Piétri was one of the most active members of the Bonapartist committee. He became a general councilor of Corsica.

On 22 June 1879 Piétri was elected Senator of Corsica on an imperialist platform by 256 votes against 227 for his opponent, Tomasi. He sat on the right with the Appel au peuple group. He voted against the application of laws to religious congregations, against changes to the judicial oath, against reform of the magistrature and against restoration of divorce. He left office on 24 January 1885. In the general election of 25 January 1885 he failed to be reelected, winning only 212 out of 744 votes. He was defeated by Paul de Casabianca, who won 477 votes. Piétri retired from politics after this. He died on 4 January 1902 in Sartène at the age of 82.

== Sources ==
- Etcheverry, Micaëla, Joseph Marie Pietri (in French)
- Jolly, Jean, ed. (1960), "PIETRI (JOSEPH, MARIE)", dictionnaire des parlementaires français de 1889 à 1940, Presses universitaires de France
- Le Clère, Marcel (2005), "BOITTELLE (Symphorien-Casimir-Joseph)", in Aubouin, Michel; Teyssier, Arnaud; Tulard, Jean (eds.), Histoire et dictionnaire de la police, du Moyen-Age à nos jours (in French), Paris: Robert Laffont, collection Bouquins
- PIETRI Joseph (in French), Sénat de France
- PIETRI (Joseph-Marie, dit Joaquim) (in French), SFHP: Société Française d'Histoire de la Police
- Priest, Robert D. (June 2014), "Reading, Writing, and Religion in Nineteenth-Century France: The Popular Reception of Renan's Life of Jesus", The Journal of Modern History, 86 (2), The University of Chicago Press: 258–294, doi:10.1086/675502, JSTOR 10.1086/675502, S2CID 143554993
- Robert, Adolphe; Cougny, Gaston (1889–1891), "PIÉTRI (JOSEPH-MARIE)", in Edgar Bourloton (ed.), Dictionnaire des Parlementaires français (1789–1889) (in French)
- Robert, Adolphe; Cougny, Gaston (1889–1891b), "CASABIANCA (PIERRE-PAUL DE)", in Edgar Bourloton (ed.), Dictionnaire des Parlementaires français (1789–1889) (in French)
- Wright, Vincent (1979), "Les préfets de police pendant le second empire: personnalités et problèmes.", L' état et sa police en France: 1789–1914 (in French), Librairie Droz, ISBN 978-2-600-03382-4
