= Jacques Hébrard =

French journalist and politician

Senator of French India
- In office 10 January 1882 – 10 January 1891
- Preceded by: Pierre Desbassyns de Richemont
- Succeeded by: Jules Godin

Senator of Corsica
- In office 3 June 1894 – 3 January 1903
- Preceded by: François Pitti-Ferrandi
- Succeeded by: Marius Giacobbi

Personal details
- Born: 21 February 1841 Grisolles, Tarn-et-Garonne, France
- Died: 5 April 1917 (aged 76) Menton, Alpes-Maritimes, France
- Occupation: Journalist, politician

Jacques Hébrard (21 February 1841 – 5 April 1917) was a French journalist and politician. He was Senator for French India from 1882 to 1891, and Senator for Corsica from 1894 to 1903.

== Early years ==
Jacques Hébrard was born in Grisolles, Tarn-et-Garonne, on 21 February 1841. His brother was Adrien Hébrard^{(fr)}. He contributed to the newspaper Le Temps, and became director of this paper.

== Senator ==
Hébrard was elected Senator for French India on 10 January 1882. He ran for election for the Senate after Charles de Freycinet, who had been elected for both the Seine and for French India, chose to represent the Seine. He won by 41 votes against 6 for Edmond About, his sole competitor. He replaced Pierre Desbassyns de Richemont. He held office until 10 January 1891.

Hébrard sat with the left, and consistently voted with the Senate majority. He voted for the policy of the opportunistic ministries, for reform of the magistrature, for divorce, for credits for the Tonkin expedition for exile of the princes, for the new military law and for reestablishment of the district ballot. He voted in favour of prosecution of General Boulanger, and abstained on the draft Lisbonne law restricting freedom of the press. Hébrard failed to be reelected on 11 January 1891, winning 44 votes against his opponent Jules Godin's 46 votes.

Hébrard ran for election as Senator of Corsica on 3 June 1894 in a by-election following the death of François Pitti-Ferrandi. The validity of the election was challenged, but was upheld by the senate of 5 July 1894. He sat with the Republican left. He scarcely participated in the senate debates, apart from two brief interventions on Corsican maritime services and an emergency stock of wheat for Corsica.

== Last years ==
Hébrard did not run for reelection on 4 January 1903. He resumed his career as a journalist, and was also known as an art collector. He retired due to ill health on 1914 and retired to Menton. Jacques Hébrard died in Menton, Alpes-Maritimes, on 5 April 1917.

== Sources ==
- Hebrard Jacques (in French), Senate of France
- Jacques Hébrard (1841-1917) (in French), BnF: Bibliotheque nationale de France
- Jolly, Jean, ed. (1960), "Hébrard (Jacques)", dictionnaire des parlementaires français de 1889 à 1940, Presses universitaires de France
- Liste des anciens sénateurs de la IIIème République par circonscription (in French), Sénat de France
- Robert, Adolphe; Cougny, Gaston (1889–1891), "Hébrard (Jacques)", in Edgar Bourloton (ed.), Dictionnaire des Parlementaires français (1789–1889) (in French)
