= Symphorien Boittelle =

French politician

Symphorien Casimir Joseph Edouard Boitelle
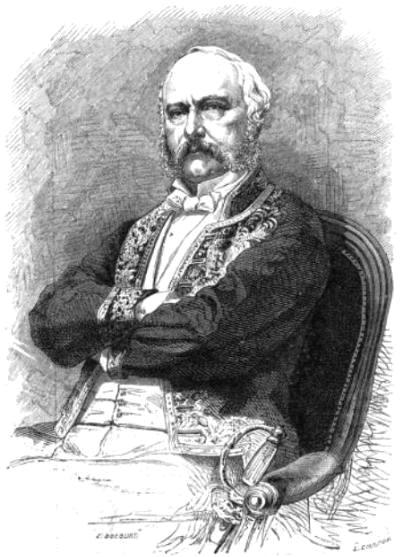
- Boitelle from Le Monde illustré, 3 March 1866

Prefect of Police of Paris
- In office 1858–1866
- Preceded by: Pierre-Marie Piétri
- Succeeded by: Joseph-Marie Piétri

Deputy in the Corps législatif
- In office 15 June 1863 – 1 February 1864

Senator
- In office 20 February 1866 – 4 September 1870

Personal details
- Born: 23 February 1813 Fontaine-Notre-Dame, Nord, France
- Died: 22 November 1897 (aged 84)
- Occupation: Soldier, police chief, politician

Symphorien Casimir Joseph Edouard Boitelle (23 February 1813 – 22 November 1897) was a French soldier, administrator, chief of the Paris police, deputy and senator.

== Early years ==
Symphorien Casimir Joseph Edouard Boitelle was born in Fontaine-Notre-Dame, Nord, on 23 February 1813. His parents were Casimir Joseph Boitelle (Note: According to one source his father was a grocer. Another source says his father was banker, and was Chairman of the Board on the Mines de Vicoigne et Noeux.) (born c. 1783) and Marguerite Huguet (born c. 1787). He entered the École spéciale militaire de Saint-Cyr on 2 December 1833. In 1835 he became a second lieutenant in the 5th Lancers cavalry regiment. On 26 October 1842 he was removed from active duty due to temporary infirmities. On 10 March 1845 he married Amélie Caroline Guillaumine Mina Haussmann (1823–1869). Their children were Olivier (1848–1918), Jules (born 1851) and Gabrielle (born 1853). He resigned from the army in April 1845.

== Administrator ==
On 10 December 1851 Boitelle was appointed sub-prefect of Clamecy, Nièvre, but he did not take up the post. On 1 February 1852 he was appointed sub-prefect of Saint-Quentin. He was made Knight of the Legion of Honour on 1 January 1853. He was appointed Prefect of Aisne on 4 March 1853. He was Prefect of Yonne from 8 September 1856. In the winter of 1856–57 Boitelle and Deluns-Montaud picked a quarrel while at a masked ball, and fought a duel on the Bois de Boulogne while still dressed as Harlequin and Pierrot. Boitelle was run through the chest with a sword, and at first thought to be dead, but recovered. The duel was the subject of paintings and plays. (Note: The best known depiction of the duel, hung at the Palais des Champs-Élysées in the 1857 Salon, is The Duel After the Masquerade by Jean-Léon Gérôme. The account given by Coleman Parsons of the duel as origin for the painting has been questioned by Francis Haskell. Parsons writes that the victor, Deluns-Montaud, was later a deputy. The only deputy by that name was Pierre Deluns-Montaud (1845–1907)^{(fr)}, who would have been too young to fight a duel.)

Boitelle was made Prefect of Police of Paris on 16 March 1858, replacing Pierre Marie Pietri, who had resigned after the attack of Orsini. He was promoted to Officer of the Legion of Honour of 23 August 1858. He was entrusted with general direction of public security by an imperial decree. He was made a grand officer of the Legion of Honour on 14 August 1862. In 1863 Boitelle set up a service to inspect factories and suppress those that were thought to be harming a neighborhood, particularly those where public complaints were made about the smells. In September 1863 Boitelle said he was generally satisfied with relations between the church and the state, which were engaged in a power struggle at the time.

== Political career ==
Boitelle was elected deputy in the Corps législatif as the official candidate for the 7th constituency of Nord in the second round of voting on 15 June 1863. He won 15,429 votes against 14,953 for the opposition candidate, M. Stiévenart-Béthune. The election was cancelled due to serious abuses in favour of Boitelle during the campaign. In a rerun on 6 March 1864 Stiévenart-Béthune won by 16,159 votes against 13,429 for Boitelle.

Boitelle left the prefecture of Police when he was made senator on 20 February 1866. He was succeeded as Prefect of Police by Joseph-Marie Piétri, former prefect of the Nord department. Boitelle held office until the end of the Second French Empire on 4 September 1870. He died at his home in Paris on 22 November 1897. He was buried in the family tomb in the 4th division of the Père Lachaise Cemetery.

== Publications ==
Boitelle edited several reports, including:

- France. Ministère de l'intérieur (1859–1860), Symphorien Boittelle (ed.), Rapports à Son Excellence le Ministre de l'intérieur sur l'émigration années, Paris: Bibliothèque nationale, p. 49
- Symphorien Boittelle, ed. (1861), Rapports à Son Excellence le Ministre de l'intérieur sur l'émigration : années 1859 et 1860 / [signé Boitelle, préfet de police, chargé de la Direction générale de la sûreté publique.], Paris: Impr. impériale, p. 43
- Symphorien Boittelle, ed. (1865), Note adressée à MM. les Président et membres du Conseil de préfecture de la Seine. Affaire Arlot (Département de la Seine. Préfecture de police. 2e division, 4e bureau. Reproduction textuelle pour le jury d'expropriation. - Réponse au Mémoire d'Arlot se défendant contre les accusations d'établissement insalubre concernant sa fabrique de savon par les matières animales aux Prés-Saint-Gervais), Paris: impr. A. Wittersheim, p. 28

== Sources ==
- BOITTELLE Symphor-Casimir-Joseph (in French), Sénat de France
- BOITTELLE Symphorien Casimir (1813-1897) (in French), Amis et Passionnés du Père-Lachaise
- Guillerme, André; Lefort, Anne-Cécile; Jigaudon, Gérard (2004), Dangereux, insalubres et incommodes: paysages industriels en banlieue parisienne, XIXe-XXe siècles (in French), Editions Champ Vallon, ISBN 978-2-87673-409-8
- Garric, Alain, "Symphorien Casimir Joseph BOITTELLE", Geneanet (in French)
- Haskell, Francis (1972), "The sad clown", in Ulrich Finke (ed.), French 19th Century Painting and Literature: with Special Reference to the Relevance of Literary Subject-matter to French Painting, Manchester University Press, ISBN 978-0-7190-0413-1
- Le Clère, Marcel (2005), "BOITTELLE (Symphorien-Casimir-Joseph)", in Aubouin, Michel; Teyssier, Arnaud; Tulard, Jean (eds.), Histoire et dictionnaire de la police, du Moyen-Age à nos jours (in French), Paris: Robert Laffont, collection Bouquins
- M.V. (1866), "M. Boitelle", Le monde illustré: Journal hebdomadaire
- Parsons, Coleman O. (June 1959), "The Wintry Duel: A Victorian Import", Victorian Studies, 2 (4), Indiana University Press: 317–324, JSTOR 3825755
- Price, Roger (2017-11-11), The Church and the State in France, 1789-1870: 'Fear of God is the Basis of Social Order', Springer International Publishing, ISBN 978-3-319-63269-8
- Robert, Adolphe; Cougny, Gaston (1889–1891), "BOITTELLE (SYMPHORIEN-CASIMIR-JOSEPH)", in Edgar Bourloton (ed.), Dictionnaire des Parlementaires français (1789–1889) (in French)
- Symphorien Casimir Joseph Edouard Boittelle (1813-1897) (in French), BnF: Bibliotheque nationale de France
