= Pierre Desbassyns de Richemont =

French archaeologist, historian and politician

Pierre-Philippe-Alexandre Panon Desbassyns de Richemont
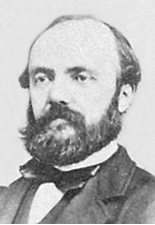

Deputy for French India
- In office 28 May 1871 – 1876

Senator for French India
- In office 26 March 1876 – 7 January 1882
- Succeeded by: Jacques Hebrard

Personal details
- Born: 29 January 1833 Paris, France
- Died: 11 November 1912 (aged 79) Paris, France
- Occupation: Archaeologist, historian and politician

Pierre-Philippe-Alexandre Panon Desbassyns de Richemont (Note: His family name is also given as Panon des Bassyns de Richemont, Panon Desbassayns, etc.) (29 January 1833 – 11 November 1912) was a French archaeologist, historian and politician. Between 1871 and 1882 he represented French India first in the National Assembly and then in the Senate.

== Birth and family ==
Pierre Desbassyns de Richemont was born on 29 January 1833 in Paris. He was descended from Augustin Panon (1664–1749), a carpenter who was born in Toulon and emigrated to Réunion in 1689. Augustin's son was Augustin Panon (Réunion: 1694–1772), a member of the Pondicherry high council. His son was Henri-Paulin Panon Desbassayns (Réunion: 1732–1800), a planter, captain in the Indies battalion, knight of the Order of Saint Louis and husband of Ombline Desbassayns. Henri's son was Pierre's grandfather, Philippe Panon Desbassayns de Richemont, first count of Richemont (Réunion: 1774–1840), an administrator of the Indies and Deputy of the Meuse. Pierre's parents were Eugène Panon Desbassayns de Richemont, comte de Richemont (1800–1859) and Athénaïs Claire Joséphine Grâce Dupont de l'Etang (1809–1848). His father, born in Paris, was Governor of the Comptoirs des Indes.

== Life ==
Pierre Desbassyns de Richemont married Marie Charlotte Victoire Tissot de la Barre de Mérona (1837–1926) on 27 April 1855 in Paris. His wife was the granddaughter of Jean-Baptiste de Nompère de Champagny, Duc de Cadore, a Minister of Napoleon. Their children were Marie Panon Desbassayns de Richemont (1857–1917), Romuald Eugène Octave Alain Marie Panon Desbassayns de Richemont (1860–1945) and Marie-Madeleine Pauline Alice Humbline Pia Panon Desbassayns de Richemont (1862–1925). He was made an officer of the Legion of Honour on 13 August 1860. He occupied himself with archaeological and historical studies, and is known for his Archéologie chrétienne primitive (1870).

On 28 May 1871 Desbassyns de Richemont was elected representative of the French Indies in the National Assembly by 13,957 votes out of 29,606. He sat with the center right. He voted for the peace treaty with Prussia, for public prayers, for abrogation of the laws of exile, for the constituent powers of the Assembly, for acceptance of the resignation of Adolphe Thiers and against the constitutional laws.

On 26 March 1876 Desbassyns de Richemont was unanimously elected Senator for the French Indies, and took his place on the right. He voted for the dissolution of the chamber in 1877 demanded by the cabinet of Broglie and Fourtou, and consistently opposed the republican ministries. He left office on 7 January 1882. He was defeated in the senate election by Charles de Freycinet. (Note: Freycinet was also elected Senator for the Seine, and chose that seat over the Indies. In the by-election of 30 April 1882 Jacques Hébrard was elected Senator for the Indies.) After leaving office he returned to his former life in aristocratic society and to his study of archaeology. He died on 11 November 1912 in Paris.

== Publications ==
Publications by Desbassyns de Richemont included:

- Alexandre Desbassayns de Richemont (1860), Un mot d'un laïque sur la brochure "Le Pape et le Congrès", Paris: J. Lecoffre, p. 24
- Alexandre Desbassayns de Richemont (1 September 1864), De l'Activité intellectuelle dans la société chrétienne (discours prononcé à l'assemblée générale des catholiques à Malines), Paris: C. Douniol, p. 16
- Alexandre Desbassayns de Richemont (1867), La Nouvelle Genève (Extrait du "Correspondant"), Paris: C. Douniol, p. 67
- Alexandre Desbassayns de Richemont (1869), Le Cimetière de Calliste devant l'histoire (Extrait de la Revue des questions historiques), Paris: V. Palmé, p. 145
- Alexandre Desbassayns de Richemont (1870), Archéologie chrétienne primitive: Les nouvelles études sur les catacombes romaines, Précédées d'une lettre par M. le chevalier de Rossi, Paris: Poussielgue, p. 507
- Alexandre Desbassayns de Richemont (27 July 1874), Rapport fait au nom de la commission chargée d'examiner le projet de loi portant approbation de la convention de poste entre la France et le Brésil, conclue le 30 avril 1874, Versailles: impr. de Cerf et fils / Assemblée nationale, p. 18
- Alexandre Desbassayns de Richemont (14 November 1875), Discours ... Discussion de la loi électorale, art. 21; amendement de M. de Champvallier (Extrait du "Journal officiel", du 14 novembre 1875), Paris: A. Wittersheim / Assemblée nationale, p. 63
- Alexandre Desbassayns de Richemont (21 November 1880), Discours ... Première délibération de la proposition de loi relative à l'enseignement secondaire des jeunes filles (Extrait du "Journal officiel" du 21 novembre 1880), Paris: A. Wittersheim / Sénat, p. 63

== Sources ==
- Alexandre Desbassayns de Richemont (1833–1912) (in French), BnF: Bibliotheque nationale de France
- Desbassyns de Richemont Pierre (in French), Senat de France
- Jolly, Jean, ed. (1960), "RICHEMONT (PIERRE, PHILIPPE, Alexandre PANON, vicomte DESBASSYNS de)", dictionnaire des parlementaires français de 1889 à 1940, Presses universitaires de France
- Neuville, Emmanuel, "Alexandre Pierre Philippe Panon Desbassayns de Richemont", geneanet (in French)
- Robert, Adolphe; Cougny, Gaston (1889–1891), "DESBASSYNS DE RICHEMONT (PIERRE-PHILIPPE-ALEXANDRE PANON, VICOMTE)", in Edgar Bourloton (ed.), Dictionnaire des Parlementaires français (1789–1889) (in French)
- Robert, Adolphe; Cougny, Gaston (1889–1891b), "HÉBRARD (JACQUES)", in Edgar Bourloton (ed.), Dictionnaire des Parlementaires français (1789–1889) (in French)
