= Paul de Casabianca =

French lawyer and Republican politician

Pierre-Paul de Casabianca
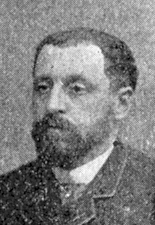
- Casabianca around 1885

Senator of Corsica
- In office 25 January 1885 – 3 January 1903
- Preceded by: Joseph Marie Piétri
- Succeeded by: Arthur Ranc

Personal details
- Born: 13 September 1839 Bastia, Corsica, France
- Died: 12 March 1916 (aged 76) Bastia, Corsica, France
- Occupation: Lawyer, politician

Pierre-Paul de Casabianca (13 September 1839 – 12 March 1916) was a French lawyer and Republican politician who was Senator of Corsica from 1885 to 1903.

== Early years (1839–85) ==
Pierre-Paul de Casabianca was born in Bastia, Corsica, on 13 September 1839. He was the brother of Joseph Luce de Casabianca^{(fr)}. He became a lawyer. On 21 August 1881 he ran for election to the chamber of deputies as a Republican candidate and gained 6,533 votes against 7,406 for the Bonapartist candidate Denis Gavini, who was elected. Casabianca was among the leaders of the Opportunist Republicans who supported Emmanuel Arène in his successful bid in the legislative by-election for the Corte constituency in 1881.

The Casabianca family was influential in the north of Corsica. During the reform of the judicial organization, in August 1883 Casabianca's father became president of the Bastia Court of Appeal with two of his cousins as advisers. The presidents of the courts of Corte and Bastia were both cousins of Casabianca, who was president of the Corsican general council from 1883 to 1885. In the case of the railway from Ajaccio to Bastia the jurors who reviewed the expropriations were appointed by the general council, and Casabianca presented the case as lawyer for the railway company.

== Senator (1885–1903) ==
On 25 January 1885 Casabianca was elected Senator of Corsica by 477 out of 744 votes. He defeated the Bonapartist Joseph Marie Piétri, who won only 212 votes. He sat with the moderate left. Casabianca led the branch of the Corsican Republican party that rejected the former Bonapartist party and Arène's more extreme Republican group. In the mid-1880s he was the main republican leader, while Arène was still only his lieutenant and not yet "King of Corsica." He supported the successive ministries. In the last session he voted for reinstatement of the single-member ballot, for the draft Lisbonne law restricting freedom of the press, and abstained from voting on the case of General Boulanger.

In 1893 the Gavini and Casabianca families met in Vichy and made a pact to unite and seize political power from Arène and eliminate him from departmental decision making. However, by 1895 Arène was again the undisputed master of Corsican politics. Casabianca was reelected on 7 January 1894 in the first round by 434 out of 747 votes. In the elections of 4 January 1903 he was defeated by Émile Combes. In a by-election on 15 February 1903 Arthur Ranc was elected Senator for Corsica in place of Émile Combes, who had also been elected for Charente-Inférieure, which he had chosen to represent.

== Last years (1903–16) ==
After losing his senate seat Casabianca renounced politics. Although formerly president of the Corsican general council, he did not run in the 1910 cantonal elections. However, he agreed to run for election to the senate on 7 January 1912 on his party's list against that of Paul Doumer, but was defeated. He was elected to the general council for Vescovato. He ran in the legislative elections on 26 April 1914, but retired after being beaten in the first round by Henri Pierangeli^{(fr)}. Casabianca died in Bastia on 12 March 1916 at the age of 77.

== Sources ==
- CASABIANCA (de) Paul (in French), Sénat de France
- Jolly, Jean, ed. (1960), "CASABIANCA (PIERRE, PAUL DE)", dictionnaire des parlementaires français de 1889 à 1940, Presses universitaires de France
- Jolly, Jean, ed. (1960b), "RANC (ARTHUR)", dictionnaire des parlementaires français de 1889 à 1940, Presses universitaires de France
- Pellegrinetti, Jean-Paul (2015), "Notables et réseaux politiques en Corse, XIXe - XXe siècle. L'exemple d'Emmanuel Arène (1856-1908)", Histoire@Politique (in French), 1 (25): 24, doi:10.3917/hp.025.0024
- Pomponi, Francis; Usciati, Jean-Jacques (2016), "Sampiero Porri (1857-1926) journaliste politique : le parcours atypique d'un « vrai républicain", Cahiers de la Méditerranée (in French), 92: 133–165, doi:10.4000/cdlm.8342
- Robert, Adolphe; Cougny, Gaston (1889–1891), "CASABIANCA (PIERRE-PAUL DE)", in Edgar Bourloton (ed.), Dictionnaire des Parlementaires français (1789–1889) (in French)
- Robert, Adolphe; Cougny, Gaston (1889–1891b), "PIÉTRI (JOSEPH-MARIE)", in Edgar Bourloton (ed.), Dictionnaire des Parlementaires français (1789–1889) (in French)
