= Jean Filippi =

French politician

Jean Filippi (5 October 1905 – 15 January 1993) was a French politician. Born in Geneva, Switzerland, to a French diplomat, he belonged to the Radical Party (France).

From 1930 onwards Filippi worked as a finance inspector for the Inspectorate General of Finances. Filippi then worked as the secretary of SNCF, the French national railway. In March 1940 Filippi became chief of cabinet to Yves Bouthillier, the Minister of Finance, a position he remained in following the defeat of France at the hands of Germany and into the period of the Vichy Government. In July 1941, he was appointed as the secretary-general of economic affairs, and in 1942 returned to head SNCF until September 1944. Filippi avoided being purged as a collaborator as he was able to show that when working with SNCF he had helped the French resistance. In December 1944 he was hired to work in General Koeltz's Military Mission for German Affairs and took part in the administration of French-occupied Germany.

Between 1956 and 1957, he was France's minister of Budget. From 1955 until 1980, he was a Senator of Corsica. When Lyndon Johnson claimed that Napoleon Bonaparte was Italian, Filippi criticised this saying that “It's a stupidity,” and said that Bonaparte "had the same right to be called a Frenchman as I have."
