= Emmanuel Arène =

French journalist, playwright and republican politician

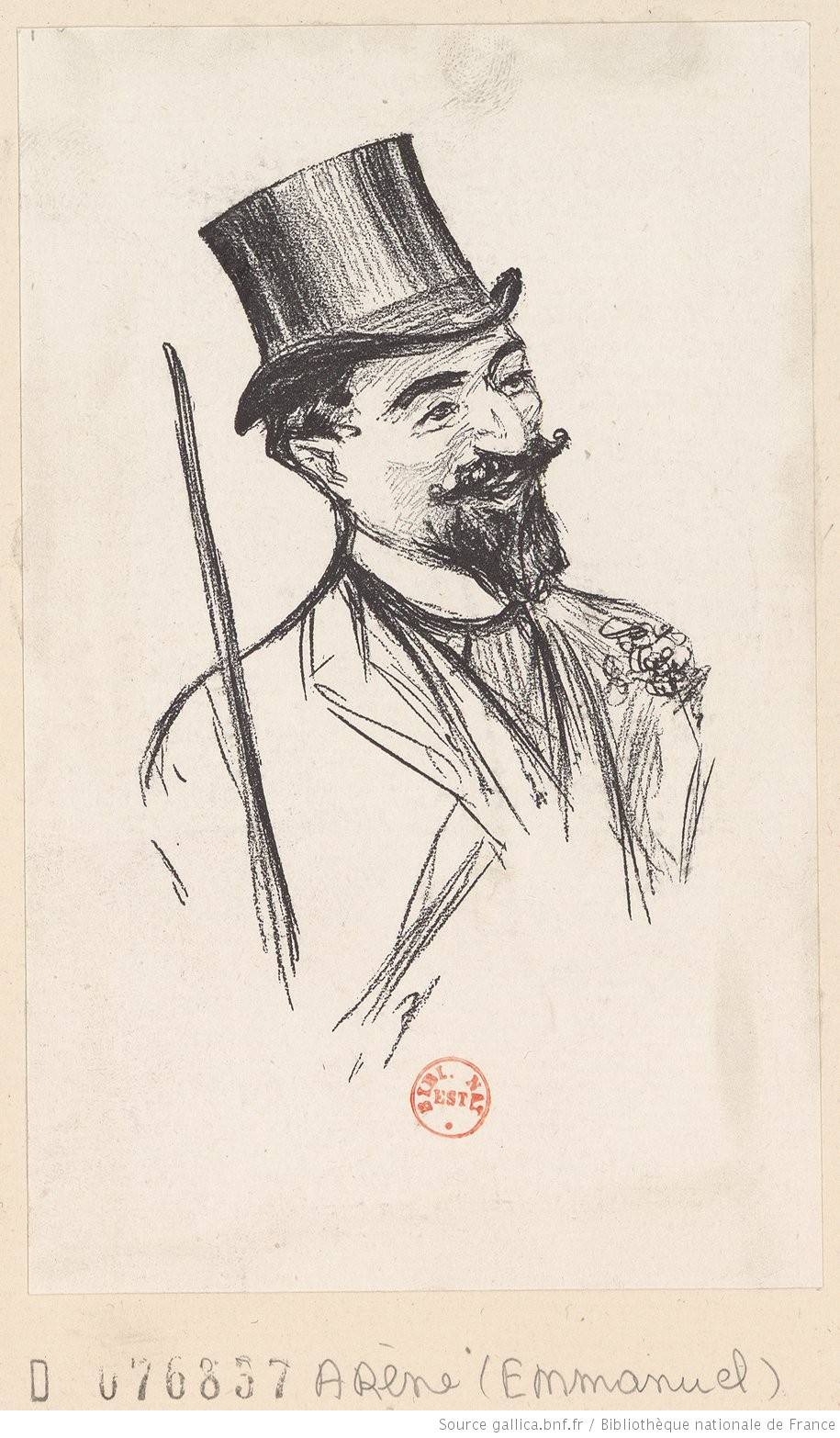

Deputy of Corsica
- In office 4 December 1881 – 14 October 1885

Deputy of Corsica
- In office 14 February 1886 – 3 November 1904
- Succeeded by: Dominique Forcioli

Senator of Corsica
- In office 18 September 1904 – 15 August 1908 (died)
- Preceded by: Ange Muracciole
- Succeeded by: Thadée Gabrielli; Nicolas Péraldi

Personal details
- Born: 1 January 1856 Ajaccio, Corsica, France
- Died: 14 August 1908 (aged 52) Le Fayet, Saint-Gervais-les-Bains, Haute-Savoie, France
- Occupation: French journalist, playwright and politician

Emmanuel Arène (1 January 1856 – 14 August 1908) was a French journalist, playwright and republican politician who was deputy for Corsica for many years and senator of Corsica in his last years. He was involved in scandals over maritime mail contracts and the Panama Canal funding. Towards the end of his career he dominated Corsican politics. Arène was also a prolific and successful journalist, wrote short stories and wrote for the theatre.

== Background ==
After the fall of the Emperor Napoleon III in 1870 the island of Corsica was a Bonapartist stronghold for the next ten years. New political players from the middle-classes appeared from 1880 onward, mostly foreign to the idea of dynasties. Instead they based their legitimacy on their education, professional success and ability to get things done by pulling together political, administrative and business networks. Arène emerged as one of the most prominent of these new men, leader of the island's Republicans by 1885 and the dominant political power in Corsica at the time of his death in 1908.

== Early years ==
Emmanuel Arène was born in Ajaccio, Corsica, on 1 January 1856. He was the fifth of six children of Joseph Arène, a merchant, and Jeanne-Paule Forcioli, a shopkeeper. His grandfather, Louis Arène, was an innkeeper from Solliès-Pont, Var, who had settled in Ajaccio in 1757 and prospered. The family had soon integrated into the local community through marriages with the Campi and Forcioli families of the old Ajaccian bourgeoisie. Emmanuel's father was a prosperous merchant who achieved considerable social prominence. His funeral was attended by the consuls of England, Italy and Denmark and several high officials of the Corsican administration.

Despite growing up in a conventionally Bonapartist milieu, Arène showed Republican sympathies as a young man. After completing his secondary education he enrolled at the University of Aix-en-Provence, but failed after his first year. He then went to Paris, determined to study more seriously than in Aix. His goal was to qualify as a lawyer. He became a habitual reader of the Le XIXe siècle, a journal directed by Edmond About, a Republican journalist and writer, and anti-clerical Freemason who was close to Léon Gambetta. In September 1875 a letter by Arène was published in the paper responding to an article on the intolerance of Corsicans by Francisque Sarcey. About met Arène, was impressed by his spirit, political convictions and writing ability, and gave him a job as a correspondent for Le XIXe siècle. Arène left the university and joined the circle of the Parisian Opportunist Republicans. After leaving Le XIXe Siècle he moved on to the journal Paris, which had been founded by former editors of La France.

In several lively controversies Arène was a strong supporter of Gambetta. In 1879 he accepted the position of chief of the special secretariat of the Minister of the Interior and Religion, Charles Lepère^{(fr)}, and continued with Lepère's successor Ernest Constans until November 1881. Gambetta supported Arène's election to the general council of Corsica in August 1880, despite the fact that technically he was ineligible since he was not yet 25 years old. He defeated the deputy and incumbent Charles Abbatucci. Since he was under 25, the election was annulled, but in March 1881 he was again elected against Abbatucci. Arène was General Councilor continuously from 1880 until 1908, first in the canton of Zicavo (1881–1886), then San-Lorenzo (1888–1903) and finally Santa-Maria-Siché (1903–1908). He was president of the Departmental Assembly from 1888 to 1893, in 1896, and then from 1900 to 1908.

== Deputy ==
=== 3rd legislature (1881–85) ===
Gambetta supported Arène in his election as deputy for the district of Corte on 4 December 1881 in a by-election after Horace de Choiseul-Praslin^{(fr)} had chosen to represent Melun in Seine-et-Marne. Arène won with 6,672 votes out of 9,389 against the radical republican Paschal Grousset, a former member of the Paris Commune. Arène sat with the Republican Union group and voted for the opportunist policy of the governments of Gambetta and Jules Ferry. He supported the "grand ministry" in his articles in the press. On 26 January 1882 he was with the Gambetta minority, and was very cool to the cabinet of Charles de Freycinet. He voted against the Jules Roche amendment on election of the mayor of Paris, against the proposal of Charles Boysset^{(fr)} to abolish the Concordat of 1801 and against elections of magistrates by the people. He spoke in the chamber on 12 July 1882 as rapporteur on the project for maritime postal services between continental France and Corsica.

Arène was a strong supporter of Jules Ferry, who became prime minister on 22 February 1883 and backed him over the Tonkin expedition although he abstained from voting to fund it. He voted for maintaining the embassy in the Holy See, for suppression of life senators and for the proposal by Jean Antoine Ernest Constans to reinstate voting for lists. As a contributor to Le Matin, in August 1884 Arène had a violent dispute with the deputy Félix Granet^{(fr)} and Ernest Judet, director and editor in chief of the Presse Libre. Previously Judet had accused Arène and his friend, the senator Nicolas Péraldi, of being biased in favour of François Morelli's shipping company, which had the concession for maritime postal services between the continent and Corsica. Arène accused Judet of "indelicacy or theft" when an issue of the Presse Libre reproduced a dispatch from Bastia to Arène. They fought a duel in which Arène was wounded in the hand. Arène was a friend of the prefect André de Trémontels, and was involved in the affair of the journalist Saint-Elme, whose death was attributed to Trémontels.

=== 4th legislature (1886–89) ===
Arène ran for reelection as republican candidate for Deputy of Corsica, but won only 24,625 votes against 24,953 for the last elected member on the conservative list, François de Montera^{(fr)}. The election was invalidated, and in a rerun on 14 February 1886 Arène was elected with 25,948 votes out of 49,382. In the new legislature he registered with the Union of the Left and continued to support moderate republicans and. He voted for the Rouvier and Tirard ministries in the sessions of 19 November 1887 and 30 March 1888.

Arène was made president of the general council of Corsica in 1888. He used his position in the power structure to give out public and private jobs, exemptions, favors and credits, mostly to his family and his allies. On 11 February 1889 he voted in favour of reinstatement of the universal ballot. On 14 February 1889 he abstained from the vote to adjourn revision of the constitutional laws. He was appointed rapporteur of the commission to consider prosecution of the three deputies who belonged to the Ligue des Patriotes, and was unusually vocal in this role. On 4 April 1889 he voted in favour of prosecution of General Boulanger.

=== 5th and 6th legislature (1889–98) ===
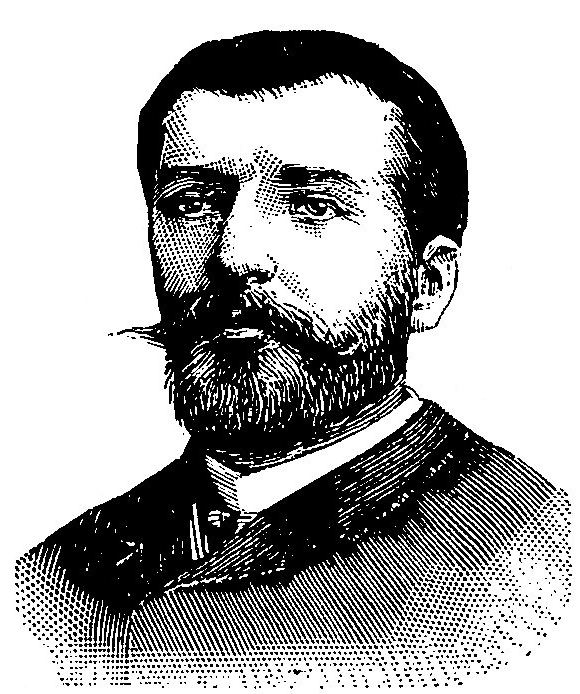
Arène in 1892 during the Panama affair

In the general elections of 22 September 1889 Arène was reelected deputy of Sartène (Corsica) in the first round by 4,090 votes against 2,965 for the Bonapartist candidate Abbatucci. He registered with the Republican group. In this legislature he was active in the debates over the budget of the ministries of Agriculture and the Interior. He asked for a phased increase of the tax for Corsica and for completion of the railway line from Vizzavona to Corte. He was named in the Panama Affair, but was reelected in the first round in the 20 August 1893 general elections. He was finally acquitted from the Panama scandal in 1893. In his electoral campaign in 1893 he proclaimed,

I know only one family, where birthright is nothing and where the right of conquest is everything, where a person is judged according to his own acts and not according to those of his fathers, where he must make his name himself instead of receiving everything ready made, where education is superior to nobility and intelligence to fortune. This family is the Republican party: I was born there, I grew up there, I fought there, I suffered there and I will die there. It is to support it against all avowed or hidden enemies, it is to strengthen it against all assaults, to defend it against all coalitions that I invite you all to cry "Long live Corsica! Long live the Republic!"

Arène married Laure Orenga on 20 August 1894 in Bastia, daughter of Étienne-Louis Orenga, a trader, president of the commercial court and vice-president of the chamber of commerce. He began to write for Le Figaro in 1895. In 1896 the newspaper La France published a list of 104 parliamentarians including Arène who had allegedly received funds from the Panama company. To confirm his mandate Arène chose to run as deputy for Ajaccio in the 7 November 1897 by-election caused by the death of Dominique François Ceccaldi^{(fr)}, and was returned by 8,941 votes to 1,008 for his opponent. The Chamber did not rule on the validity of this election, but his position as deputy was now unassailable.

During the Dreyfus affair, on 12 November 1897 Arène agreed with Auguste Scheurer-Kestner, Mathieu Dreyfus, Louis Leblois^{(fr)} and Edgar Demange to launch a campaign to sway public opinion in favour of a revision of the verdict against Dreyfus. Arène wrote an article in Le Figaro on 14 November 1897 under the pseudonym "Vidi" on "Le dossier de M. Scheurer-Kestner". It revealed that Alfred Dreyfus had not written the bordereau, which could not be attributed to him. The real traitor, who was not named, was described as "an officer, who is quite well-known in Paris ... married ... well-connected ... not attached to the Ministry of War but to a garrison near Paris". The article also stated that a "new document", the faux Henry, that cited the name of Dreyfus and had been mentioned by General Jean-Baptiste Billot to Scheurer-Kestner, was a forgery.

=== 7th and 8th legislatures (1898–1904) ===
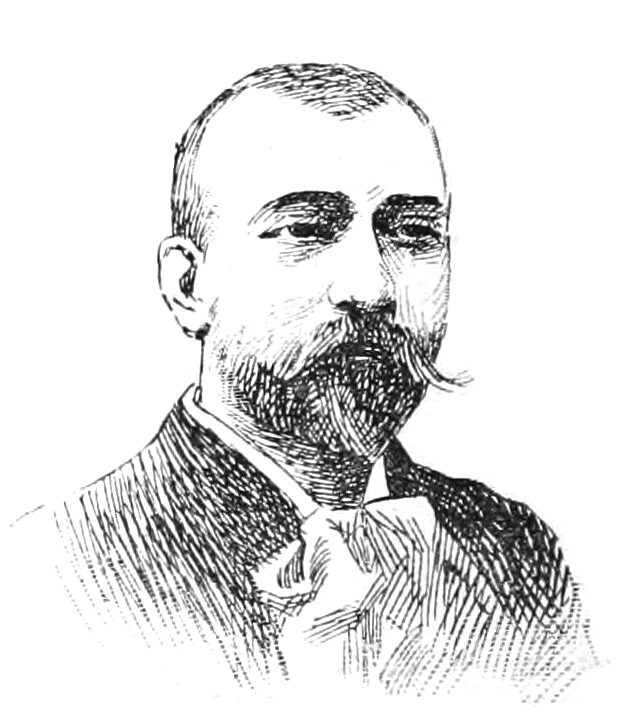
Arène in 1898

In the 8 May 1898 general elections Arène was reelected deputy of Ajaccio by 8,437 votes against 2,464 for his main opponent.

In the early spring of 1899 the young Corsican Joseph Marie François Spoturno, whose family knew Arène's mother Jeanne Forcioli, arrived in Paris where Arène gave him a job as an unpaid assistant. Arène introduced Spoturno, later better known as François Coty, to politicians and officials, and to his wide circle of acquaintances in Parisian society. On one occasion Arène challenged the journalist Arthur Meyer to a duel for saying the deputies from Corsica were bandits. Spoturno accompanied Arène to the dawn rendezvous in the Bois de Boulogne, where both men fired and missed, satisfying honour. Spoturno became interested in selling perfume. Arène encouraged him in this venture, and advised him to conceal his Corsican origins by taking his mother's name Coti and spelling it as Coty. This was the origin of the beauty products company Coty, Inc.

In the general elections of 27 April 1902 Arène was reelected by 10,084 against 606 for his main opponent. In his last two legislatures he devoted himself to defending the economic interests of Corsica, where he dominated politics. On 4 January 1903 he orchestrated the election of Émile Combes as senator despite his unpopular positions on religion and the Dreyfus affair. When Combes chose instead to represent Charente-Inferieure, where he had also been elected, Arène supported Arthur Ranc, who was elected to the senate on 15 February 1903.

== Last years ==
After Senator Ange Muracciole died on 2 July 1904, Arène ran in the resulting by-election on 18 September 1904 and was elected to the senate by 767 votes out of 784. He held office until his death. Emmanuel Arène died in Le Fayet, Saint-Gervais-les-Bains, Haute-Savoie, on 14 August 1908 at the age of 52. His only son Jean-Louis was 12 years old when he died, and did not follow him into politics.

== Publications ==
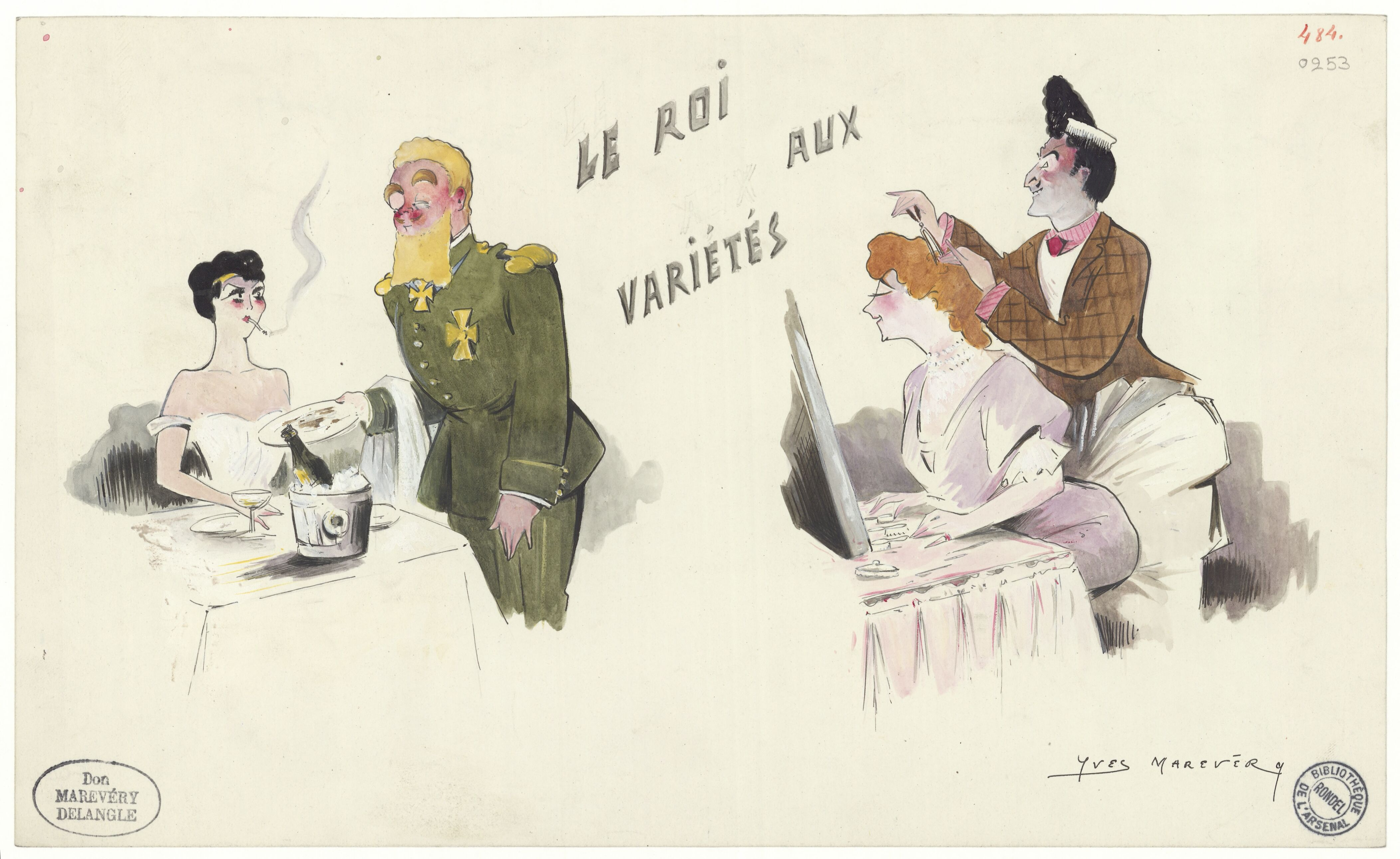
Poster for Le Roi (1908)

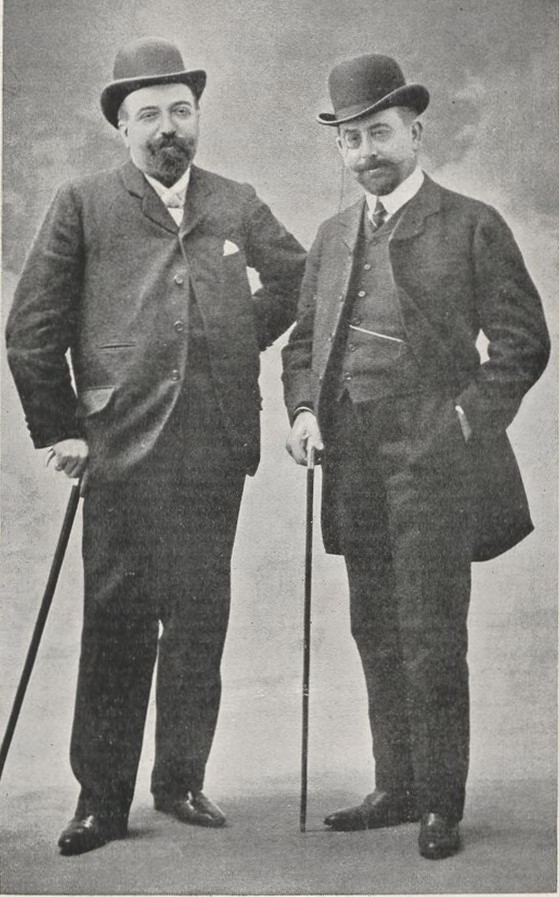
Emmanuel Arène and Alfred Capus

Arène was a journalist throughout his political career, and his many articles were extremely popular, particularly those written for Le Matin. He also wrote for Le XIXe siècle, Le Voltaire, Le Paris, Le Gil Blas, L’Éclair, Le Figaro, L’Union républicaine, La Corse républicaine and Le Journal de la Corse. He had a brilliant style, tinged with irony and sometimes gently malicious. Until his death he wrote the dramatic column of Le Figaro with an indulgent and facetious style. He published a collection of short stories in 1887, Le dernier bandit. Arene became well known as an author for L'Adversaire, co-authored with Alfred Capus. He later collaborated with Robert de Flers and Gaston Arman de Caillavet on Le Roi (The King).

Various speeches, proposals and reports by Arène were published by the National Assembly. Other publications by Arène include:

- Emmanuel Arène (1896), Le Dernier bandit (Extr. de la lecture, 25 mars 1896), pp. 581–602
- Emmanuel Arène; Alfred Capus (1904), L'adversaire (comédie en 4 actes: "L'Illustration". Supplément au n° 3177, 16 janvier 1904), Paris: impr. de "L'Illustration", p. 30
- Emmanuel Arène; Francis de Croisset (1907), Paris-New York (pièce en 3 actes), p. 80
- Emmanuel Arène; Gaston-Arman de Caillavet; Robert de Flers (1908), Le roi (comédie en quatre actes), Paris: Librairie théâtrale, p. 247
- Emmanuel Arène; Georges Montorgueil (1910), Léone, drame lyrique en 4 actes, poème de Georges Montorgueil, d'après la nouvelle d' Emmanuel Arène (Paris, Opéra-Comique, 7 mars 1910), Music by Samuel Rousseau, Paris: Choudens, p. 265
- Emmanuel Arène (1934), Emmanuel Arène. Contes et Nouvelles, Préface de Henri Pierangeli, Paris: Chanth, p. 309

== Sources ==
- Emmanuel Arène (in French), Assemblée nationale
- Emmanuel Arène (1856–1908), BnF: Bibliotheque nationale de France
- Jolly, Jean (1960), "ARENE (EMMANUEL)", Dictionnaire des parlementaires français (1889–1940) (in French), Presses Universitaires de France
- Pasquale, Jean-Claude Di (2007), "Emmanuel Arène", Les fils de la liberté: les fils de Pasquale Paoli (in French), Edilivre, ISBN 978-2-917135-60-0
- Pellegrinetti, Jean-Paul (January–April 2015), "Notables et réseaux politiques en Corse, XIXe - XXe siècle. L'exemple d'Emmanuel Arène (1856-1908)" (PDF), Histoire@Politique (in French), 25 (25), Sciences Po: 24, doi:10.3917/hp.025.0024
- Robert, Adolphe; Cougny, Gaston (1889–1891), "ARENE (EMMANUEL)", in Edgar Bourloton (ed.), Dictionnaire des Parlementaires français (1789–1889) (in French)
- Toledano, Roulhac; Coty, Elizabeth Z. (2009), François Coty: Fragrance, Power, Money, Pelican Publishing, ISBN 978-1-58980-639-9
- Whyte, G. (2005-10-12), The Dreyfus Affair: A Chronological History, Springer, ISBN 978-0-230-58450-1
