= François Peraldi =

- Born: 2 May 1938; Paris, France
- Died: 21 March 1993 (aged 54); Montreal, Quebec, Canada
- Occupation(s): Psychoanalyst, linguist

François Peraldi (May 2, 1938 – March 21, 1993) was a Canadian psychoanalyst and linguist. Peraldi introduced Jacques Lacan's clinical work into North America. He rejected the label Lacanian for himself and preferred to say he was engaged in "Lacanizing." Peraldi established a biweekly Peraldi Seminar for 15 years and established the Réseau des Cartels to help disseminate Lacan's and his group's ideas. He died of AIDS in 1993.

== Life and career ==
Peraldi was studying medicine when he underwent a teaching psychoanalysis at the Paris Psychoanalytic Society. He then completed his training at École Freudienne de Paris. He began working as an institutional psychotherapist with young psychotics. Along with his psychoanalytic training, he completed a doctorate in linguistics with Roland Barthes at the Centre National de la Recherche Scientifique.

In 1974 he emigrated to Montreal with an appointment in the Department of Linguistics of the University of Montreal. His Peraldi seminar, held every other Wednesday from 1976 to 1991 helped create a community of like-minded practitioners. In 1986 Peraldi established the Réseau des Cartels, designed as a way to pass on the learnings of himself and his cohorts without creating an institutionalized system.

He edited the Polysexuality edition of the journal Semiotext(e), which outlines his personal approach to sexuality.

== Selected works ==
- Peraldi, François (1970). The Erotic Body of Language. Texte
- Duncan, C; Peraldi, François (1974). Discourse of the Erotic: The Erotic in the Discourse. Meanjin Quarterly
- Peraldi, François (1978). Pour traduire "Un coup de dés..." Meta: Journal des traducteurs
- Peraldi, François (1978). L'élangage de la Folie. Santé mentale au Québec
- Peraldi, François (1980). Au-delà de la sémiolinguistique. La sémiotique de CS Peirce. Langages Paris
- Eco, Umberto; Peraldi, François (1980). Peirce et la sémantique contemporaine. Langages
- Peraldi, François (1981). La psychanalyse se meurt, la psychanalyse est morte, vive la GRC psychiatrique! Santé mentale au Québec
- Peraldi, François (1981). Why did Peirce terrorize Benveniste? Semiotica
- Peraldi, François (1982). Psychanalyse et traduction. Meta: Journal des traducteurs
- Peraldi, François (1984). Elle, l'Autre. Études freudiennes
- Peraldi, François (1987). The thing for Freud and the Freudian thing. 'American Journal of Psychoanalysis
- Peraldi, François (1988). A Note on Time in The Purloined Letter
- Peraldi, François, Egyed Bela [trans.] (1989). Passing-A-Way-Of-The-Child. in Nietzsche and the Rhetoric of Nihilism: Essays on Interpretation, Language and Politics
- Peraldi, François (1990). Théoriser, c'est pas terroriser ou l'erreur en traduction. Meta: Journal des traducteurs
- Peraldi, François (1990). The Passion of Death. A Free Associative Reading of Freud and Marguerite Duras. L'esprit Createur
- Peraldi, François (1991). The "Great Man" from Vienna to Paris in the Thirties. American Imago
- Peraldi, François (1992). Heterosexual Presumption. American Imago
