= Muracciole =

Muracciole Muraccioli
- Commune
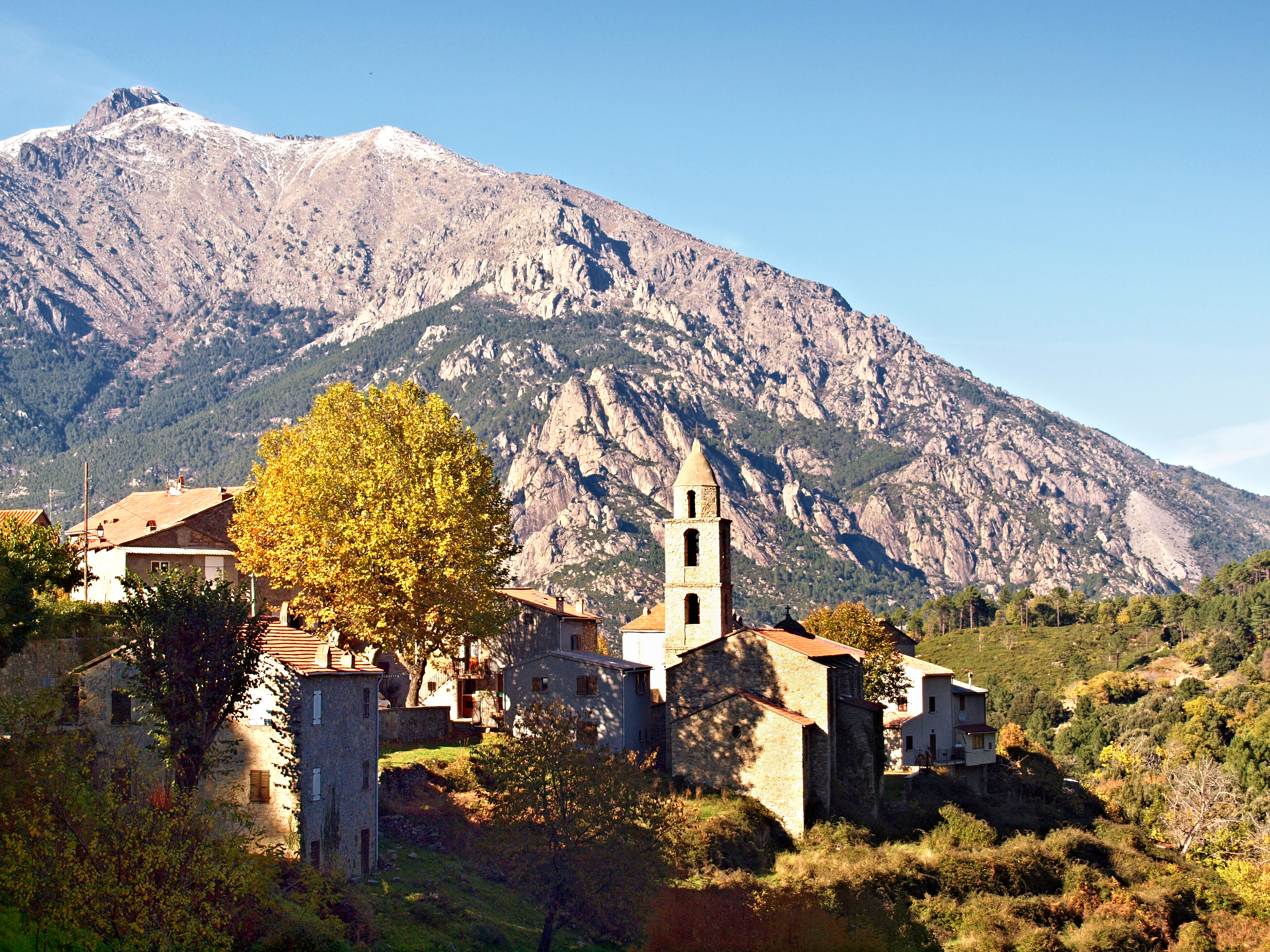
- The village of Muracciole, with Monte Cardo in the background
- Location of Muracciole
- Location within France Location within Corsica
- Coordinates: 42°10′15″N 9°11′05″E
- Country: France
- Region: Corsica
- Department: Haute-Corse
- Arrondissement: Corte
- Canton: Corte
- Intercommunality: Centre Corse

Government
  - Mayor (2020–2026): Chantal Peraldi
- Area^{1}: 14.06 km^{2} (5.43 sq mi)
- Elevation: 630 m (2,070 ft)
- Highest elevation: 1,565 m (5,135 ft)
- Lowest elevation: 379 m (1,243 ft)
- Population (2023): 33
  - Density: 2.3/km^{2} (6.1/sq mi)
- Time zone: UTC+01:00 (CET)
  - Summer (DST): UTC+02:00 (CEST)
- INSEE/Postal code: 2B171 /20219
- ^{1} French Land Register data, which excludes lakes, ponds, glaciers > 1 km^{2} (0.386 sq mi or 247 acres) and river estuaries.

Muracciole (Corsican: Muraccioli) is a commune in the Haute-Corse department of France on the island of Corsica.

== Population ==
Historical population
Year	Pop.	±% p.a.
1968	96	—
1975	87	−1.40%
1982	71	−2.86%
1990	40	−6.92%
1999	38	−0.57%
2007	45	+2.14%
2012	43	−0.91%
2017	34	−4.59%
2023	33	−0.50%
Source: INSEE

== See also ==
- Communes of the Haute-Corse department
- Tour de Corse.
