= Marius Giacobbi =

French politician

Jules Joseph François Marius Giacobbi

Deputy of Corsica
- In office 8 May 1898 – 23 January 1903

Senator of Corsica
- In office 4 January 1903 – 6 January 1912

Deputy of Corsica
- In office 10 May 1914 – 7 December 1919

Personal details
- Born: 14 September 1846 Lugo-de-Venaco (Venaco), Corsica, France
- Died: 11 December 1919 (aged 73) Venaco, Corsica, France
- Occupation: Advocate, politician

Jules Joseph François Marius Giacobbi (14 September 1846 – 11 December 1919) was a French lawyer and politician who was deputy or senator for Corsica from 1898 to 1919.

== Early years (1846–98) ==
Marius Giacobbi was born on 14 September 1846 in Lugo-de-Venaco (Venaco), Corsica. His parents were Giuseppe Maria Giacobbi (1803–1870), an advocate and historian, and Elise Annonciade Angeli (1821–1890). Giacobbi became mayor of Venaco and then general councillor for Venaco. On 25 March 1895 he married Marie Appolonie Stefani (born 1873) in Venaco. Their son Paul Joseph Marie Giacobbi^{(fr)} was born on 18 March 1896 in Venaco. His other children included François Marie Charles Formose de Lugo Giacobbi (born 1897) and Faustine Giacobbi.

== First term as deputy (1898–1903) ==
On 8 May 1898 Giacobbi ran for election as deputy of Corte against the incumbent Luce de Casabianca^{(fr)}. Both were Republican, but Giacobbi was further to the left. He won in the first round by 6,841 votes against 4,781 for Casabianca. The election was contested, but was eventually admitted. Giacobbi sat on the committees for the colonies, navigation and fishing, and in 1899 was a member of the committee on administrative economies. He did not often speak in public. He was reelected on 27 April 1902 by a clear margin.

== Senator (1903–12) ==
Giacobbi ran for election to the Senate in the triennial renewal of 4 January 1903 and was elected by 643 out of 774 voters. He sat with the democratic left. As in the chamber of deputies, he was more active in committees than in debates. He was a member of the committees on the colonies and the navy. He ran for reelection to the senate on 7 January 1912 but was defeated, with only 211 out of 776 votes.

== Second term as deputy (1914–19) ==
On 26 April 1914 Giacobbi again ran for election to the legislature. He obtained 4,258 out of 9,970 votes in the first round, then on 10 May 1914 won 5,773 votes to 4,934 for his opponent Benedetti. In the chamber his main effort was in the navy committee, but he was also a member of the social insurance committee, and after World War I (1914–18) of the committee on liberated regions. He suffered from illness throughout this last legislature and was often forced to take leave from the chamber.

Marius Giacobbi died on 11 December 1919 in his home town of Venaco at the age of 73. Venaco had a mayor named Giacobbi for 120 years from 1878, with an interlude between 1919 and 1922, including Marius, his son, grandson and great-grandson. Marius Giacobbi's son Paul Giacobbi was a minister several times during the French Fourth Republic. Paul's son François Giacobbi was a deputy, senator and under-secretary of state. His son, Paul Giacobbi, was also a deputy until 2017.

== Sources ==
- Angelise, Jules Joseph Francois Marius GIACOBBI (in French)
- Battini, Hélène; Vinciguerra, Patrick (21 February 2017), Paul Giacobbi : "et maintenant, que vais-je faire ?", France Bleu RCFM
- Billard, Martine (4 December 2017), Corse : comme ailleurs, la référence à la gauche n'est plus efficiente (in French)
- Jolly, Jean, ed. (1960), "GIACOBBI (JULES, JOSEPH, FRANÇOIS, Marius)", dictionnaire des parlementaires français de 1889 à 1940, Presses universitaires de France
- Marius Giacobbi (in French), Assemblée nationale
- "Paul Joseph Marie Giacobbi", Les Français Libres (in French)
