= Arthur Ranc =

French politician and journalist

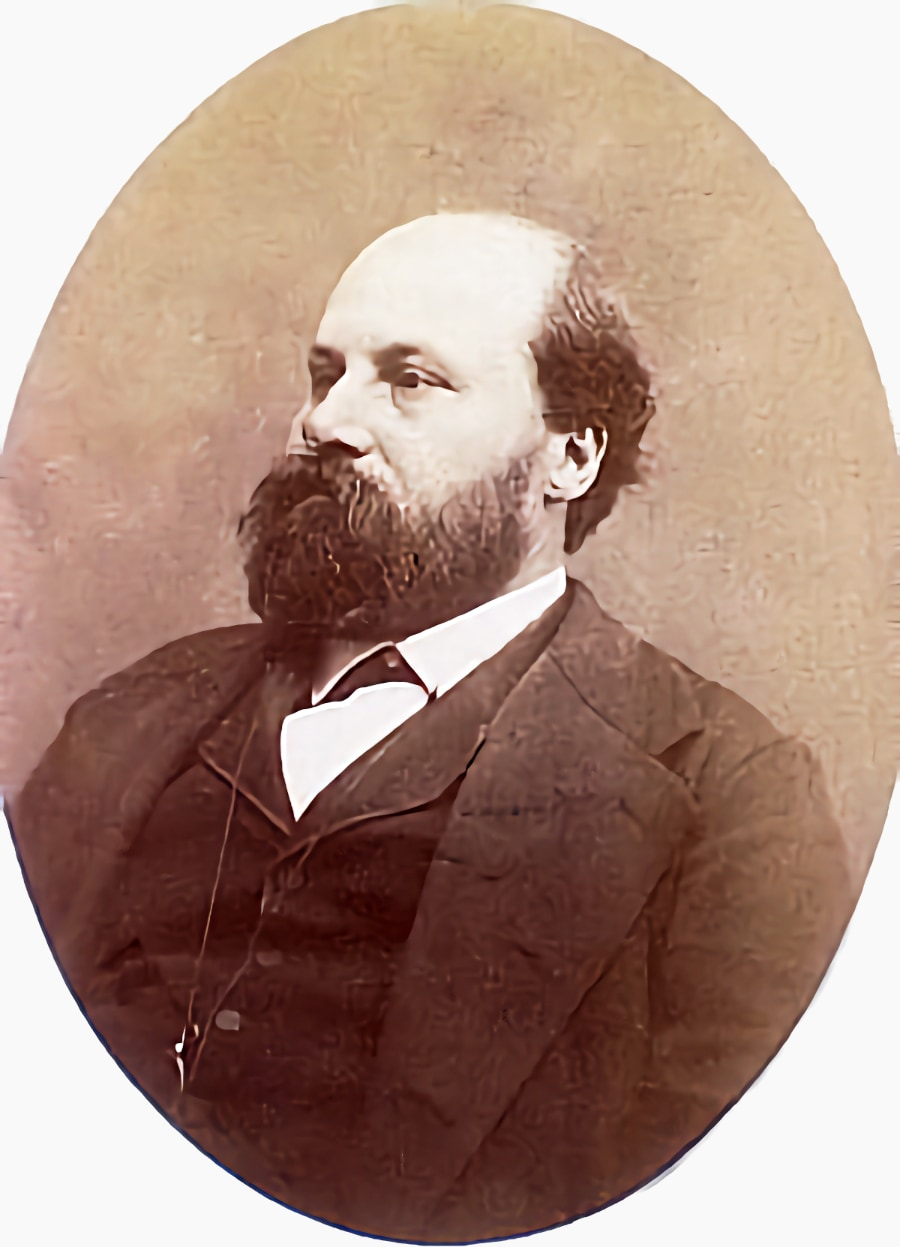
Arthur Ranc

Arthur Ranc (20 December 1831 – 10 August 1908) was a French left-wing politician, journalist and writer.

Born in Poitiers, Vienne, he was educated for the law. Implicated in a plot against Napoleon III in 1853, he was acquitted, but shortly afterwards was imprisoned for belonging to a secret society; for his share in anti-imperialist conspiracies in 1855 he was arrested and deported to Algeria without a trial. The amnesty of 1859 permitted him to return to Paris, where he soon drew the attention of the police to his presence by his violent articles.

During the siege of Paris he left the city in a balloon and joined Gambetta, for whom he organized a system of spies through which General Trochu was kept informed of the strength and disposition of the Prussians around Paris. He was elected to the National Assembly in February 1871, but resigned rather than subscribe to the peace. He had been elected mayor of the 9th arrondissement of Paris in the autumn of 1870, and in March was sent by the same district to the Commune, from which he resigned when he found no reconciliation was possible between the mayors and the Commune. In July he became a member of the municipal council of Paris, and in 1873 was returned to the National Assembly for the department of the Rhône, and took his place on the extreme Left.

A month after his election the governor of Paris demanded his prosecution for his share in the Commune. The claim being granted by a large majority, he escaped to Belgium, where he issued a pamphlet defending his action during the Commune. On his failure to appear before the court he was condemned to death, and remained in Belgium until 1879, when he was included in the amnesty proclaimed by Jules Grévy. During his exile he continued his active collaboration in La Republique francaise. In 1873 he fought a duel with Paul de Cassagnac, and he acted as second to Georges Clemenceau more than once. He energetically defended the republic against the Boulangist agitation, and took an equally courageous part in the Dreyfus affair. In the Picquart-Henry duel he was second to Colonel Picquart. He succeeded Clemenceau as editor of the Aurore, in which Zola's open letter J'Accuse...! had appeared, and was president of the Association of Republican Journalists. In 1903 he became senator for Corsica, and died in August 1908.

In addition to his purely political writings, Arthur Ranc published political novels of the Second Empire, Sous l'empire (1872) and Le roman d'une conspiration (1868).
