= Russian avant-garde =

Russian and Soviet art movement (approx. 1890–1930)

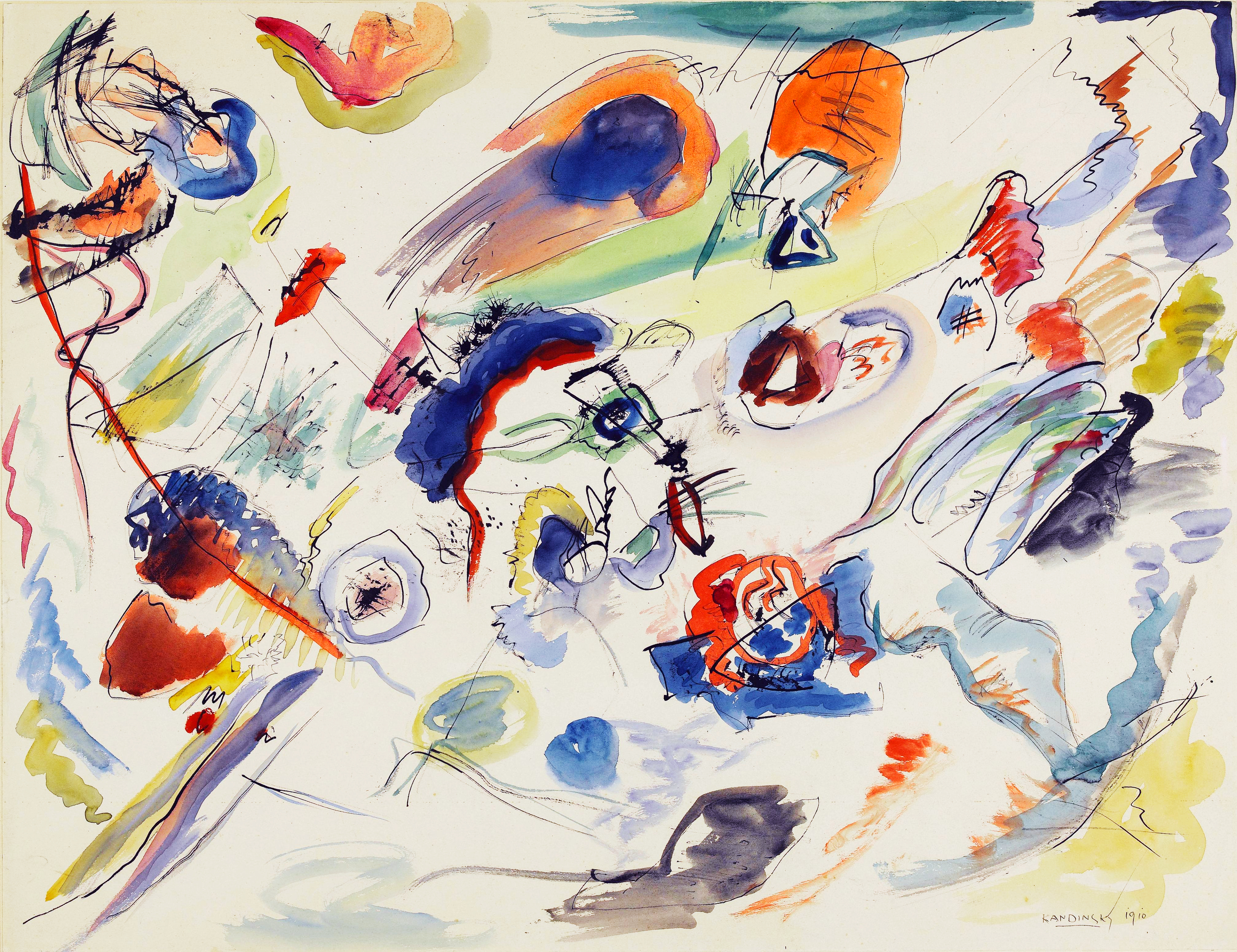
Abstract art. Wassily Kandinsky, Composition VII (Première abstraction), 1913

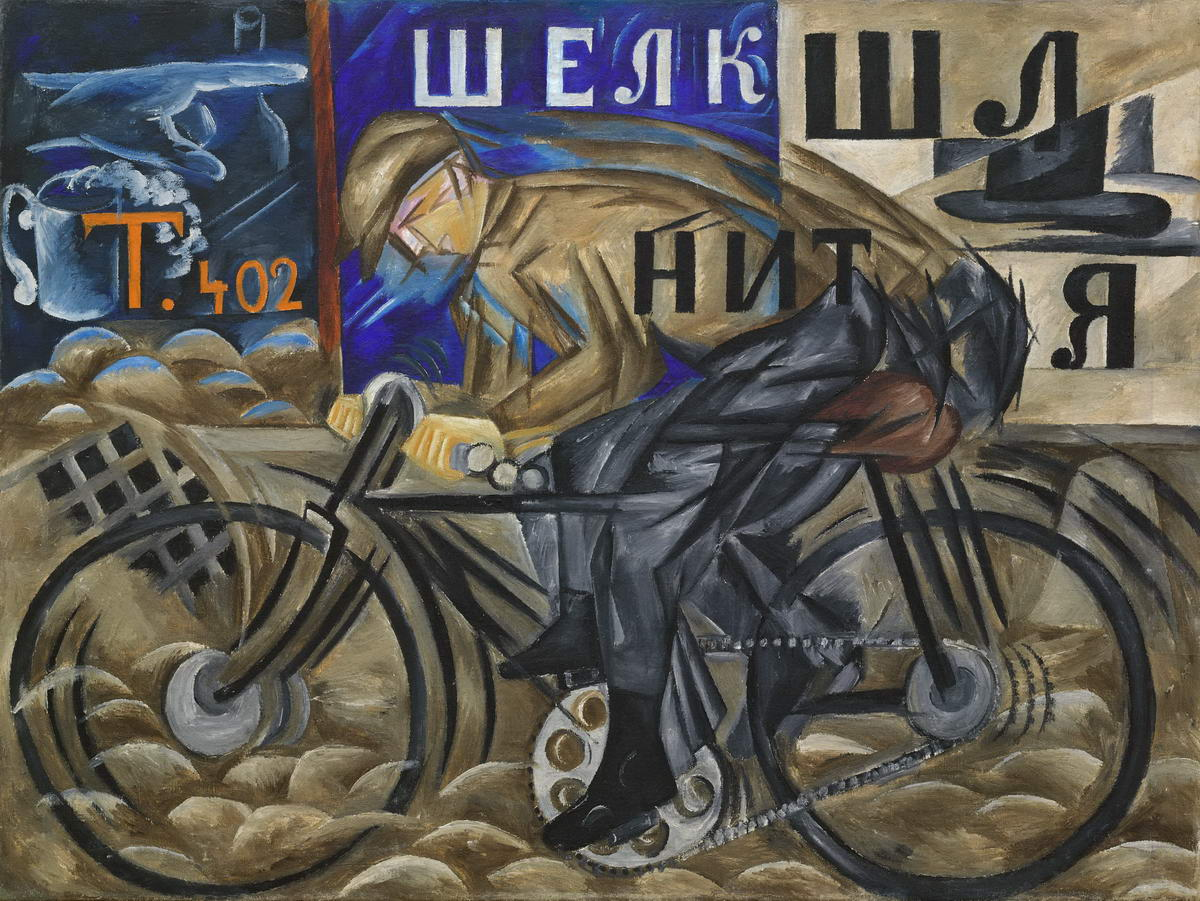
Russian Futurism. Natalia Goncharova, Cyclist, 1913

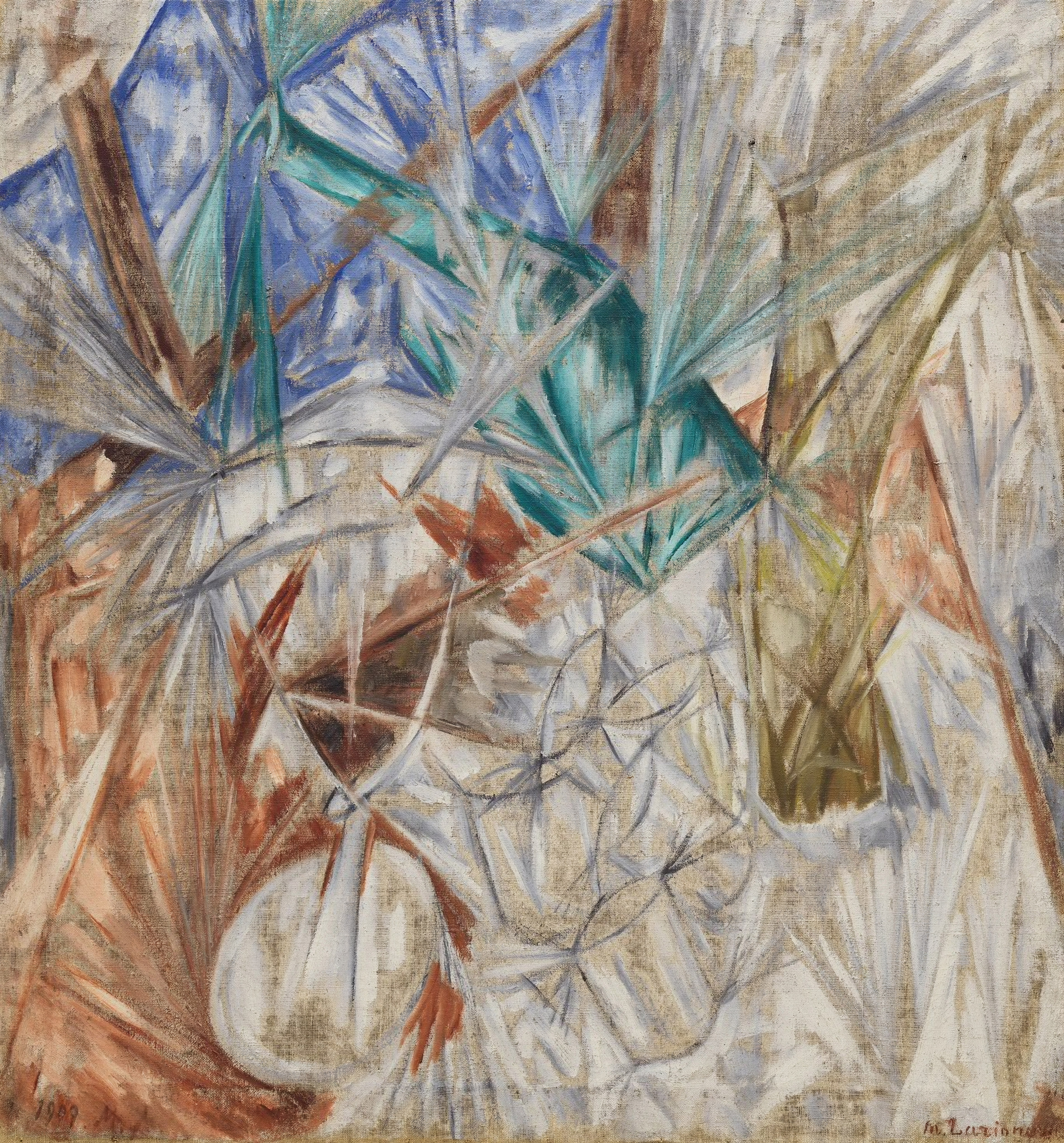
Rayonism. Mikhail Larionov, The Glass, 1912

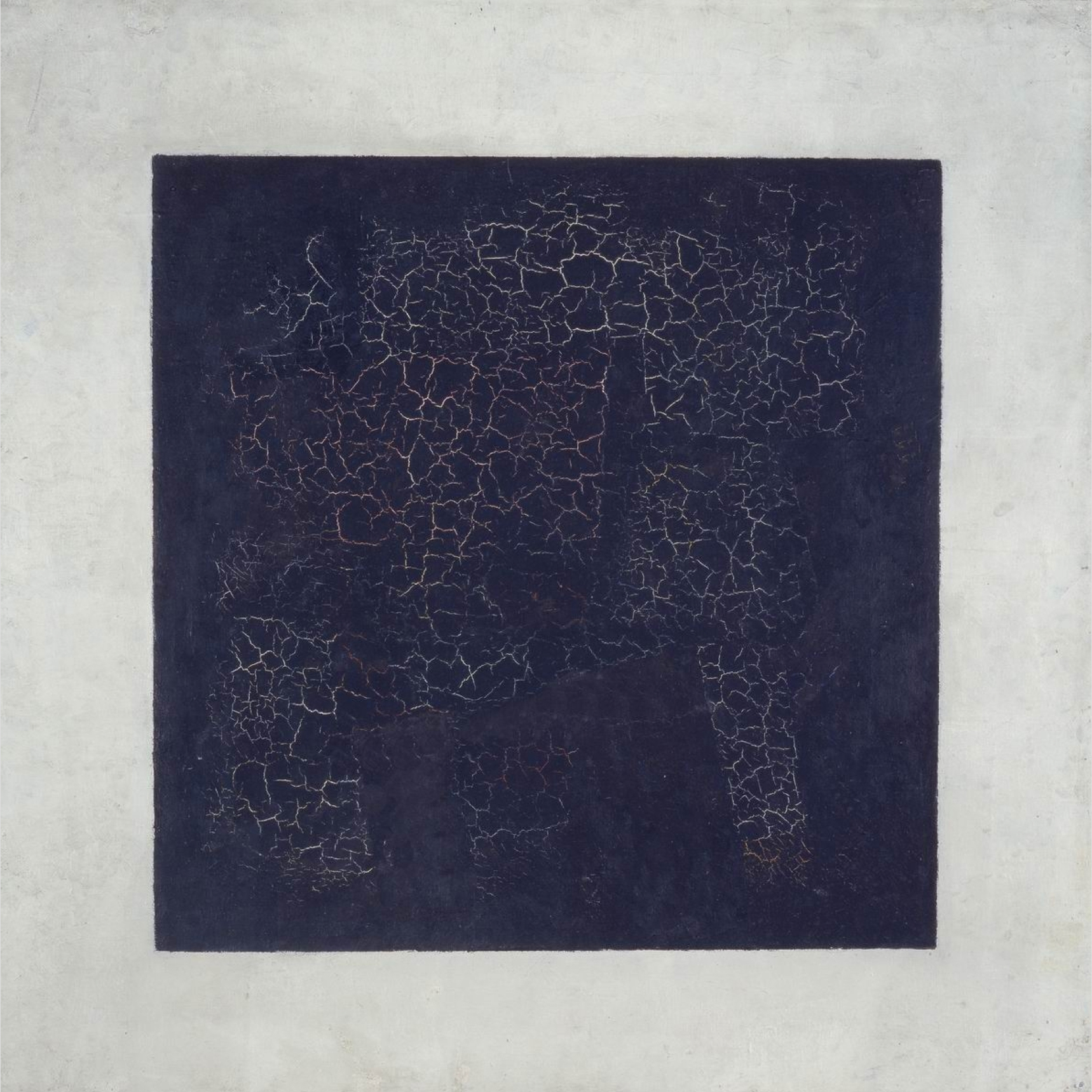
Suprematism. Kazimir Malevich, Black Square, 1915

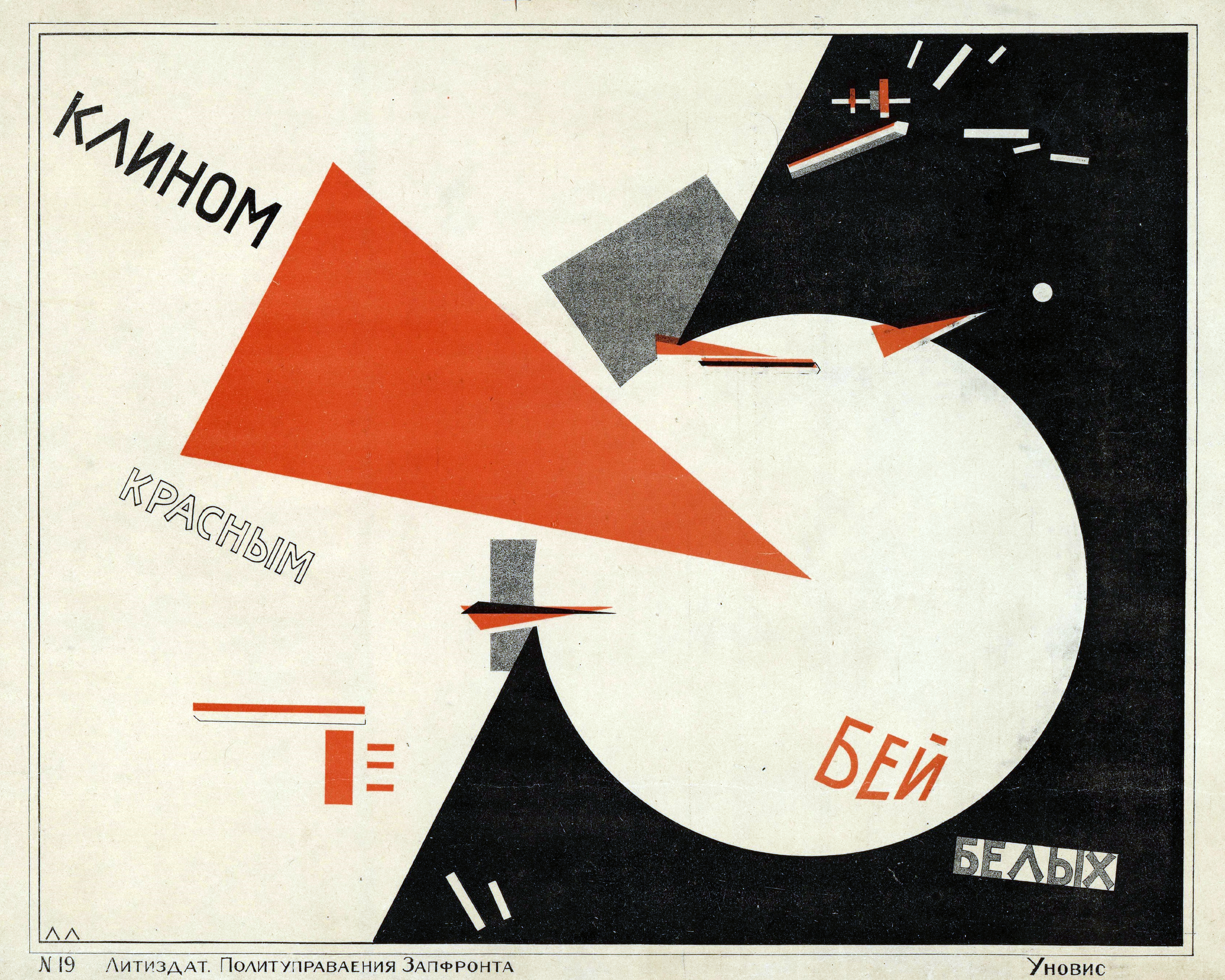
Proletkult. El Lissitzky, Beat the Whites with the Red Wedge, 1919

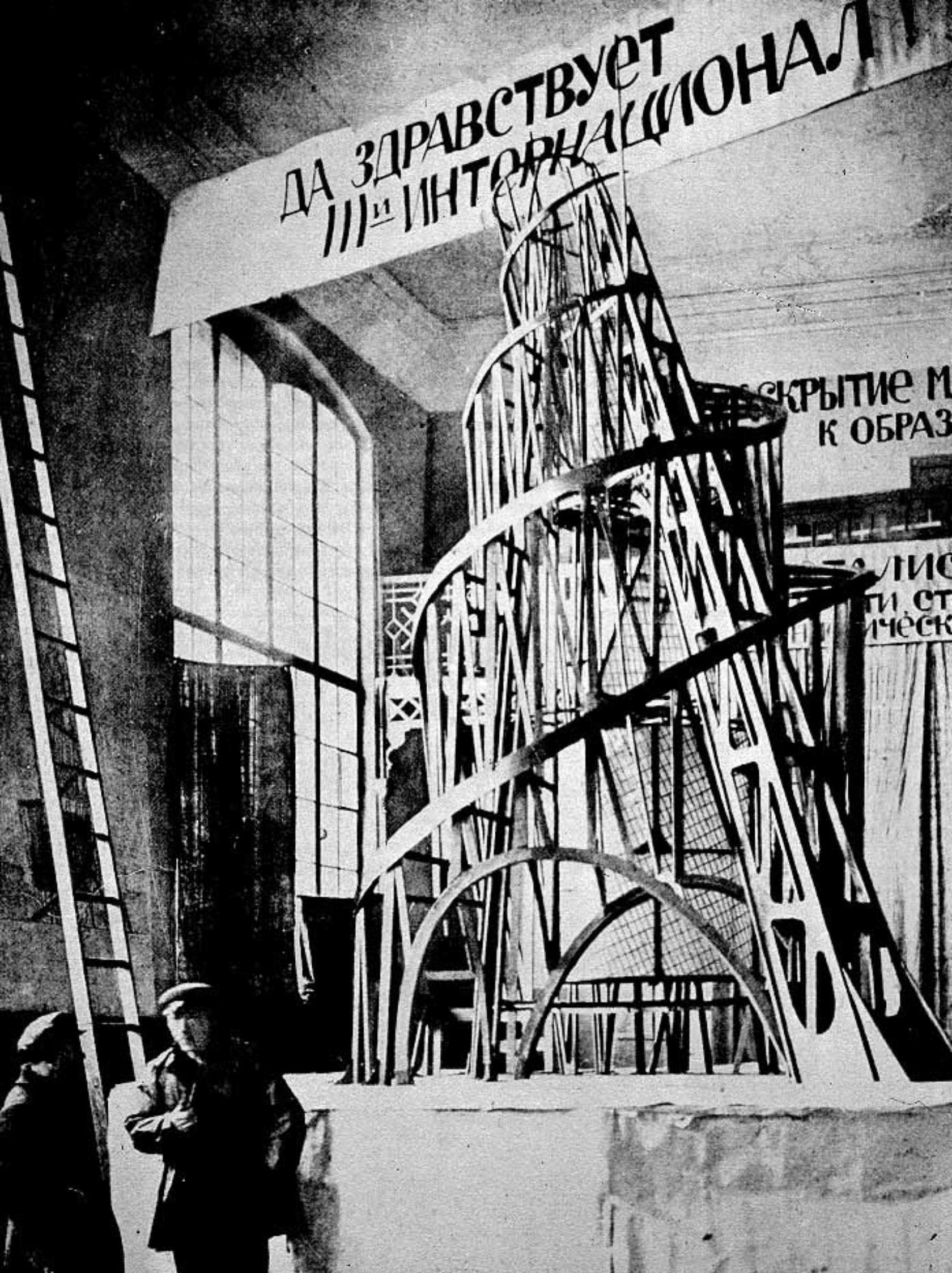
Constructivism. Vladimir Tatlin, Tatlin's Tower, 1919

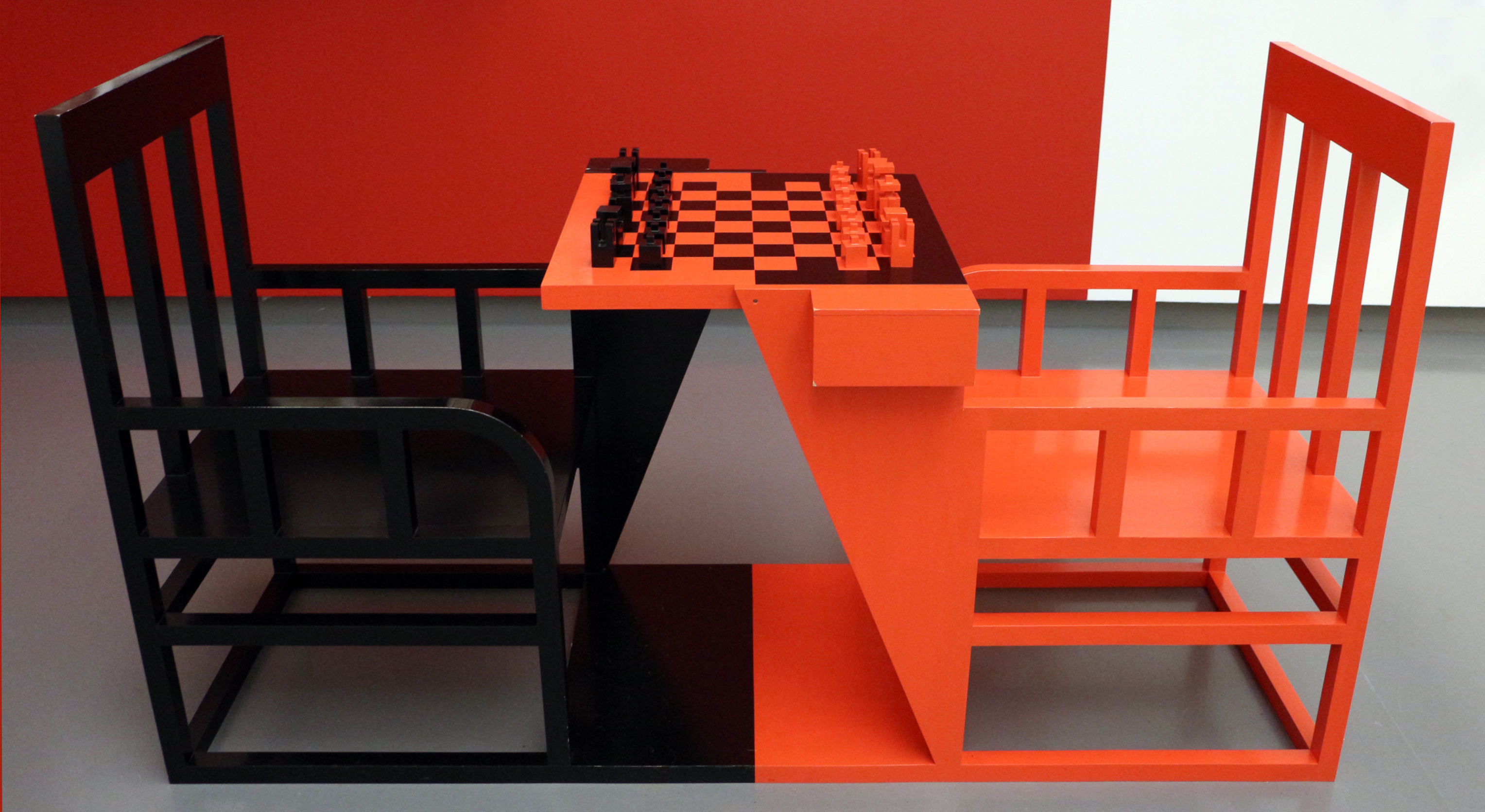
Constructivism. Alexander Rodchenko, chess table design, 1925

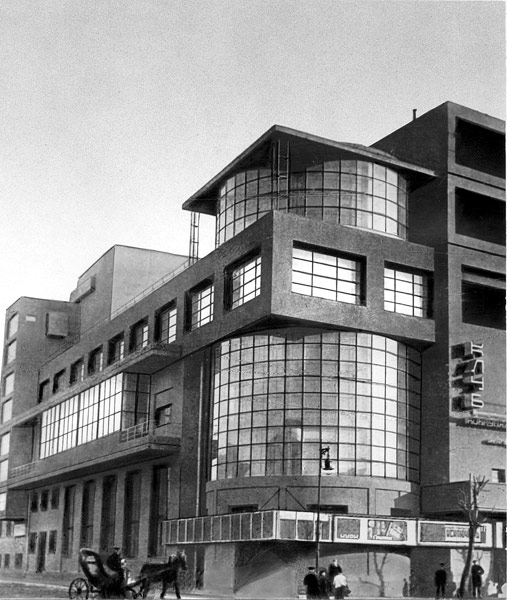
Constructivism. Ilya Golosov, Zuev Club, 1926

The Russian avant-garde was a large, influential wave of avant-garde modern art that flourished in the Russian Empire and the Soviet Union, approximately from 1890 to 1930—although some have placed its beginning as early as 1850 and its end as late as 1960. The term covers many separate, but inextricably related, art movements that flourished at the time; including Suprematism, Constructivism, Russian Futurism, Cubo-Futurism, Zaum, Imaginism, and Neo-primitivism. Many of the artists who were born, grew up or were active in what is now Belarus and Ukraine (including Kazimir Malevich, Aleksandra Ekster, Vladimir Tatlin, David Burliuk, Alexander Archipenko), are also classified in the Ukrainian avant-garde.

The Russian avant-garde reached its creative and popular height in the period between the Russian Revolution of 1917 and 1932, at which point the ideas of the avant-garde clashed with the newly emerged state-sponsored direction of Socialist Realism.

== Influence ==
The Russian avant-garde had a broad impact on twentieth-century abstraction, design, typography, architecture, film, and later sculptural practices. In the field of geometric abstraction, Kazimir Malevich's Suprematism and Vladimir Tatlin's counter-reliefs helped establish a vocabulary of elemental forms, non-objective composition, and material construction. The Metropolitan Museum of Art has described Tatlin's "culture of materials" as one of the sources of Constructivism, while identifying El Lissitzky as a transmitter of Constructivist principles to Germany, where they were later embodied in the teaching of the Bauhaus.

Constructivist ideas circulated internationally through exhibitions, journals, graphic works, and the movement of artists between the Soviet Union and Western Europe. The Museum of Modern Art has noted that Constructivist ideas gained international influence through the Russian exhibition at the Van Diemen Gallery in Berlin in 1922, the Congress of International Progressive Artists in Düsseldorf, and exhibition projects and graphic works by Lissitzky, often made in collaboration with Western European artists. These ideas were later reflected in Bauhaus pedagogy, mid-century sculpture, and Minimal art, including the work of artists such as Sol LeWitt, Mel Bochner, Dorothea Rockburne, Robert Ryman, and Fred Sandback.

The movement also had an important legacy in graphic design, typography, photography, photomontage, book design, textiles, cinema posters, and mass-circulation visual culture. Avant-garde artists including Alexander Rodchenko, Lissitzky, Varvara Stepanova, Liubov Popova, Gustav Klutsis, and the Stenberg brothers transferred abstract composition into practical and reproducible media. MoMA has described the work of Popova, Stepanova, Rodchenko, Malevich's pupils, and the Stenberg brothers as laying the foundations of modern industrial and graphic design, with an important impact on European typography and layout during the 1920s.

The architectural and pedagogical influence of the Russian avant-garde was especially visible in exchanges between VKhUTEMAS and the Bauhaus. MoMA research on interwar architectural magazines describes the Bauhaus and VKhUTEMAS as parallel institutions of radical pedagogy that shared an interest in the integration of artistic work as construction. It also notes the circulation of publications, exhibitions, correspondence, student exchanges, and guest lectures between Germany and the Soviet Union during the 1920s.

In later art criticism and design history, the Russian avant-garde has continued to serve as a reference point for geometric, functional, and systems-based approaches to art. Contemporary art commentary has also discussed Configuratism in connection with Rodchenko's Constructivist work, framing it within a later reception of Russian avant-garde geometry and functional modernist aesthetics.

== Important collections ==
- Russian Museum
- Tretyakov Gallery
- MOMus–Museum of Modern Art–Costakis Collection
- Museum Ludwig

=== Exhibition in Chemnitz 2016/17 ===
Under the rubric "Revolutionary! Russian Avant-Garde from the Vladimir Tsarenkov Collection", the Chemnitz Art Collections displayed 400 loans from 110 Russian avant-garde artists from the years 1907 to around 1930 on the occasion of the 100th anniversary of the Russian October Revolution.

== Artists and designers ==
Notable figures from this era include:

- Alexander Archipenko
- Vladimir Baranoff-Rossine
- Alexander Bogomazov
- David Burliuk
- Vladimir Burliuk
- Marc Chagall
- Ilya Chashnik
- Aleksandra Ekster
- Robert Falk
- Moisey Feigin
- Pavel Filonov
- Artur Fonvizin
- Naum Gabo
- Nina Genke-Meller
- Natalia Goncharova
- Elena Guro
- Vasily Kandinsky
- Lazar Khidekel
- Ivan Kliun
- Gustav Klutsis
- Anna Kogan
- Pyotr Konchalovsky
- Eugène Konopatzky
- Sergei Arksentevich Kolyada
- Alexander Kuprin
- Mikhail Larionov
- Aristarkh Lentulov
- El Lissitzky
- Kazimir Malevich
- Paul Mansouroff
- Ilya Mashkov
- Mikhail Matyushin
- Vadim Meller
- Adolf Milman
- Solomon Nikritin
- Alexander Osmerkin
- Max Penson
- Liubov Popova
- Ivan Puni
- Kliment Red'ko
- Alexei Remizov
- Alexander Rodchenko
- Olga Rozanova
- Léopold Survage
- Varvara Stepanova
- Georgii and Vladimir Stenberg
- Vladimir Tatlin
- Nadezhda Udaltsova
- Vasiliy Yermilov
- Ilya Zdanevich
- Alexandr Zhdanov

== Journals ==
- LEF
- Mir iskusstva

== Filmmakers ==
- Grigori Aleksandrov
- Boris Barnet
- Alexander Dovzhenko
- Sergei Eisenstein
- Lev Kuleshov
- Yakov Protazanov
- Vsevolod Pudovkin
- Dziga Vertov

== Writers ==
- Isaac Babel
- Andrei Bely
- Vladimir Burliuk
- David Burliuk
- Konstantin Fofanov
- Elena Guro
- Velimir Khlebnikov
- Daniil Kharms
- Aleksei Kruchenykh
- Mirra Lokhvitskaya
- Vladimir Mayakovsky
- Igor Severyanin
- Viktor Shklovsky
- Sergei Tretyakov
- Marina Tsvetaeva
- Sergei Yesenin
- Ilya Zdanevich

== Theatre directors ==
- Vsevolod Meyerhold
- Nikolai Evreinov
- Yevgeny Vakhtangov
- Sergei Eisenstein

== Architects ==
- Yakov Chernikhov
- Moisei Ginzburg
- Ilya Golosov
- Ivan Leonidov
- Konstantin Melnikov
- Vladimir Shukhov
- Alexander Vesnin

Preserving Russian avant-garde architecture has become a real concern for historians, politicians and architects. In 2007, MoMA in New York City, devoted an exhibition to Soviet avant-garde architecture in the postrevolutionary period, featuring photographs by Richard Pare.

== Composers ==
- Samuil Feinberg
- Arthur Lourié
- Mikhail Matyushin
- Nikolai Medtner
- Alexander Mossolov
- Nikolai Myaskovsky
- Nikolai Obukhov
- Gavriil Popov
- Sergei Prokofiev
- Nikolai Roslavets
- Leonid Sabaneyev
- Alexander Scriabin
- Vissarion Shebalin
- Dmitri Shostakovich

Many Russian composers that were interested in avant-garde music became members of the Association for Contemporary Music which was headed by Roslavets.

== See also ==
- Agitprop
- Avant-garde
- Constructivist art
- Constructivist architecture
- Cubo-Futurism
- Ego-Futurism
- Knave of Diamonds
- Imaginism
- Oberiu
- Proletkult
- Rayonism
- Russian Symbolism
- Russian Futurism
- Suprematism
- Soviet art
- Soviet montage theory
- Universal Flowering
- UNOVIS
- Vkhutemas
- Zaum
