= Tišler =

Tišler is a Slovenian surname that corresponds to German Tischler. Notable people with the surname include:

- Janko Tišler (1923–2007), Slovenian-Austrian author and anti-Nazi resistance fighter
- Miha Tišler, Slovenian chemist
- Viktor Tišler, Slovenian ice hockey player
