= Aleksandra Ekster =

Russian-French painter (1882–1949)

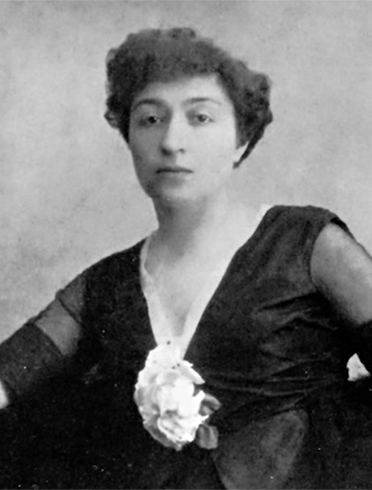
- Ekster in 1915
- Born: Aleksandra Aleksandrovna Grigorovich; 18 January [O.S. 6 January] 1882; Białystok, Grodno Governorate, Russian Empire (now Poland)
- Died: 17 March 1949 (aged 67); Fontenay-aux-Roses, France
- Other name: Alexandra Exter
- Education: Kyiv Art School, 1906
- Known for: Painting, graphic arts, stage design, costume design
- Movement: Futurism, Cubism, Constructivism
- Spouse(s): Nikolai Ekster (m. 1908; died 1918) Georgii Nekrasov (m. 1920; died 1945)

Aleksandra Aleksandrovna Ekster (née Grigorovich; Russian: Алекса́ндра Алекса́ндровна Эксте́р; Ukrainian: Олекса́ндра Олекса́ндрівна Е́кстер; 18 January [O.S. 6 January] 1882 – 17 March 1949), also known as Alexandra Exter, was a Russian and French painter and designer.

As a young woman, her studio in Kiev attracted all the city's creative luminaries, and she became a figure of the Paris salons, mixing with Picasso, Braque and others. She is identified with the Russian/Ukrainian avant-garde, as a Cubo-futurist, Constructivist, and influencer of the Art Deco movement. She was the teacher of several School of Paris artists such as Abraham Mintchine, Isaac Frenkel Frenel and the film directors Grigori Kozintsev, Sergei Yutkevich among others.

== Early life ==
Aleksandra Aleksandrovna Grigorovich (Note: Ukrainian: Oleksandra Oleksandrivna Hryhorovych.) was born on 18 January [O.S. 6 January] 1882 in Białystok, Grodno Governorate (present-day Poland) to a wealthy Belarusian family. Her father, Aleksandr Grigorovich, was a wealthy Belarusian businessman. Her mother was Greek.

Young Aleksandra received an excellent private education, studying languages, music, art, and taking private drawing lessons. Soon her parents moved to Kiev, and Asya, as called by her friends, attended St.Olha Gymnasium.

Ekster later studied painting at the Kyiv Art School, where she studied with other future stars of avant-garde movement Oleksandr Bohomazov and Alexander Archipenko. Her teachers included prominent Ukrainian painter Mykola Pymonenko. Ekster graduated in 1906.

== Artistic periods ==
=== Kiev ===
Her painting studio in the attic at 27 Funduklievskaya Street, now Khmelnytsky Street, was a rallying stage for Kiev's intellectual elite. In the attic in her studio, there worked future luminaries of world decorative art Vadym Meller, Anatol Petrytsky and P. Tchelitchew. There she was visited by poets and writers, such as Anna Akhmatova, Ilia Ehrenburg, and Osip Mandelstam, choreographer Bronislava Nijinska and dancer Elsa Kruger, as well as many artists Alexander Bogomazov, Wladimir Baranoff-Rossine, and students, such as Grigori Kozintsev, Sergei Yutkevich, Aleksei Kapler and Abraham Mintchine among many others. In 1908, she participated in an exhibition together with members of the group Zveno (Link) organized by David Burliuk, Vladimir Burliuk and others in Kiev.

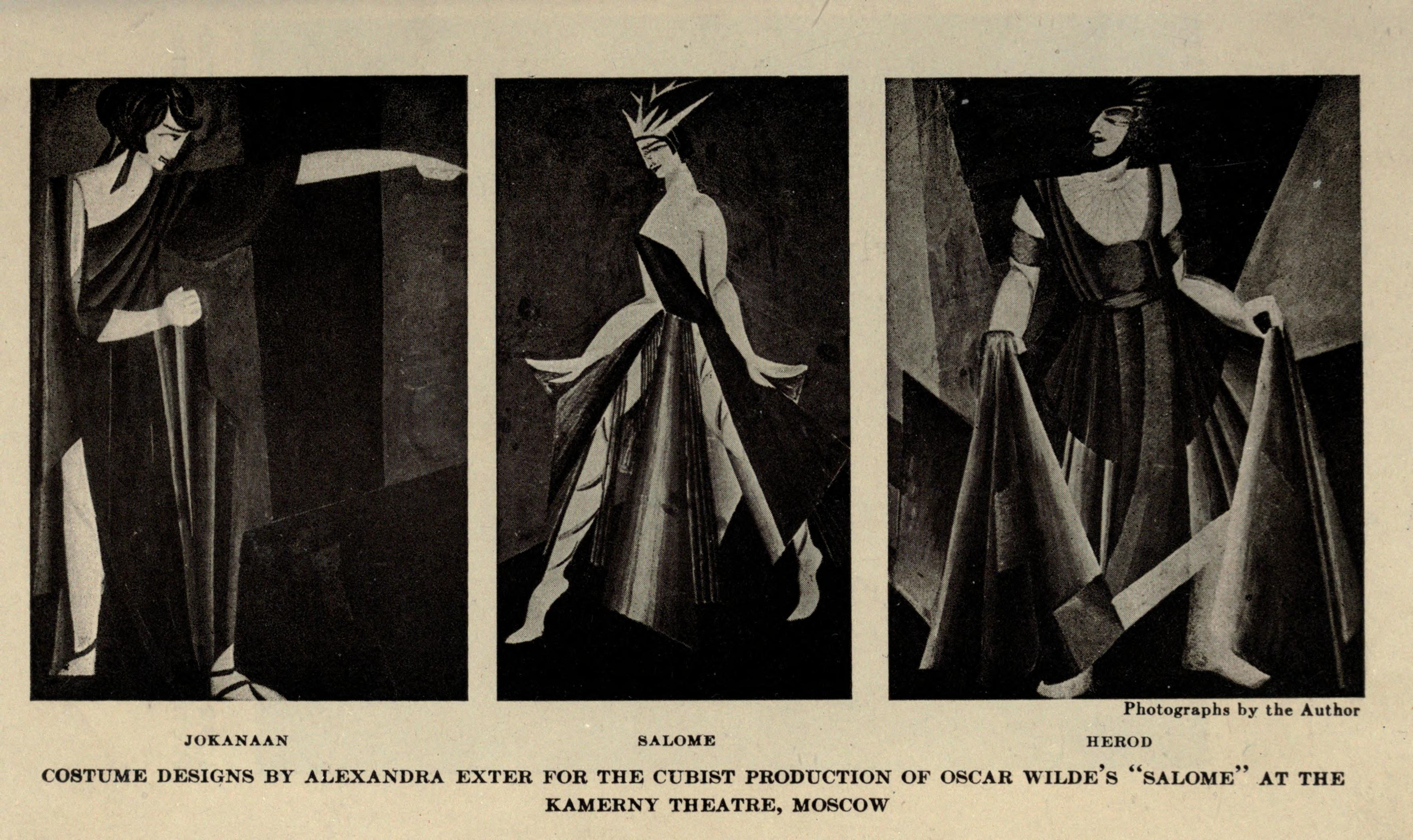
Costumes designed by Ekster.

=== Paris ===
In Paris, Ekster became personally acquainted with Pablo Picasso and Georges Braque, who introduced her to Gertrude Stein.

Under the name Alexandra d'Exter she exhibited six works at the Salon de la Section d'Or, Galerie La Boétie, Paris, October 1912, with Jean Metzinger, Albert Gleizes, Marcel Duchamp and others.

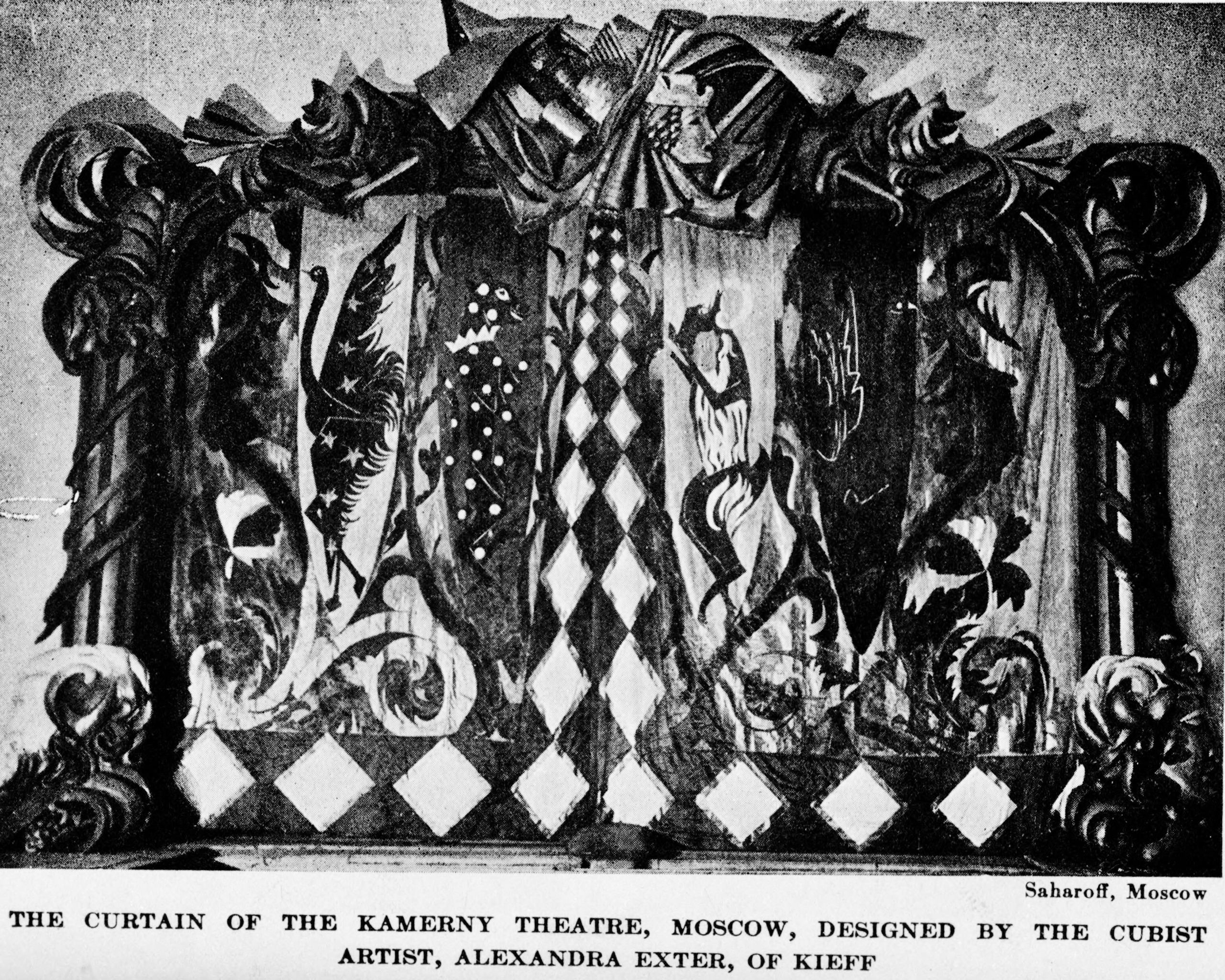
Theatre curtain designed by Ekster.

In 1914, Exter participated in the Salon des Indépendants exhibitions in Paris, together with Kazimir Malevich, Alexander Archipenko, Vadym Meller, Sonia Delaunay-Terk and other French and Russian artists. In that same year, she participated with the "Russians" Archipenko, Koulbine and Rozanova in the International Futurist Exhibition in Rome. In 1915, she joined the group of avant-garde artists Supremus. Her friend introduced her to the poet Apollinaire, who took her to Picasso's workshop. According to Moscow Chamber Theatre actress Alice Coonen, "In [Ekster's] Parisian household there was a conspicuous peculiar combination of European culture with Ukrainian life. On the walls between Picasso and Braque paintings, there was Ukrainian embroidery; on the floor was a Ukrainian carpet, at the table they served clay pots, colorful majolica plates of dumplings."

=== Russian avant-garde ===
Under the avant-garde umbrella, Ekster has been noted to be a suprematist and constructivist painter as well as a major influencer of the Art Deco movement.

While not confined within a particular movement, Ekster was one of the most experimental women of the avant-garde. Ekster absorbed from many sources and cultures in order to develop her own original style. In 1915–1916, she worked in the peasant craft cooperatives in the villages Skoptsi and Verbovka along with Kazimir Malevich, Yevgenia Pribylskaya, Natalia Davidova, Nina Genke, Liubov Popova, Ivan Puni, Olga Rozanova, Nadezhda Udaltsova and others. Ekster later founded a teaching and production workshop (MDI) in Kiev (1918–1920). Alexander Tyshler, Vadym Meller, Anatol Petrytsky, Kliment Red'ko, Tchelitchew, Shifrin, Nikritin worked there. Also during this period, she was one of the leading stage designers of Alexander Tairov's Chamber Theatre.

In 1919, together with other avant-garde artists Kliment Red'ko and Nina Genke-Meller, she decorated the streets and squares of Kiev and Odessa in abstract style for Revolution Festivities. She worked with Vadym Meller as a costume designer in a ballet studio of the dancer Bronislava Nijinska. One of her students in her studio in Odessa was Isaac Frenkel Frenel, who would later become an École de Paris painter.

In 1921, she became a director of the elementary course Color at the Higher Artistic-Technical Workshop (VKhUTEMAS) in Moscow, a position she held until 1924. Her work was displayed alongside that of other Constructivist artists at the 5x5=25 exhibition held in Moscow in 1921.

In the spring of 1924, Alexandra Exter travelled to Venice to take part in organising the 14th Venice Biennale. Most of Ekster's works were not exposed but were part of the exhibition catalogue. Yet, she also created a special painting inspired by Venice at the entrance hall on the second floor of the Soviet Pavilion. Several pieces of research on this painting are now in international and private collections.

=== Revolutionising costume design ===
In line with her eclectic avant-garde-like style, Ekster's early paintings strongly influenced her costume design as well as her book illustrations, which are scarcely noted. All of Ekster's works, no matter the medium, stick to her distinct style. Her works are vibrant, playful, dramatic, and theatrical in composition, subject matter, and color. Ekster constantly stayed true to her composition aesthetic across all mediums. Furthermore, each medium only enhanced and influenced her work in other mediums.

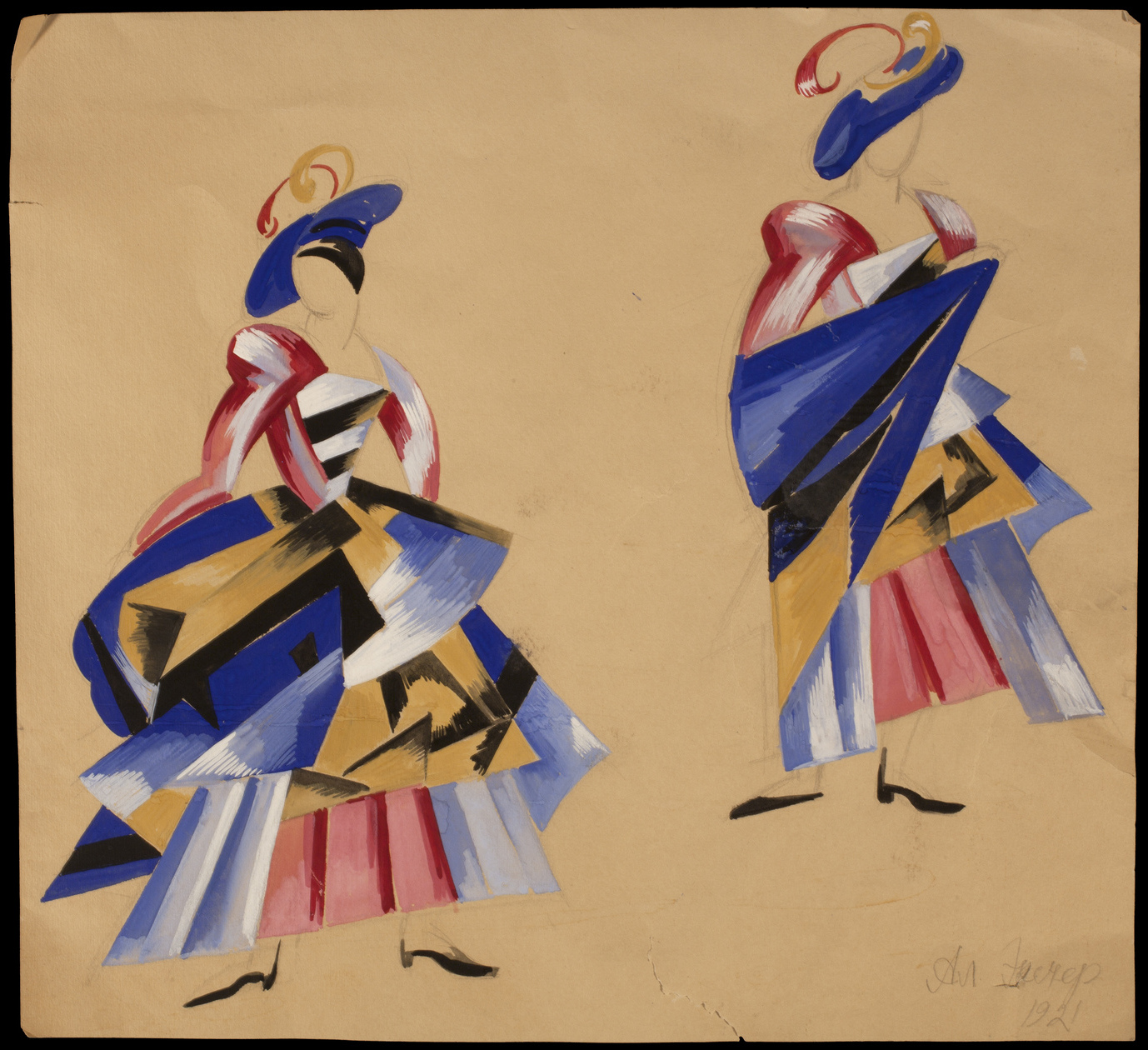
Costume design for Romeo and Juliet. 1921. M.T. Abraham Foundation.

With her assimilation of many different genres, her essential futurist and cubist ideas were always in tandem with her attention to colour and rhythm. Ekster uses many elements of geometric compositions, which reinforce the core intentions of dynamism, vibrant contrasts, and free brushwork. Ekster stretched the dynamic intentions of her work across all mediums. Ekster's theatrical works such as sculptures, costume design, set design, and decorations for the revolutionary festivals, strongly reflect her work with geometric elements and vibrant intentions.

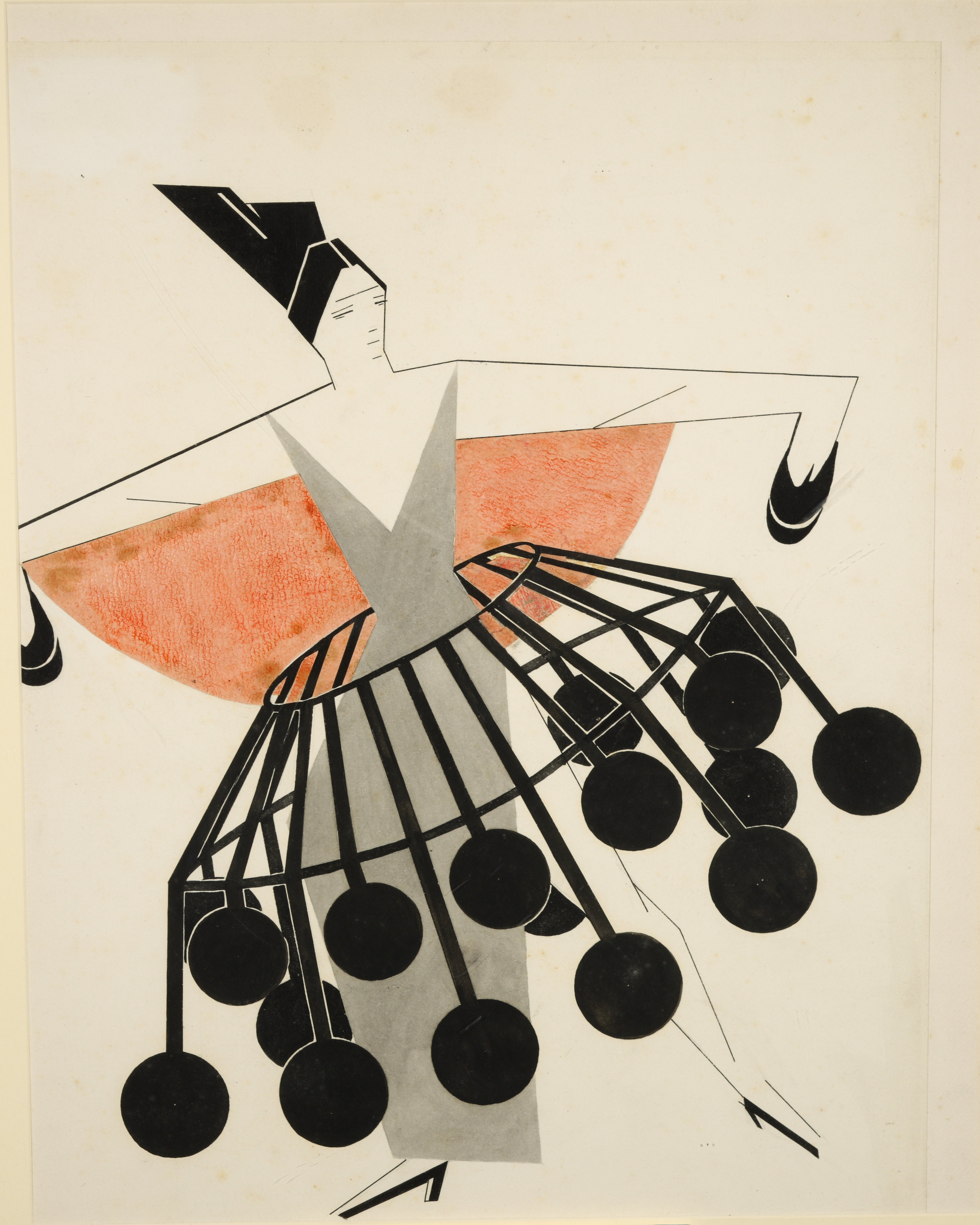
Alexandra Exter, sketch, Lobanov-Rostovsky coll.

Through her costume work, she experimented with the transparency, movement, and vibrancy of fabrics. Ekster's movement of her brushstroke in her artwork is reflected in the movement of the fabric in her costumes. Ekster's theatrical sets used multi-coloured dimensions and experimented with spatial structures. She continued with these experimental tendencies in her later puppet designs. With her experimentation across many mediums, Ekster started to take the concept of her costume design and integrate it into everyday life. In 1921, Ekster's work in fashion design began. Though her mass production designs were wearable, most of her fashion design was highly decorative and innovative, usually falling under the category of haute couture.

In 1923, she continued her work in many media in addition to collaborating with Vera Mukhina and Boris Gladkov in Moscow on the decor of the All Russian Exhibition pavilions.

In 1924, Ekster was the costume designer for the film Aelita.

=== Ukrainian folk influences ===
Thanks to the connections of her husband, Nikolai Ekster, Aleksandra met Natalia Davydova, who had an estate with craftsmanship in Verbivtsi near Cherkasy. It was there that the artist, who is now considered a representative of European Cubism, Futurism, Ukrainian avant-garde, one of the founders of the Art Deco style, discovered Ukrainian folk art, that was one of the influences in her works. According to Georgy Kovalenko, a researcher of Aleksandra Ekster's work, the time in Verbivka was the determining factor in the artist's painting, her colourful poem and became a source of imagery: "She conducted real scientific expeditions in search of ancient peasant embroideries, liturgical sewing, and weaving items," Kovalenko wrote in his monograph.

Ekster and Davydova with other researchers searched for folk motifs, reinterpreted them, modernized them and, together with Kazimir Malevich, Ivan Puni, Ksenia Boguslavska, drew supremacist designs for embroideries on bags, pillows, carpets, and belts. Later, they created the Kiev handicraft society and also presented embroideries from Verbivtsi at exhibitions in Kiev and European countries. In 1917, more than 400 works were exhibited in Moscow, from where they never returned.

== Personal life ==
In 1908, Aleksandra Grigorovich married a successful Kiev lawyer, Nikolai Evgenyevich Ekster. The Eksters belonged to the cultural and intellectual elite of Kiev. She spent several months with her husband in Paris, and there she attended Académie de la Grande Chaumière in Montparnasse. From 1908 to 1924, she intermittently lived in Kiev, St. Petersburg, Odessa, Paris, Rome and Moscow. Nikolai Ekster died in 1918 in Kiev.

In 1920, Ekster married the Moscow actor Georgii Georgievich Nekrasov (Russian: Георгия Георгиевича Некрасова; 1878–1945).

In 1924, Aleksandra Ekster and her husband emigrated to France and settled in Paris, where she initially became a professor at the Academie Moderne. From 1926 to 1930, Ekster was a professor at Fernand Léger's Académie d'Art Contemporain. In 1933, she began creating beautiful and original illuminated manuscripts (gouache on paper), perhaps the most important works of the last phase of her life. The "Callimaque" manuscript (c. 1939, the text being a French translation of a hymn by Hellenistic poet Callimachus) is widely regarded as her masterpiece. The only study of these manuscripts is William Cole, Alexandra Exter: The Illustrated Manuscripts (Sitges, 2025). From 1933 her work was limited as her health was declining with heart disease. In 1936, she participated in the exhibition Cubism and Abstract Art in New York and went on to have solo exhibitions in Prague and in Paris. She was a book illustrator for the publishing company Flammarion. She drew illustrations for several poetry books and for three of Marie Colmont's children's books, which were published from 1939 to 1940.

During World War II, she and her husband lived in harsh poverty. After her husband died in 1945, her last work was a sculpture of an angel, which would be placed above what would be their joint grave site. She died in Paris in 1949 and is buried at the cemetery of Fontenay-aux-Roses.

During the past few decades, her reputation has increased dramatically, as have the prices of her works. As a consequence, hundreds of fakes have appeared on the market in recent years.

== Representative works ==
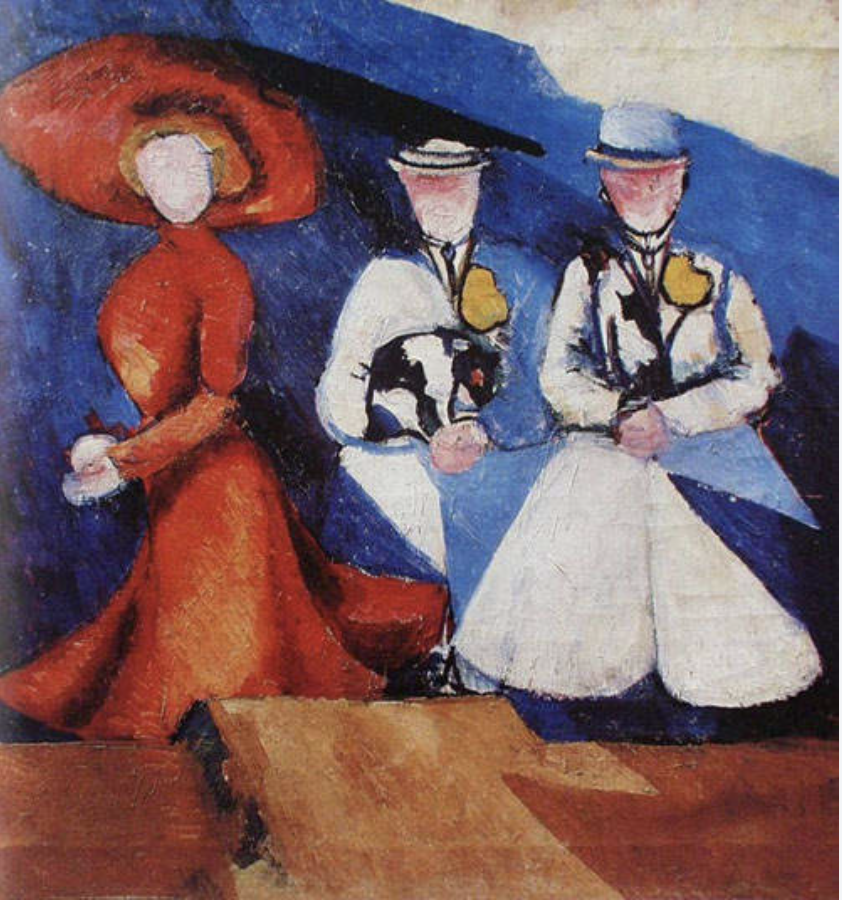
Three Female Figures, 1910

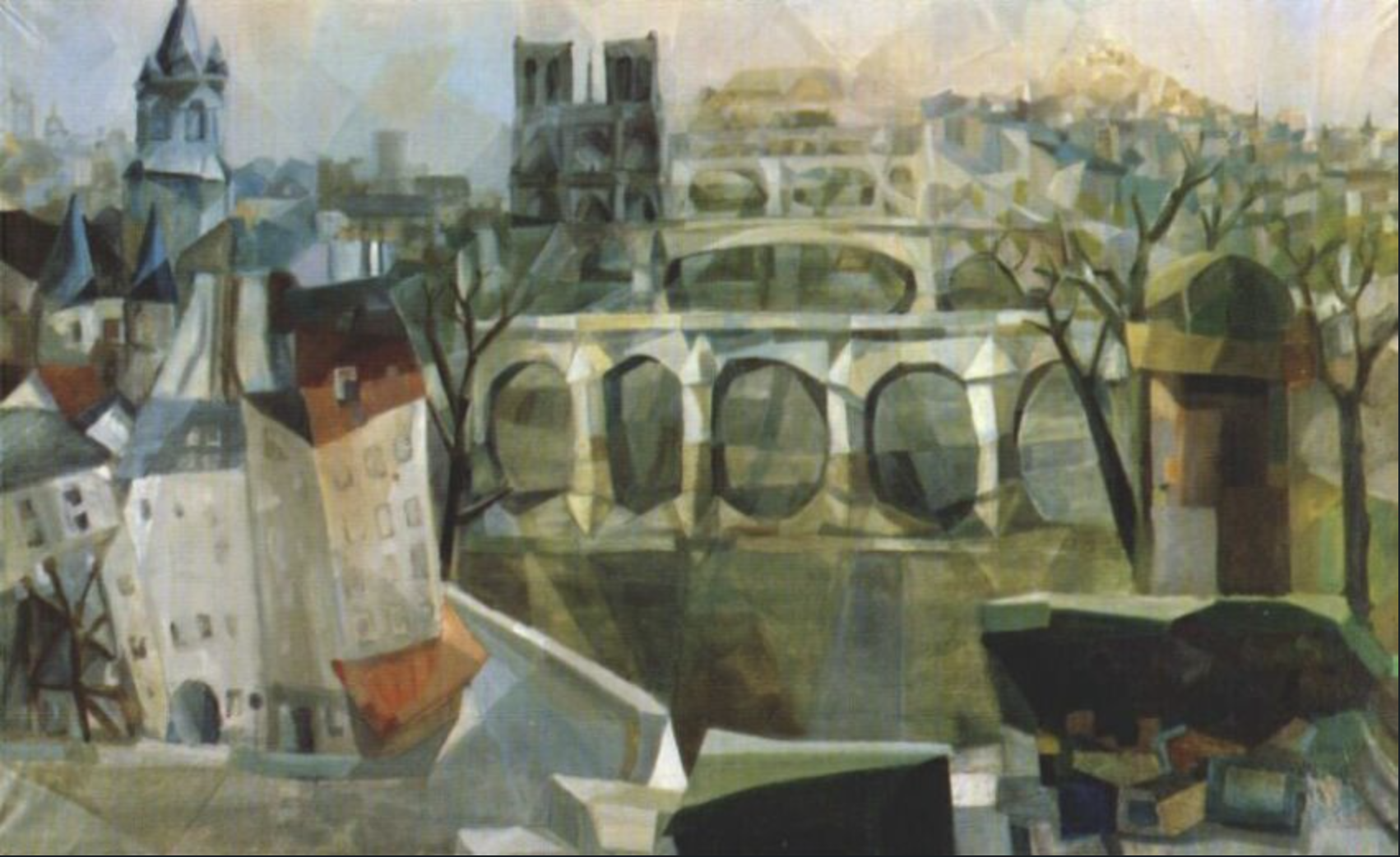
Paris Cityscape, 1912

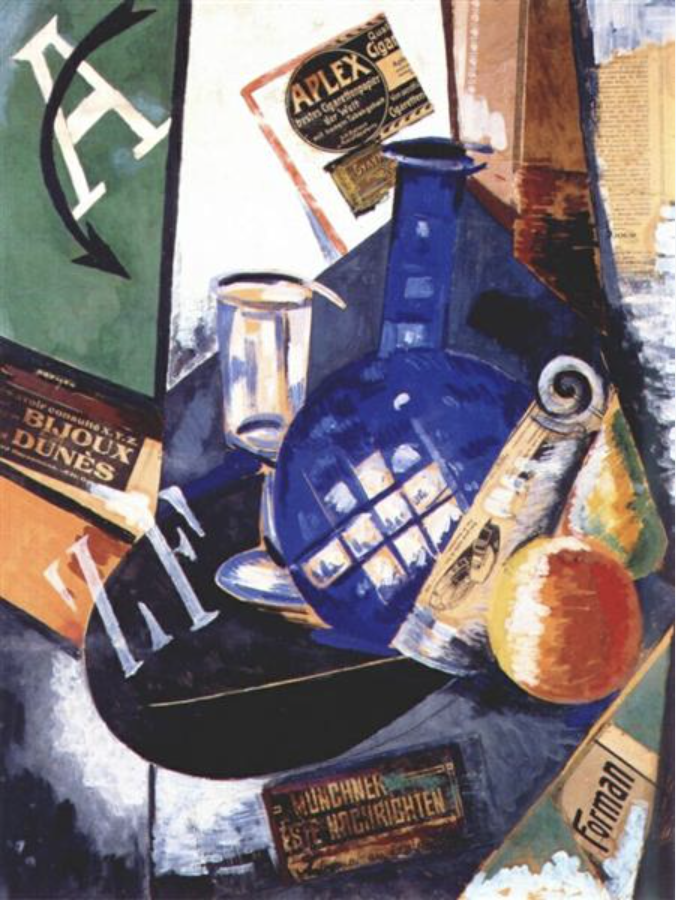
Still Life, 1913

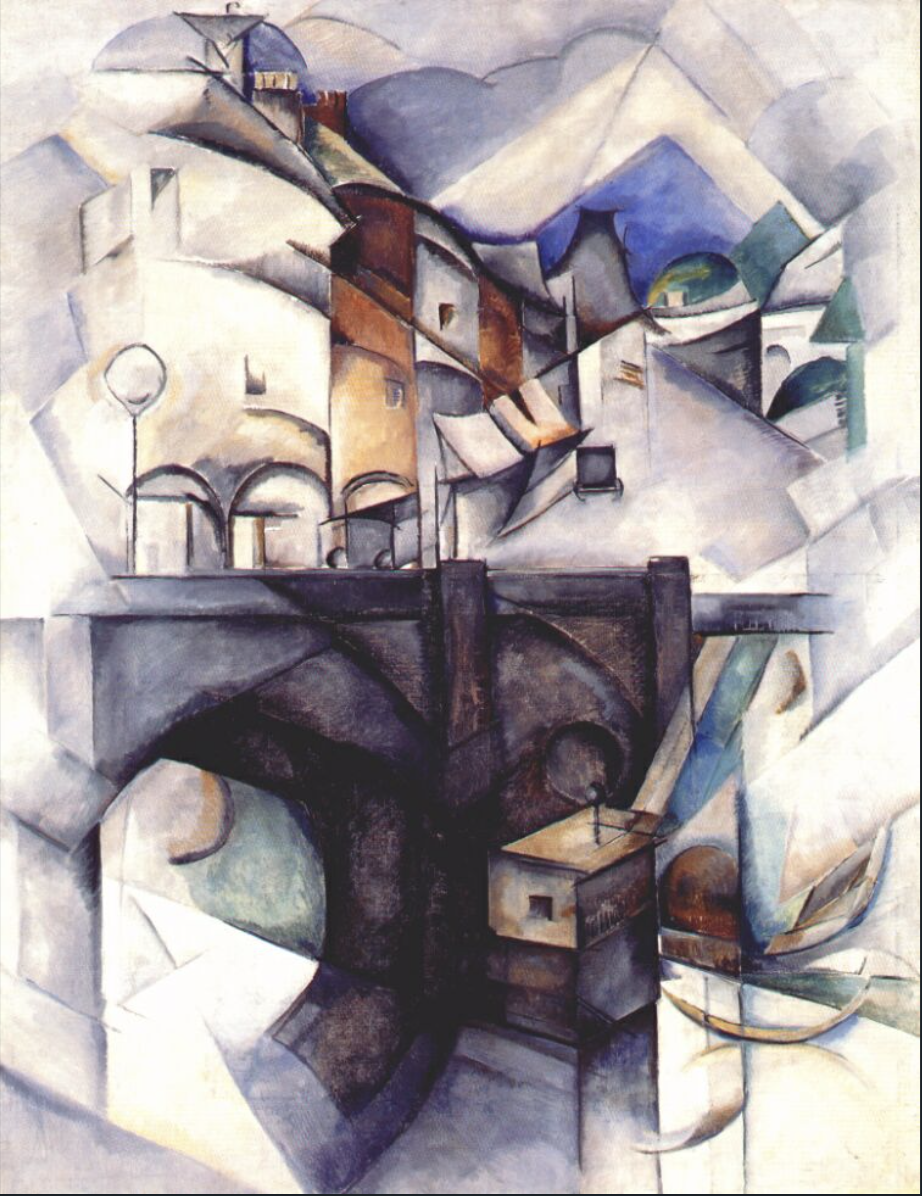
Bridge. Sevre, 1914

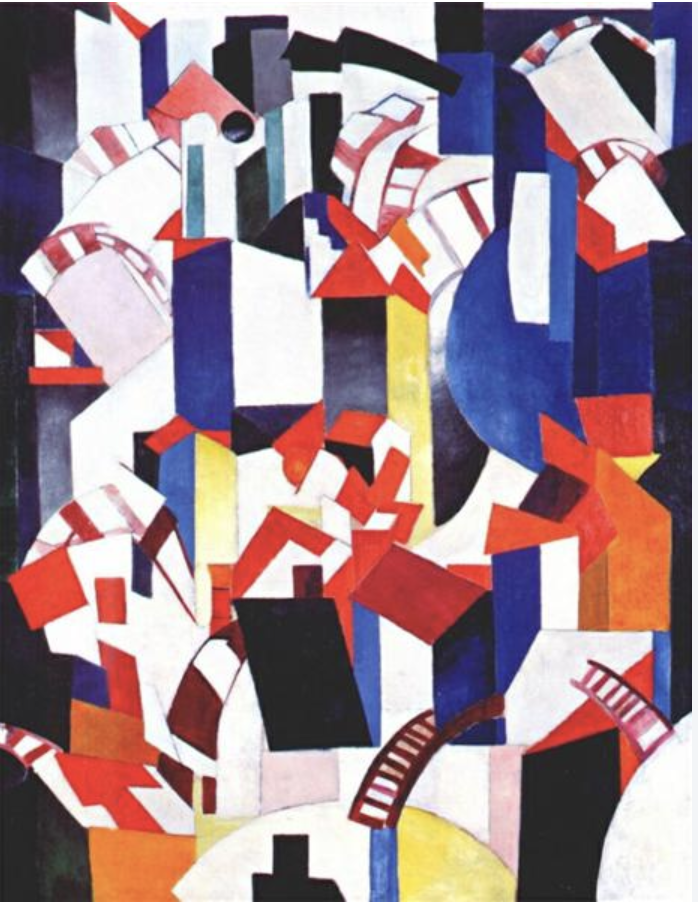
Venice, 1915

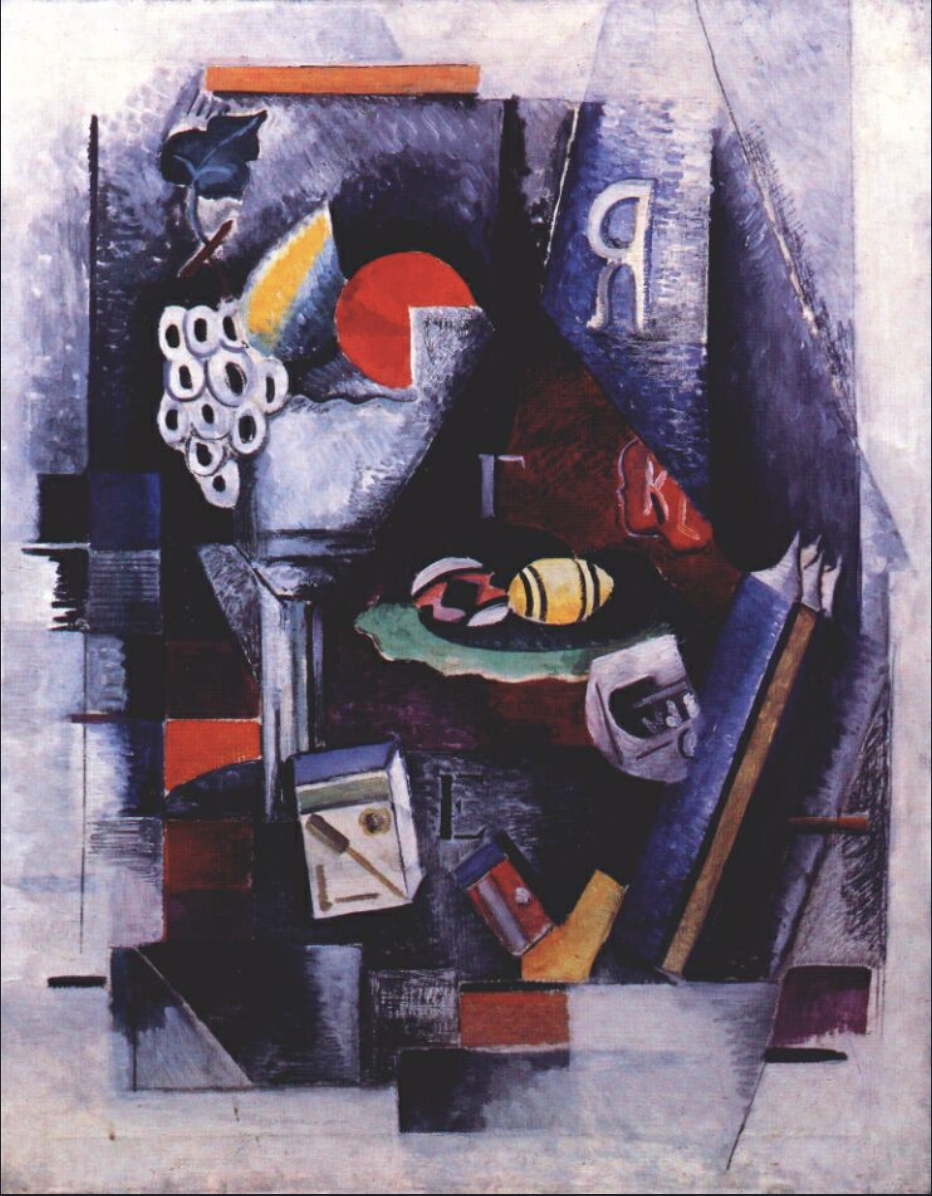
Still Life with Eggs, 1915

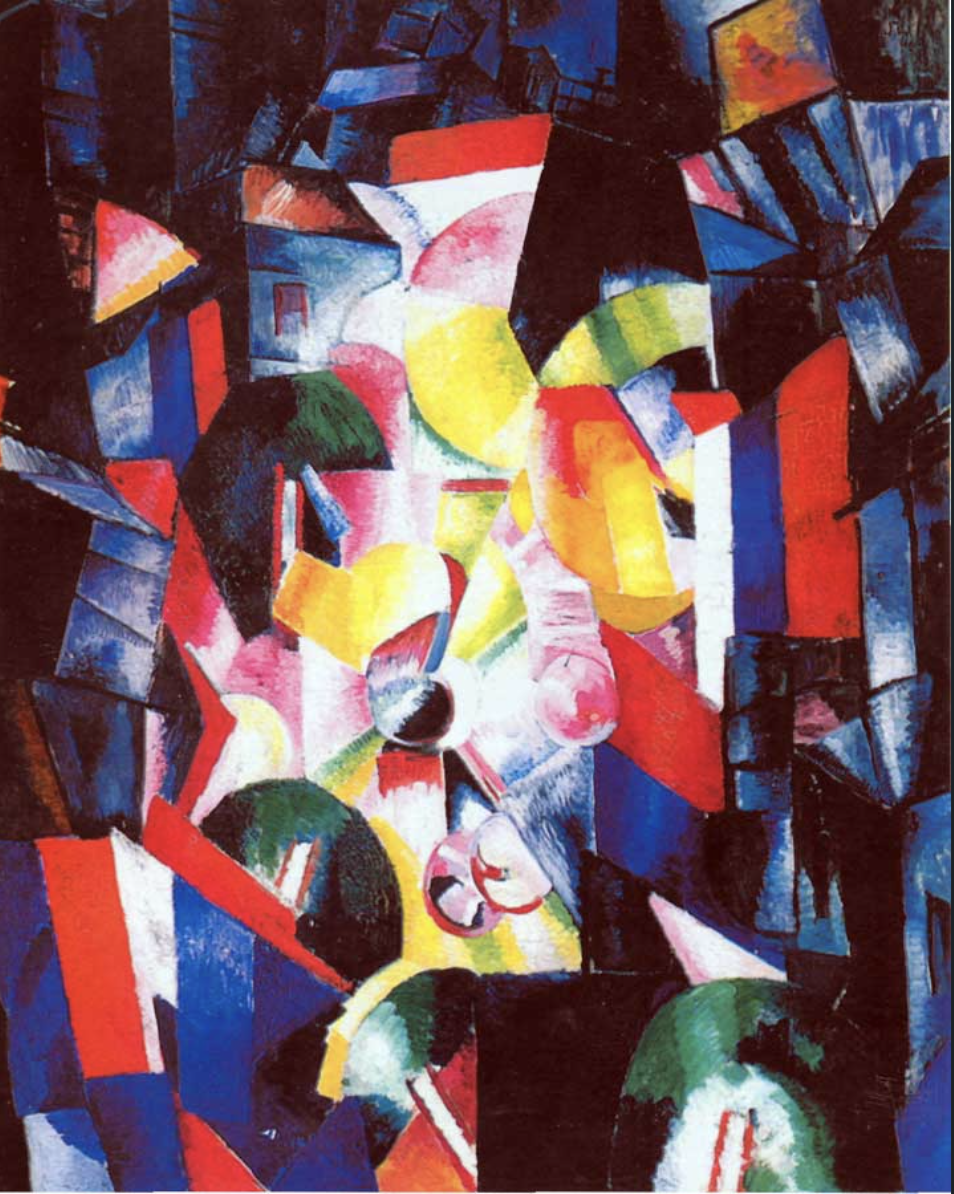
City at Night, 1919
