= Lyubov Popova =

Russian artist (1889–1924)

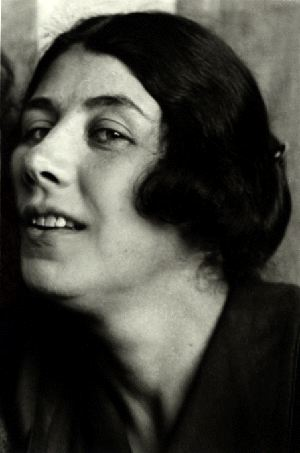
- Lyubov Popova, before 1920
- Born: 24 April 1889; Ivanovskoe, Moscow Governorate, Russian Empire
- Died: 25 May 1924 (aged 35); Moscow, Soviet Union
- Known for: Painting, stage design, textile design, book design
- Movement: Russian avant-garde, Cubo-Futurism, Suprematism, Constructivism

Lyubov Sergeyevna Popova (Russian: Любо́вь Серге́евна Попо́ва; 24 April 1889 – 25 May 1924) was a Russian-Soviet avant-garde artist, painter and designer.

== Early life ==
Popova was born in Ivanovskoe, near Moscow, to the wealthy family of Sergei Maximovich Popov, a very successful textile merchant and vigorous patron of the arts, and Lyubov Vasilievna Zubova, who came from a highly cultured family. Lyubov Sergeyevna had two brothers and a sister: Sergei was the eldest, then Lyubov, Pavel and Olga. Pavel became a philosopher and the guardian of his sister's artistic legacy.

Popova grew up with a strong interest in art, especially Italian Renaissance painting. At eleven years old she began formal art lessons at home. She was first enrolled in Yaltinskaia's Women's Gymnasium, then in Arseneva's Gymnasium in Moscow. By the age of 18 she was studying with Stanislav Zhukovsky, and in 1908 entered the private studios of Konstantin Yuon and Ivan Dudin. Between 1912 and 1913, she began attending the studios of the Cubist painters Henri Le Fauconnier and Jean Metzinger at Académie de La Palette in Paris.

== Career ==
=== Travels ===
Popova traveled widely to investigate and learn from diverse styles of painting, but it was the ancient Russian icons, the paintings of Giotto, and the works of the 15th- and 16th-century Italian painters which interested her the most.

In 1909 she traveled to Kiev, then in 1910 to Pskov and Novgorod. The following year she visited other ancient Russian cities, including St. Petersburg, to study icons. In 1912 she worked in a Moscow studio known as "The Tower" with Ivan Aksenov and Vladimir Tatlin, and also visited Sergei Shchukin's collection of modern French paintings.

In 1912–1913 she studied art with Nadezhda Udaltsova in Paris, where she met Alexander Archipenko, and Ossip Zadkine in 1913. After returning to Russia that same year, she worked with Tatlin, Udaltsova, and the Vesnin brothers.

In 1914 she traveled in France and Italy during the development of Cubism and Futurism.

== Style ==
=== Cubo-Futurism ===
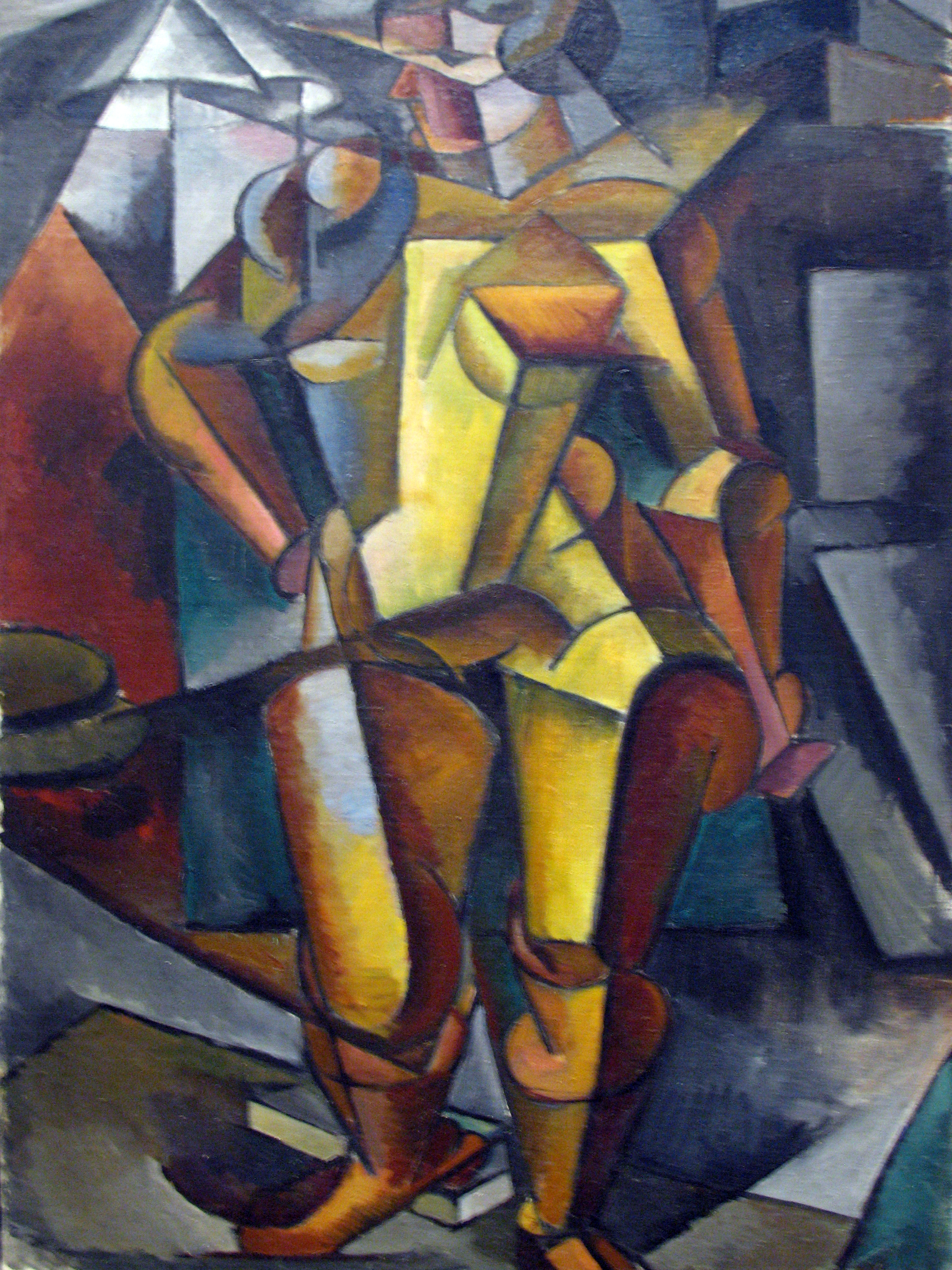
The Model, 1913

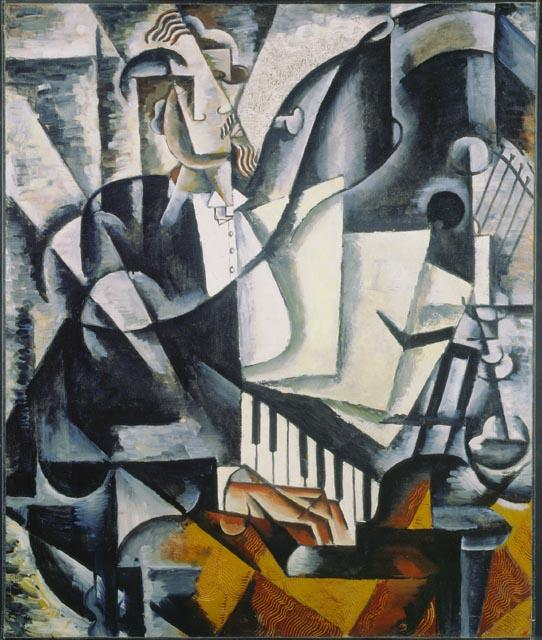
The Pianist, 1914, National Gallery of Canada

Popova was one of the first female pioneers in Cubo-Futurism. Through a synthesis of styles she worked towards what she termed painterly architectonics. After first exploring Impressionism, by 1913, in Composition with Figures, she was experimenting with the particularly Russian development of Cubo-Futurism: a fusion of two equal influences from France and Italy.

From 1914 to 1915 her Moscow home became the meeting-place for artists and writers. In 1914–1916 Popova together with other avant-garde artists (Aleksandra Ekster, Nadezhda Udaltsova, Olga Rozanova) contributed to the two Knave of Diamonds exhibitions, in Petrograd Tramway V and the 0.10, The Store in Moscow. An analysis of Popova's cubo-futurist work also suggests an affinity with the work of Fernand Leger, whose geometry of tubular and conical forms in his series of paintings from 1913 to 1914 is similar to that in Popova's paintings.

=== Suprematism ===
Her painting The Violin of 1914 suggests the development from Cubism towards the "painterly architectonics" series of 1916–1918. This series defined her distinct artistic trajectory in abstract form. The canvas surface is an energy field of overlapping and intersecting angular planes in a constant state of potential release of energy. At the same time the elements are held in a balanced and proportioned whole as if linking the compositions of the classical past to the future. Color is used as the iconic focus; the strong primary color at the center drawing the outer shapes together.

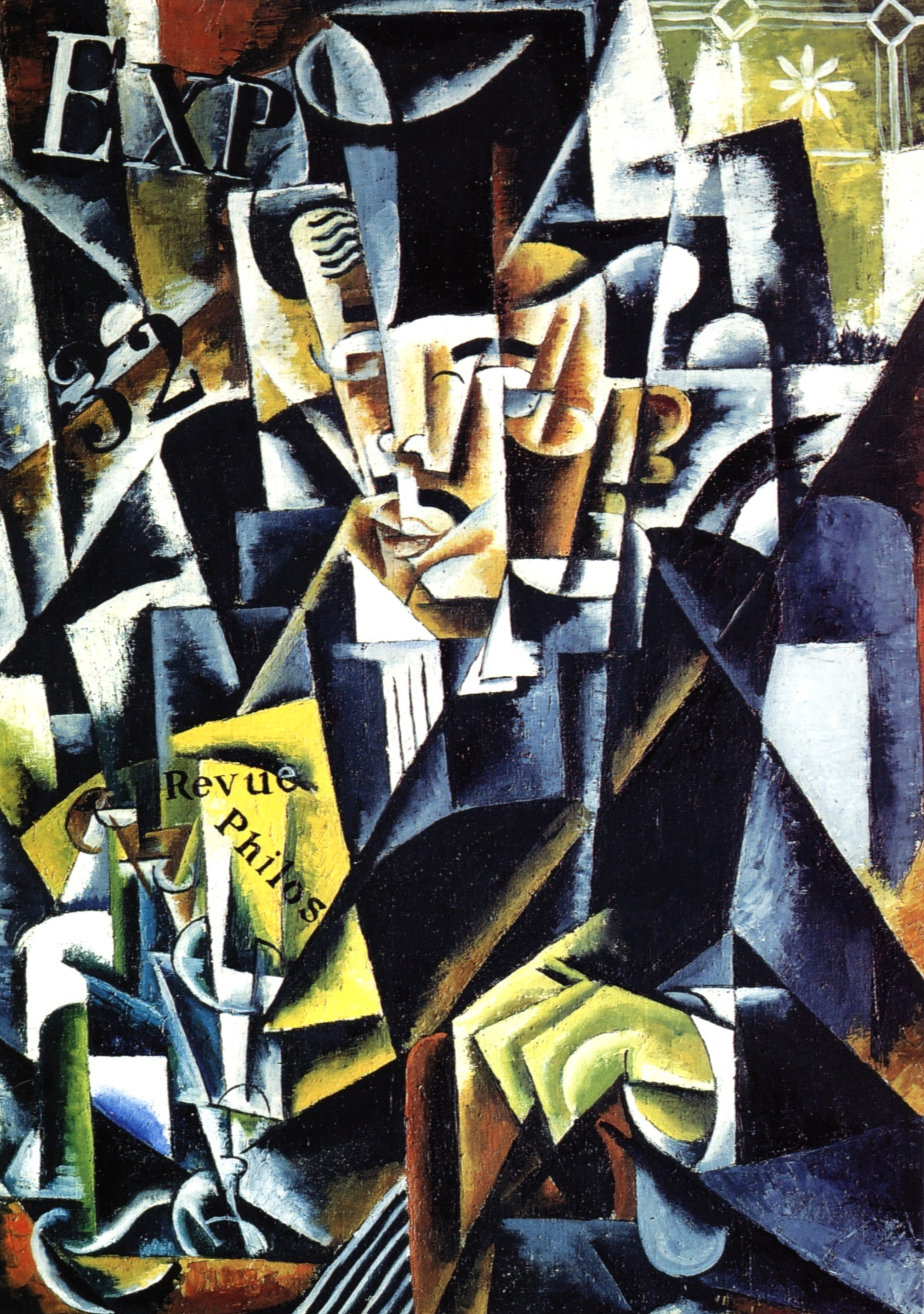
Portrait of a Philosopher (Artist's brother, Pavel Sergeyevich Popov), 1915

In 1916 she joined the Supremus group with Kazimir Malevich, the founder of Suprematism, Aleksandra Ekster, Ivan Kliun, Nadezhda Udaltsova, Olga Rozanova, Ivan Puni, Nina Genke, Ksenia Boguslavskaya and others who at this time worked in Verbovka Village Folk Centre. The creation of a new kind of painting was part of the revolutionary urge of the Russian avant-garde to remake the world. The term 'supreme' refers to a 'non-objective' or abstract world beyond that of everyday reality. However, there was a tension between those who, like Malevich, saw art as a spiritual quest, and others who responded to the need for the artist to create a new physical world. Popova embraced both of these ideals but eventually identified herself entirely with the aims of the Revolution working in poster, book design, fabric and theatre design, as well as teaching. At 0.10 she had exhibited a number of figurative painted cardboard reliefs in a cubist derived style. In 1916 she began to paint completely abstract Suprematist compositions, but the title "Painterly Architectonics" (which she gave to many of her paintings) suggests that, even as a Suprematist, Popova was more interested in painting as a projection of material reality than as the personal expression of a metaphysical reality. Popova's superimposed planes and strong color have the objective presence of actual space and materials.

In 1918 Popova married the art historian Boris von Eding, and gave birth to a son. Von Eding died the following year of typhoid fever. Popova was also seriously ill but recovered.

=== Constructivism ===
As early as 1917, in parallel with her Suprematist work, the artist had made fabric designs and worked on Agitprop books and posters, In the Tenth State Exhibition: Non Objective Creativity and Suprematism, 1918, she contributed the architectonic series of paintings. She continued painting advanced abstract works until 1921. In the 5x5=25 Exhibition of 1921, Popova and her four fellow Constructivists declared that easel painting was to be abandoned and all creative work was to be for the people and the making of the new society. Popova worked in a broad range of mediums and disciplines, including painting, relief, works on paper, and designs for the theater, textiles, and typography. Popova did not join the Working Group of Constructivists when it was set up in Moscow in March 1921, but joined by the end of 1921. In 1923 she began creating designs for fabric to be manufactured by the First State Textile Printing Works in Moscow.

From 1921 to 1924 Popova became entirely involved in Constructivist projects, sometimes in collaboration with Varvara Stepanova, the architect Alexander Vesnin and Alexander Rodchenko. She produced stage designs: Vsevolod Meyerhold's production of Fernand Crommelynck's The Magnanimous Cuckold, 1922; her Spatial Force Constructions were used as the basis of her art teaching theory at Vkhutemas. She designed typography of books, production art and textiles, and contributed designs for dresses to LEF.

She worked briefly in the Cotton Printing Factory in Moscow with Varvara Stepanova.

== Death and legacy ==
Popova died at the peak of her artistic powers two days after the death of her son, from whom she had contracted scarlet fever in 1924 in Moscow. A large exhibition of her work opened in Moscow from 21 December 1924 to January 1925, at Stroganov Institute, Moscow. The exhibition included Popova's works such as seventy-seven paintings, as well as books, posters, textile designs, and line engravings. "Artist-Constructor" was the term applied to Popova by her contemporaries in the catalogue of the artist's posthumous exhibition.

Popova was the subject of an exhibition at the Museo de Arte Abstracto Español, Cuenca (18 February - 23 May 2004) and Museu Fundación Juan March, Palma (4 June - 4 September 2004) of works created from 1910 to 1922 and loaned from the State Tretyakov Gallery in Moscow.

Rodchenko/Popova: Defining Constructivism, an exhibition of the work of Popova, Rodchenko, and other Constructivists was shown at Tate Modern, London, in 2009, and subsequently at Museo Reina Sofia, Madrid.

Popova's work was included in the 2021 exhibition Women in Abstraction at the Centre Pompidou.

== Gallery ==
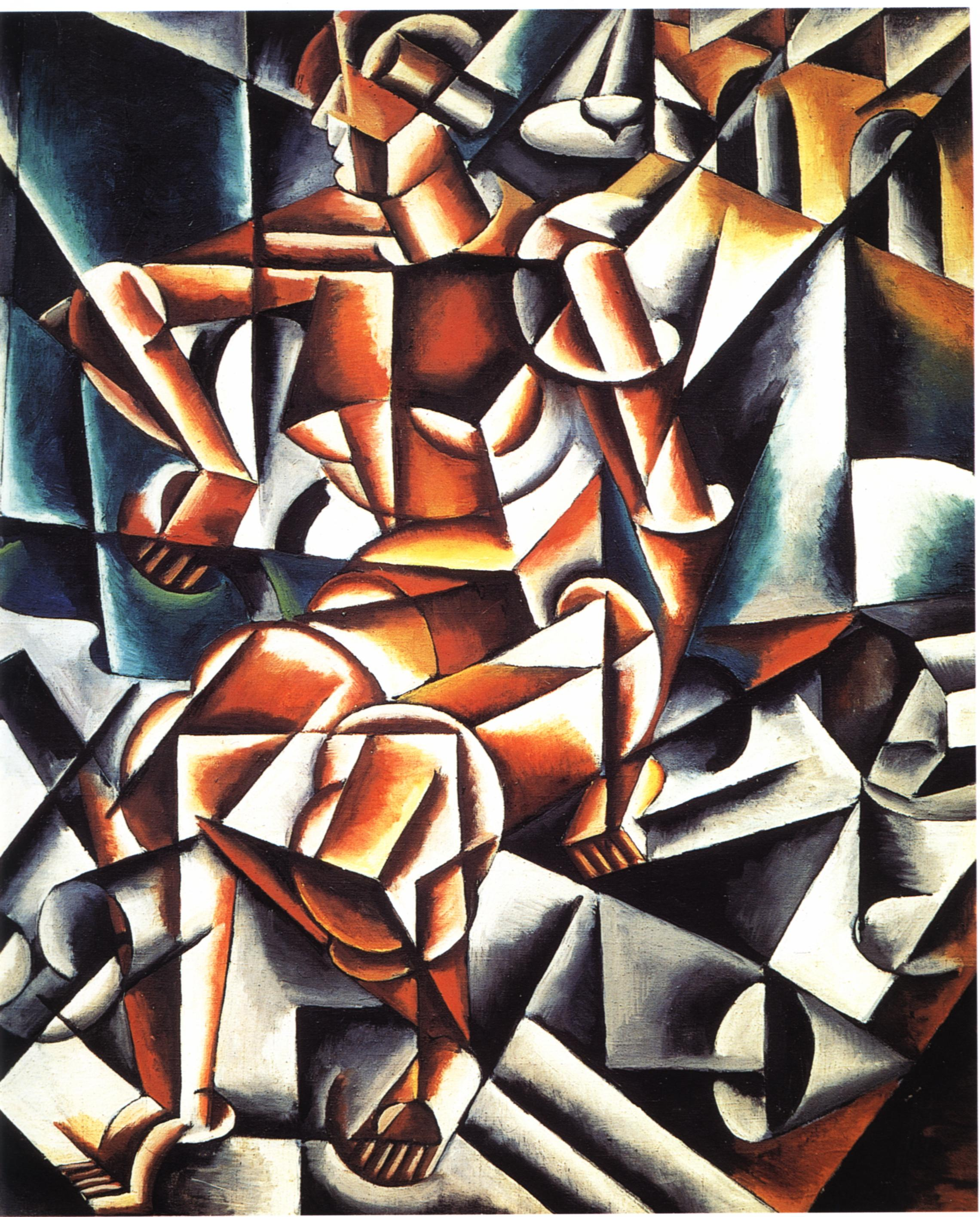
Air+Man+Space, 1912, Oil on canvas, 125 x 107 cm, The State Russian Museum, St. Petersburg

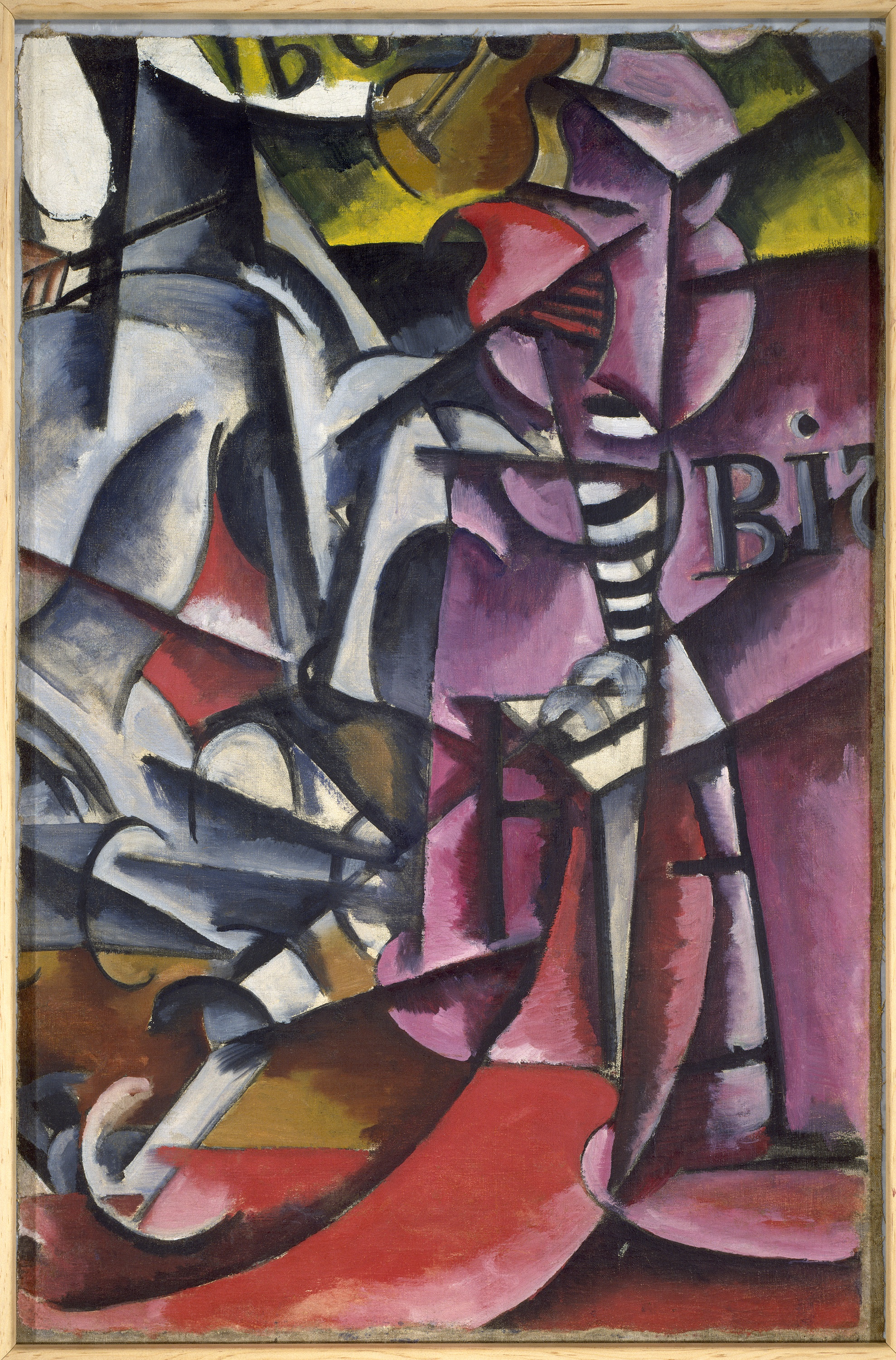
Untitled, 1915, Oil on canvas, 106.4 cm × 71.1 cm (41.9 in × 28.0 in), Solomon R. Guggenheim Museum, New York Gift, George Costakis, 1981 Guggenheim Museum

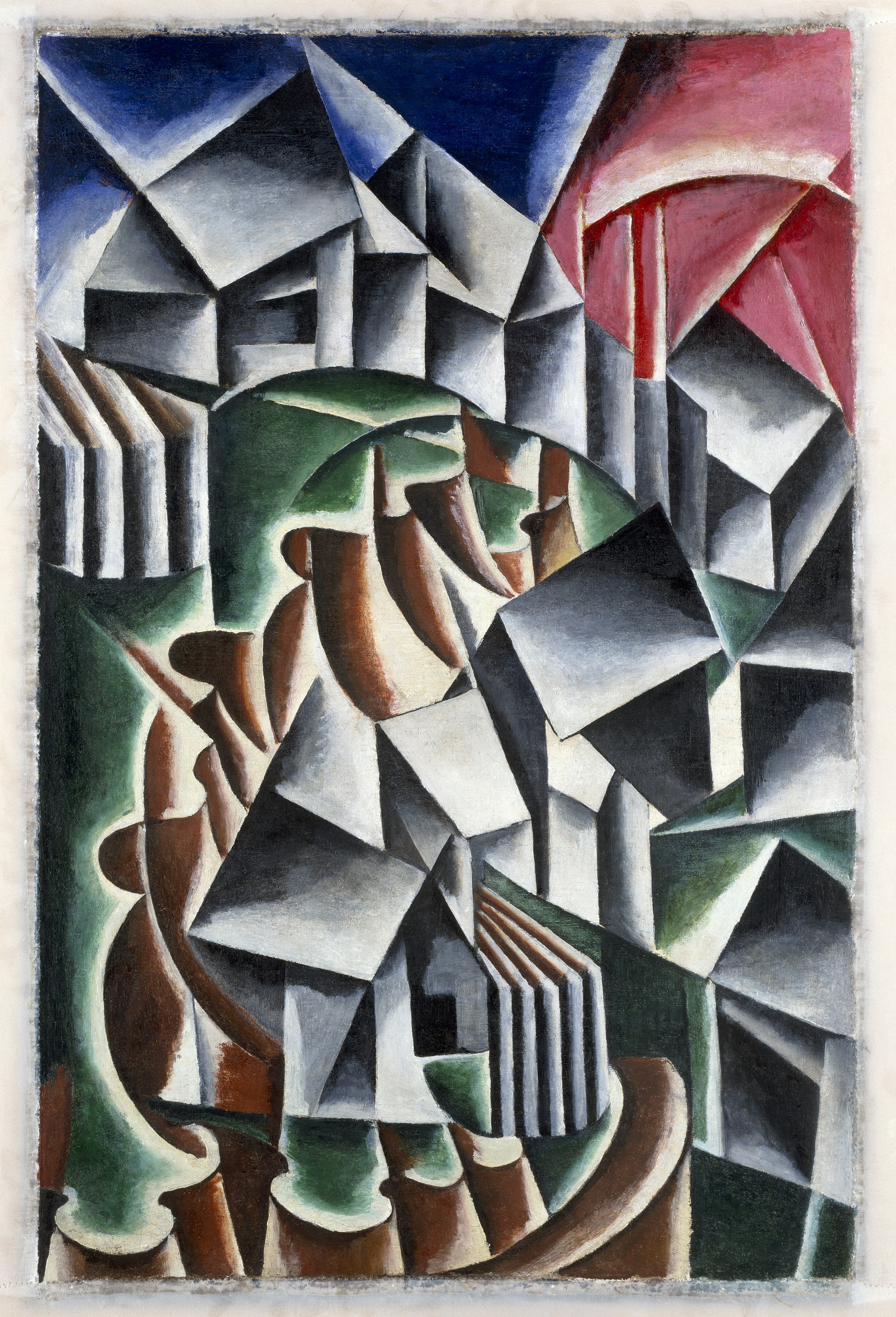
Birsk, 1916, Oil on canvas, 106 cm × 69.5 cm (41.7 in × 27.4 in), Solomon R. Guggenheim Museum, New York Gift, George Costakis, 1981 Guggenheim Museum

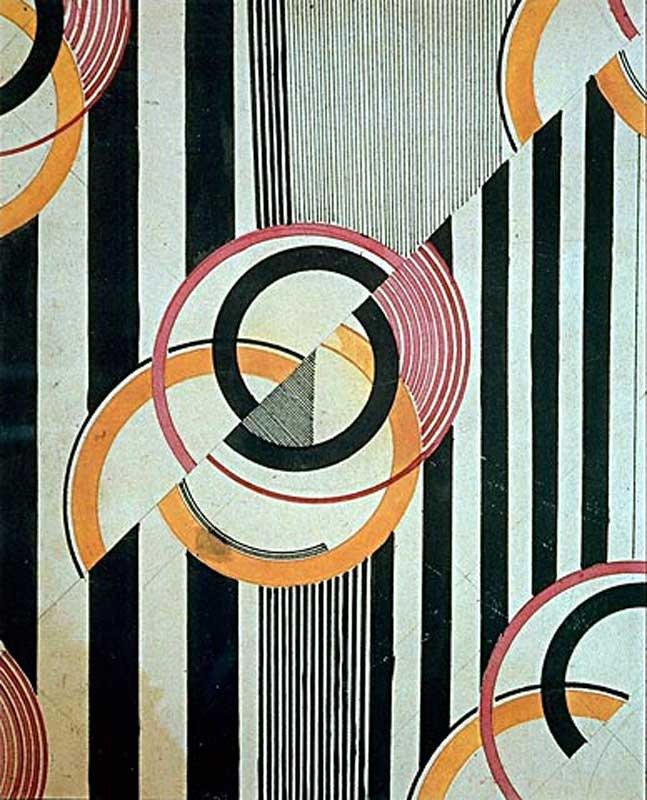
Textile design, c.1924

== See also ==
- List of Russian artists
