= Nina Genke-Meller =

Ukrainian artist (1893–1954)

- Нина Генке-Меллер; Ніна Генке-Меллер
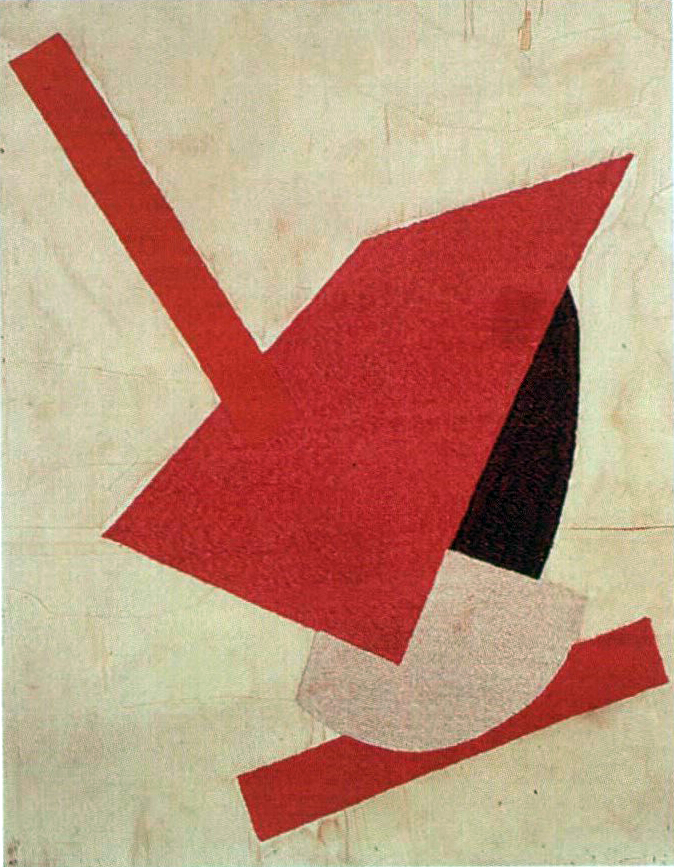
- Suprematist Composition, 1915
- Born: Нина Генриховна Генке; Ніна Генріхівна Генке; Nina Henrikhivna Henke; 19 March [O.S. 7 March] 1893; Moscow, Russian Empire
- Died: 25 July 1954 (aged 61); Kyiv, Ukrainian SSR, USSR (now Ukraine)
- Occupations: Artist; designer; graphic designer; scenographer
- Spouse: Vadym Meller

Nina Henrichovna Genke-Meller (Note: Alternatively spelt Nina Henrichovna Henke-Meller) (née Genke; Russian: Нина Генриховна Генке-Меллер; Ukrainian: Ніна Генріхівна Генке-Меллер, romanized: Nina Henrikhivna Henke-Meller; 19 March [O.S. 7 March] 1893 (Note: Also cited as 19 April 1893) – 25 July 1954) was a Ukrainian-Russian and Soviet artist, designer, graphic designer and scenographer. A member of the Russian avant-garde, Genke-Meller was a representative of the Suprematist and Futurist art movements.

== Early life and education ==
Nina Henrichovna Genke was born on 19 March [O.S. 7 March] 1893 in Moscow, Russian Empire (now Russia) to a Dutch father, August-Henry Henke, and a Russian mother, Nadiya Lvivna Tykhanova. Genke-Meller had one older half-brother, and was the younger sister of the illustrator Margarita Genke-Shifrina.

In 1912, Genke-Meller graduated from Levandovskaya Private Gymnasium in Kyiv, and later received a title to teach Russian language and history.

== Career ==
In 1913, Genke-Meller began teaching history, geography and drawing at the Higher Primary College for Women in Skoptsi. In Skoptsi, she met the artist Yevgenia Pribylska who headed the Art Studio in a Folk Center and became more inspired to become an artist herself. In 1914, Genke-Meller began attending Aleksandra Ekster’s studio in Kyiv for her art education, becoming an assistant in Ekster's studio from 1915 to 1917. At the same time, Genke-Meller worked as an artist in Skoptsi (Skoptsy) Village Folk Centre, supervised by Yevgeniya Pribilskaya and in Verbovka or the Verbovka Village Folk Centre, founded by N. Davidova.

Genke-Meller was closely connected with the Supremus group that was led by Kazimir Malevich, the founder of Suprematism. From 1915, Genke-Meller worked as a head and a chief artist of the Verbovka Village Folk Centre (province in Kyiv). She attracted famous avant-garde artists such as Kazimir Malevich, Nadezhda Udaltsova, Aleksandra Ekster, Ivan Kliun, Ivan Puni, Lyubov Popova, Olga Rozanova, Ksenia Boguslavskaya and others to the creative peasant artisans co-operative. During 1915 to 1916 Genke-Meller participated in the creating settings for the play "Kamira Kifared" (I.F. Annenskiy) for Kamerny Theater in Moscow, was teaching drawing at Kruger's Private Gymnasium, was working jointly on a large panel with artist Katria Vasilieva, as a member of the Kyiv Folk Centre, was one of the heads of the Kyiv Committee of the All-Russian Zemstvo Union: together with the group of artists-suprematists was creating a network of artistic and industrial studios aiming at support of folk art in Ternopil, Kolomiya, Chortkiv and Chernivtsi regions.

Shortly after the October Revolution of 1917, Genke-Meller participated in decorating the streets of Kyiv and Odesa for Revolution Festivities together with Aleksandra Ekster and Kliment Red'ko, and began to design grandiose shows and a book on graphic design. Genke-Meller was the chief artist of panfuturist publishing house Golfshtorm (Ukrainian: Гольфстрим; lit. 'Golfstream'). At the same time she worked as a graphic artist. In 1923, she "illustrated the Panfuturists' October Collection, established a symbiosis between poster and poetry". From 1920 to 1924 she taught art in the All-Ukrainian State Center Studio. In 1924 moved to Moscow, working as a stage designer, designer for china (mostly plates) and wallpaper manufacture. Genke also held a position of the Deputy Head of the Board on Fine Arts in Vserabis.

In 1938, Genke-Meller became a member of the Union of Soviet Artists of Ukraine. In later life, Genke worked as an interior designer, a scenographer, and supervisor of decorative and applied arts institutions.

== Personal life ==
Genke-Meller married the artist Vadym Meller (1884-1962).

On 25 July 1954 Genke-Meller died in Kyiv aged 61. Her daughter Brigitta Vetrova (1930-2020) was the prominent Ukrainian journalist, art critic, best known for her work during the 1970s and 1980s. She played a vital role in preserving the historical legacy of her parents Vadym Meller and Nina Henke-Meller.
