= Supremus =

Russian art group

Supremus (Russian: Супремус; 1915–1916) was a group of Russian avant-garde artists led by the "father" of Suprematism, Kazimir Malevich. It has been described as the first attempt to found the Russian avant-garde movement as an artistic entity within its own historical development.

Supremus conceptualized the artist as one who has freed himself from everything that pre-decided the ideal structure of life and art. Malevich projected the Supremus vision onto Cubism, which he believed deconstructs things and completely changes the reference points of art. To support the movement, Malevich established the journal Supremus (initially titled Nul or Nothing), which received contributions from artists and philosophers. The publication, however, never took off and its first issue was never distributed due to the Russian Revolution.

Members of the group included Aleksandra Ekster, Liubov Popova, Olga Rozanova, Ivan Kliun, Ivan Puni, Nadezhda Udaltsova, Nina Genke-Meller, Ksenia Boguslavskaya and others.

== See also ==
- Suprematism
- Kazimir Malevich
- Russian avant-garde
- Verbovka Village Folk Centre
