= Nadezhda Udaltsova =

Russian artist (1886–1961)

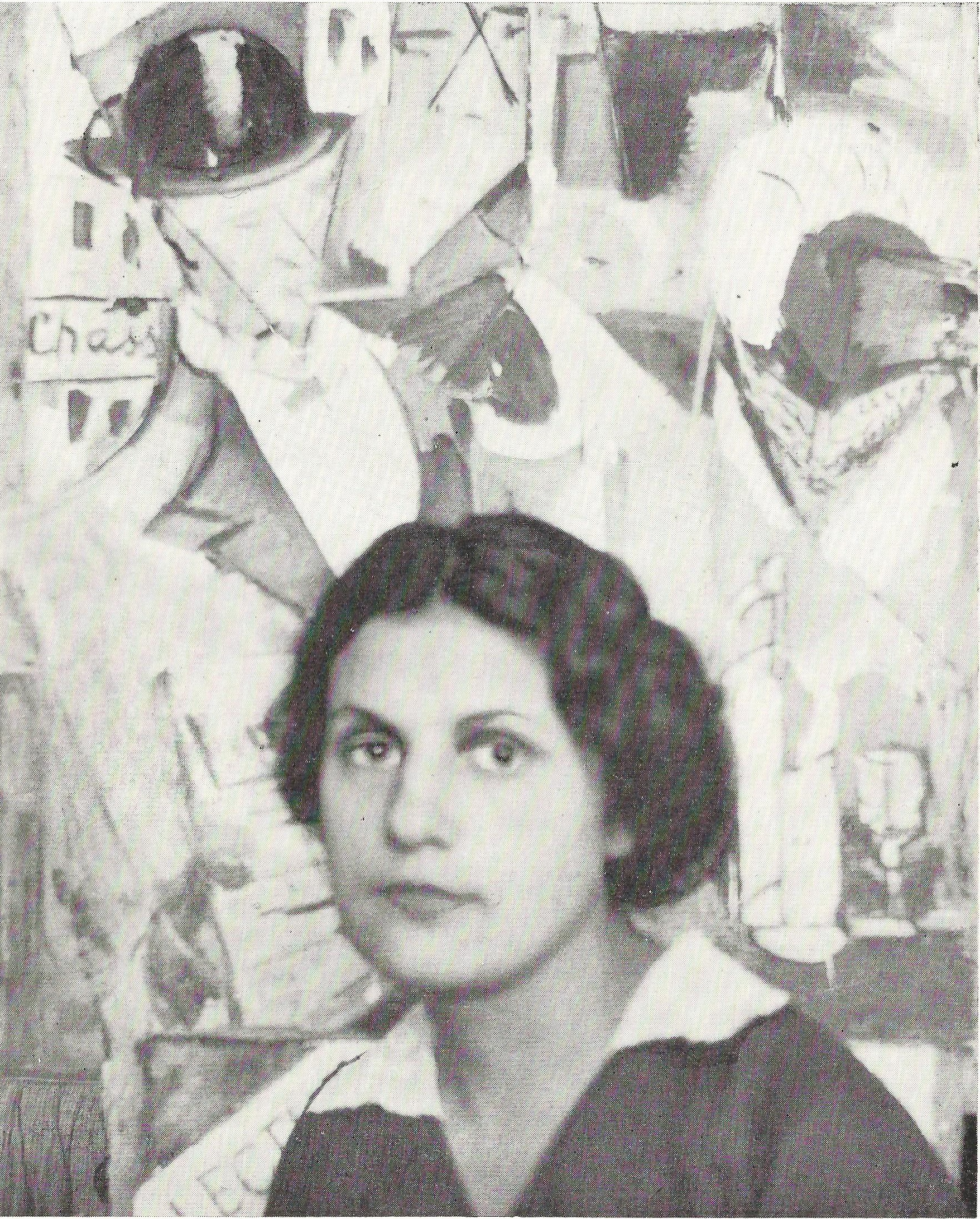
- Udaltsova with the study for the painting The Restaurant, 1915
- Born: Надежда Андреевна Прудковская; Nadezhda Andreevna Prudkovskaia; 29 December 1885 [O.S. 10 January 1886] Orel, Orlovsky Uyezd, Oryol Governorate, Russian Empire (now Russia)
- Died: 25 January 1961 (aged 75); Moscow, Russian SFSR, Soviet Union
- Education: Académie de La Palette, 1913
- Movement: Cubism; Cubo-Futurism; Suprematism; Fauvism
- Spouse(s): Alexander Udaltsov (m. 1908, divorced) Aleksandr Drevin (m. 1919; died 1938)
- Children: Andrey Drevin

Nadezhda Andreevna Udaltsova (née Prudkovskaia; Russian: Наде́жда Андре́евна Удальцо́ва; 29 December 1885 [O.S. 10 January 1886] – 25 January 1961) was a Russian and Soviet artist, painter and teacher. A member of the Russian avant-garde, Udaltsova was a representative of the Cubist, Cubo-Futurism and Suprematist art movements.

== Early life and education ==
Nadezhda Andreevna Prudkovskaia (Russian: Надежда Андреевна Прудковская) was born on 29 December 1885 [O.S. 10 January 1886] in Orel, Orlovsky Uyezd (present-day Oryol Oblast, Russia) to Andrei Timofeevich Prudkovsky, an army general, and Vera Nikolaevna Prudkovsky (née Choglokova). In 1891, aged six, Udaltsova and her family moved to Moscow, where she graduated from high school and began her artistic career. In September 1905 Udaltsova enrolled in the art school run by Konstantin Yuon and Ivan Dudin, where she studied for two years and met fellow-students Vera Mukhina, Liubov Popova, and Aleksander Vesnin. In the spring of 1908 she traveled to Berlin and Dresden, and upon her return to Russia, she unsuccessfully applied for admission to the Moscow Institute of Painting, Sculpture, and Architecture. In 1910–11, Udaltsova studied at several private studios, among them Vladimir Tatlin's. In 1912–13 she and Popova traveled to Paris to continue their studies under the tutelage of Henri Le Fauconnier, Jean Metzinger and André Segonzac at Académie de La Palette. Udaltsova returned to Moscow in 1913 and worked in Vladimir Tatlin's studio together with Popova, Vesnin, and others.

== Career ==
=== Cubism and Cubo-Futurism ===
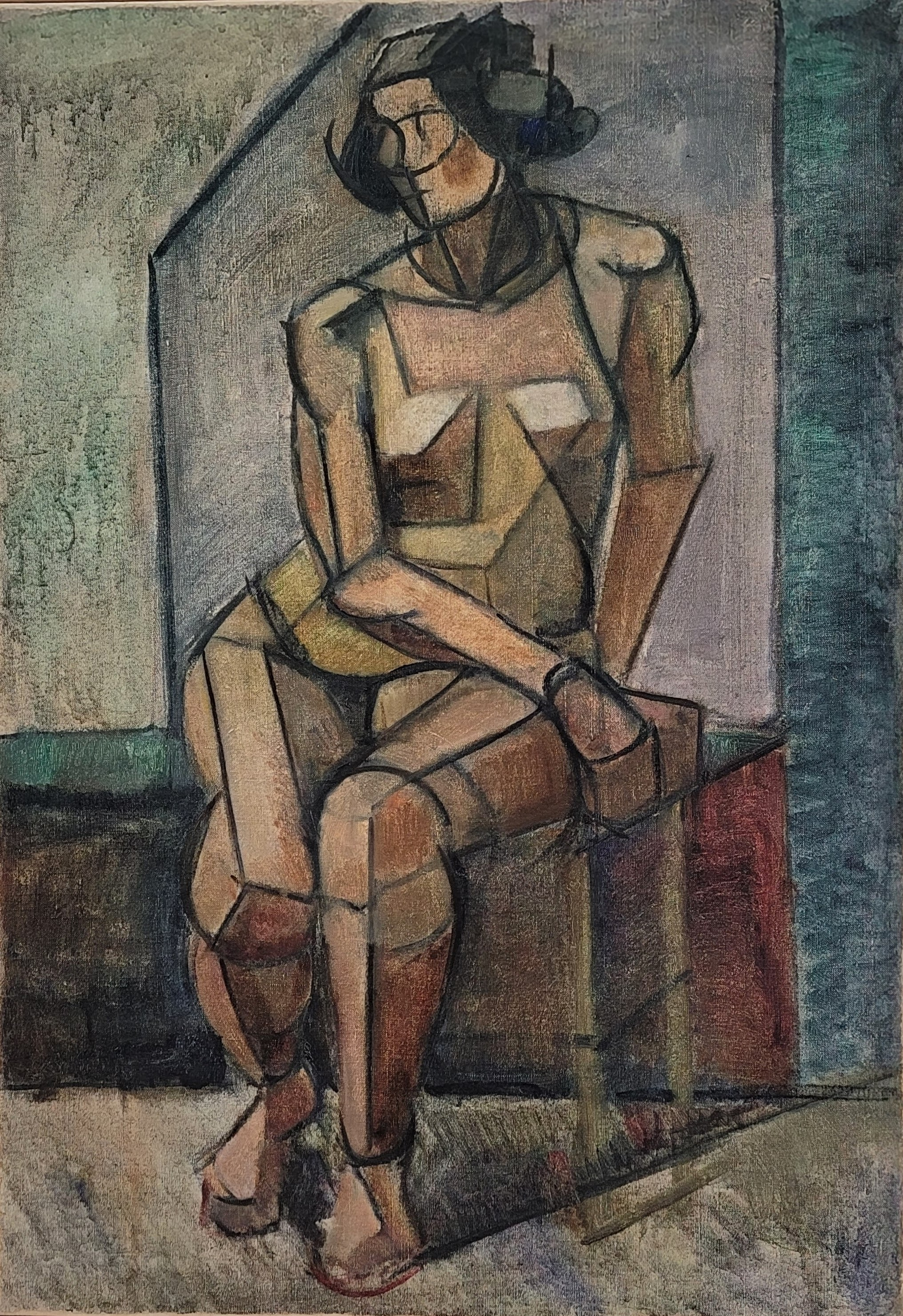
Female nude (1912/1913)

Udaltsova's professional debut was as a participant in a Jack of Diamonds exhibition in Moscow in the winter of 1914. But it was in 1915 that she really made her name as a Cubist artist, participating in three major exhibitions in that single year, including "Tramway V" (February), "Exhibition of Leftist Tendencies" (April), and "The Last Futurist Exhibition: 0.10" (December). Her paintings were subsequently collected and exhibited in the 1920s by the Tretiakov Gallery, the Russian Museum, and other venues as examples of Cubo-Futurism.

=== Suprematism ===
Under the influence of Tatlin, Udaltsova experimented with Constructivism, but eventually embraced the more painterly approach of the Suprematist movement. In 1916, she participated with other Suprematist artists in a Jack of Diamonds exhibition, and during that same time period she joined Kazimir Malevich's Supremus group. In 1915–1916, together with other suprematist artists (Kazimir Malevich, Aleksandra Ekster, Liubov Popova, Nina Genke, Olga Rozanova, Ivan Kliun, Ivan Puni, Ksenia Boguslavskaya and others) worked at the Verbovka Village Folk Centre.

=== Revolution ===
Like many of her avant-garde contemporaries, Udaltsova embraced the October Revolution. In 1917, she was elected to the Club of the Young Leftist Federation of the Professional Union of Artists and Painters and began work in various state cultural institutions, including the Moscow Proletkult. In 1918, she joined the Free State Studios, first working as Malevich's assistant, and then heading up her own studio. She also collaborated with Aleksei Gan, Aleksei Morgunov, Aleksandr Rodchenko and Malevich on a newspaper entitled Anarkhiia (Anarchy). In 1919, Udaltsova contributed eleven works from the time she was working in Tatlin's studio to the "Fifth State Exhibition." When Vkhutemas, the Russian state art and technical school, was established in 1920, she was appointed professor and senior lecturer and would remain on staff until 1934. In 1920 she also became a member of the Institute of Artistic Culture (InKhuK) and actively participated in discussions there on the fate of easel art. However, when the Institute endorsed Constructivism and declared the end of easel painting, she resigned her membership in protest in 1921. In 1922 she participated in the First Russian Art Exhibition in Berlin.

=== Fauvism and a return to the figurative ===
In the early 1920s, Udaltsova's work began to show a turn away from the radical avant-garde and a sensibility more aligned with artists associated with the Jack of Diamonds, among them Ilya Mashkov, Petr Konchalovsky and Aristarkh Lentulov, exhibiting her Fauvist portraits and landscapes alongside them at the Vkhutemas "Exhibition of Paintings" of 1923 and also at the Venice "Biennale" of 1924. She also continued to teach, including instruction in textile design at Vhkutemas and the Textile Institute in Moscow from 1920 until 1930.

Under the influence of Drevin, Udaltsova returned to nature and began painting landscapes. Between 1926 and 1934 they traveled widely, painting the Ural and Altai Mountains, as well as landscapes in Armenia and Central Asia. From 1927 to 1935, she contributed to national and international exhibitions and participated with Drevin in joint exhibitions at the Russian Museum (1928) and in Erevan, Armenia (1934).

In 1933, Udaltsova's contributions to the exhibition of "Artists of the RSFSR Over the Last Fifteen Years" was publicly criticized for so-called "formalist tendencies."

== Repression ==
On 17 January 1938, Udaltsova's husband Aleksandr Drevin was arrested by the NKVD as part of the Great Purge Latvian Operation. Drevin was executed in on 26 February 1938. Udaltsova became blacklisted from the Soviet art world.

In 1945, Udaltsova was allowed a solo show at the Moscow Union of Soviet Artists. Following Stalin's death, Udaltsova contributed to a group exhibition at Moscow's House of the Artist in October 1958.

== Personal life ==
In 1908, Udaltsova married the historian Alexander Udaltsov but later divorced. In 1919, Udaltsova married the Latvian painter Aleksandr Drevin. Udaltsova and Drevin had one son, the sculptor Andrei Drevin.

On 25 January 1961 Udaltsova died in Moscow aged 75.

== Legacy ==
The Udaltsova crater on Venus is named after her.
