= Tishler =

Tishler is a German-language occupational surname. It means cabinetmaker or joiner in German and Yiddish and is found among both Germans and Ashkenazi Jews. A variant of Tischler, and Carpenter. Notable people with the surname include:

- Adair Tishler (born 1996), American actress
- Asher Tishler (born 1947), Israeli economist; president of the College of Management Academic Studies
- Max Tishler (1906–1989), scientist at Merck & Co.
- Peter Verveer Tishler (born 1937)
- Matthew Tishler, Canadian songwriter
- Harold Tishler (1893–1993), Russian artist
