= Verbovka Village Folk Centre =

20th-century Ukrainian art collective

Verbovka or Verbovka Village Folk Center was an artisan cooperative in the village of Verbovka founded by Natalia Davidova in the Ukrainian province of Kyiv. Natalia Davidova, one of the founders and the head of the Kyiv Folk Center, was an Avant-garde artist descended from the ancient Ukrainian Hudim-Levkovichis family (Russian philosopher Nikolai Berdyaev was her cousin and artist Nina Genke-Meller was his sister-in-law). The beginning of the cooperation of Natalia Davidova and Nina Genke-Meller originated not just from their family relations. They both were keen on folk art and were devoted to the idea of implementation of Avant-garde artistic principles into practice of amateur goods. In 1915 Nina Genke became a head and chief artist of Natalia's Davidova Folk Center in Verbovka village. N.Davidova involved Nina Genke in "promoting " folk thing's production in accordance with the sketchers of famous Avant-garde artists. The members of the Supremus group started to cooperate very actively. Between 1915 and 1916 many Suprematist artists such as Kazimir Malevich, Aleksandra Ekster, Nina Genke-Meller, Nadezhda Udaltsova, Liubov Popova, Olga Rozanova, Ivan Puni, Ksenia Boguslavskaya, Ivan Kliun and others worked with peasant artisans at the cooperative. In November 1915 N.Davidova, together with A.Ekster and N.Genke, arranged an Exhibition of Modern Decorative Art of the South of Russia in Lamersie Moscow Gallery. There they represented the village ladies' works who studied decorative art in Verbovka and Skoptsi's schools, as well as carpets, pillows, shawls and belts made in accordance with sketches of Popova, Malevich, Davidova, Genke, Ekster, Puni, Kliun, Pribilskaya, Yakulov, Rozanova, Vasilieva, Boguslavskaya and others. The exhibition received broad publicity in the press. In 1917 Davidova and Genke arranged the Second Exhibition of Modern Decorative Art in Moscow in Mikhailava's Saloon.

== See also ==
- Suprematism
