= Paul Mansouroff =

Russian painter

- Born: Paul Andréevitch Mansouroff; 1896; Saint Petersburg of Russian Empire
- Died: 2 February 1983 (aged 86–87); Nice, France
- Known for: Painting
- Movement: Suprematism

Paul Andréevitch Mansouroff or Pavel Mansurov (Павел Мансуров) (1896 in Saint-Petersburg – 2 February 1983 in Nice, France) was an understated painter of the Russian avant-garde movement of the 1920s. Mansouroff's contribution to the avant-garde in Russia was a wholly non-objective art that used elongated vertical surfaces to explore questions of space and spatial correlations.

« My works have no subject and are exclusively abstract, and if something can be identified, it is only the result of pure coincidence.» Mansouroff, Galerie Daniel Gervis, 1968.

Influenced by his friends, Malevich and Tatlin, Mansouroff made his first public exhibit of his abstract work in 1918 at Winter Palace in Leningrad. However, Mansouroff quickly moved away from the influence of his entourage and developed a more personal and instinctive style.

Mansouroff is known for his paintings on wood, referred to as “Pictural formulae.”

In the 1950s, he started making frequent trips to Nice and Saint-Paul de Vence. He settled there in 1975 and died in Nice on 2 February 1983.
