= Solomon Nikritin =

Ukrainian painter, avant-garde artist, philosopher, and author

Solomon Nikritin (Ukrainian: Соломон Борисовiч Нiкрiтiн; 1898–1965) was a Ukrainian painter, avant-garde artist ( Neo-Primitivist, Constructivist), philosopher, and author.

== Biography ==
Solomon Nikritin was born in Chernihiv, Ukraine (then part of the Russian Empire). In 1909–1914 he attended Kiev Art School (KKHU). He had also trained with Aleksandra Exeter during the Civil War before he went to Vkhutemas. By 1916, he was associated with KKHU faculty's informal group of young artists, including Alexander Tyshler, Mark Epstein, and Isaac Rabinovich. This group attempted to identify a modern Jewish culture.

In 1914–1917 he studied under the painters Leonid Pasternak and Alexander Jakovlev in Moscow and in St. Petersburg.

In 1916 he participated in an exhibition of contemporary art in Moscow.

In 1917 Nikritin returned to Kiev and studied in the studio of Aleksandra Ekster.

In 1920-1922 he studied at the Moscow Higher Artistic-Technical Workshops (VKhUTEMAS).

In 1922 Nikritin participated in the First Russian Art Exhibition in the Gallery van Diemen in Berlin together with Kazimir Malevich, Alexander Archipenko, Aleksandra Ekster, El Lissitzky, Nathan Altman and others.

In 1922 he participated in the founding of the group, the Projectionists, together with Kliment Red'ko and Tishler among others.

From 1923 to 1924 he together with Red'ko developed theories of Electroorganism and Luminism.

In 1923 Nikritin was co-founder of the experimental stage, Theatre of Projectionism in Moscow.

From 1929 to 1930 he taught at the high school for art education in Riazan.

He was a head of the Poly-Technical Museum in Moscow.

From 1931 he was a member of the association Isobrigade.

Nikritin died in Moscow.

== Works ==
Sometime in the 1920s, Nikritin attempted to develop a typology and classification of human voices, movements, gestures, emotions, sounds, and colors according to the principles and terms of biomechanics, musical harmony, and acoustics. It formed part of his pioneering system of training for actors.
