= Verbivtsi =

Verbivtsi (Ukrainian: Вербівці) may refer to the following places in Ukraine:

- Verbivtsi, Chernivtsi Oblast, village in Chernivtsi Raion, Chernivtsi Oblast
- Verbivtsi, Terebovlia urban hromada, Ternopil Raion, Ternopil Oblast
