= Tischler =

Tischler is a German-language occupational surname. It means cabinetmaker or joiner in German and Yiddish and is found among both Germans and Ashkenazi Jews. A variant is Tishler.

Notable people with this surname include:

- Bluma Tischler, physician
- Bob Tischler, television producer
- Emil Tischler, Czech footballer
- Friedrich Tischler, ornithologist
- Georg Tischler, athlete
- Hans Tischler (1915 - 2010), American musicologist and composer
- Heike Tischler, athlete
- Joyce Tischler, co-founder of the Animal Legal Defense Fund
- Matthias M. Tischler, historian
- Maya Tischler (born 1996), German politician
- Nik Tischler, bassist with You Am I
- Patrick Tischler, athlete
- Patrik Tischler, athlete
- Randy Tischler, hacker better known as "Taran King"
- Stanford Tischler (1921-2014), American filmmaker
