= Harold Tishler =

Ukrainian artist

- Born: 1893; Odesa, Ukraine
- Died: 1993 (aged 99–100)
- Education: Kunstgewerbeschule
- Known for: Enamel

Harold Tishler (1893–1993) was an artist.

== Biography ==
Tishler was born in Odesa, Ukraine, which was then part of the Empire of Russia. He studied art in high school and in 1910 began to study Engineering at the University of Grenoble. He moved to New York in 1913 and later joined the Army from 1917 to 1922. He was exposed to cloisonné in Hong Kong which stoked a lifelong career in the art of enameling.

Tishler spent 1927 to 1932, in Vienna to study at the Kunstgewerbeschule. During his time in Vienna he studied with Michael Powolny and Josef Hoffmann as well as Edward Winter. Harold returned to New York in 1932 and produced high end goods and teach at the New School for Social Research. In 1935 Tishler visited Winter in Cleveland and was introduced to Winter’s enameling method, where the metal is dipped into liquid enamel leading to a more uniform coating. Tishler moved with his wife Sadye to Florida in 1969. He began to focus on fauna and flora over he is previous abstract work. He continued to work in enamel until is death in 1993.
