= Kliment Red'ko =

Russian painter

Kliment Nikolayevich Red'ko
- Born: 15 September 1897; Kholm, Russian Empire
- Died: 18 February 1956 (aged 58); Moscow, Soviet Union
- Known for: Painting, Graphics
- Movement: Realism

Kliment Nikolaevich Red'ko or Redko (Russian: Климент Николаевич Редько, Ukrainian: Климент Миколайович Редько, Klyment Mykolayovych Redko), 15 (27) October 1897 - 18 February 1956) was a Ukrainian-Russian painter-scientist, avant-garde artist (Constructivist, Projectionist, Suprematist), graphic artist.

== Biography ==
Kliment Red'ko was born in Kholm, Russian Empire (now Chełm, Poland).

In 1910–14 he studied at the Icon Painting School of the Kiev Pechersk Lavra.

In 1918–19 he studied at Kiev Art Academy (KKHI).

In 1919–20 Red'ko studied in the studio of Aleksandra Ekster along with students Solomon Nikritin and Nina Genke-Meller. During that time he participated in decorating the streets of Kiev and Odessa for Revolution festivities, in the abstract style together with Ekster and Genke-Meller.

In 1920–22 he studied painting at the Moscow Higher Artistic-Technical Workshops (VKhUTEMAS) in the class of Wassily Kandinsky.

In 1922 he participated in an exhibition of the Museum of Painterly Culture (MSCHK) in Moscow, together with Kazimir Malevich, Nikritin and Alexander Tyshler. In the same year Red'ko wrote the Manifesto of Electroorganism.

From 1923 to 1924 Red'ko, together with Nikritin, developed his theories of Electroorganism and Luminism. Red'ko started a scientific trend in art which he named Electroorganism as a reaction to Constructivism.

In 1926 he had a solo exhibition in Moscow.

In 1928–30 he had solo exhibitions in Paris.

In 1933 he had personal exhibition in Moscow.

In 1941 he worked on the design of posters for the news agency TASS.

Red'ko died in Moscow.
