= Ivan Kliun =

Russian painter (1873–1943)

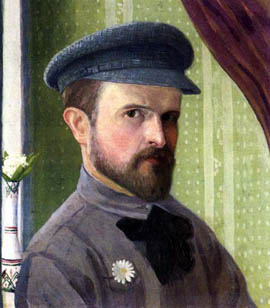
Self-portrait (before 1903)

Ivan Vasilievich Kliun, or Klyun, born Klyunkov (Russian: Иван Васильевич Клюн; 1 September 1873, in Bolshiye Gorky, Petushinsky District – 13 December 1943, in Moscow) was a Russian Avant-Garde painter, sculptor and art theorist, associated with the Suprematist movement.

== Biography ==
His father was a carpenter. In 1881, seeking to improve their economic condition, the family moved to Kyiv. In 1890, they moved again, to Russian Poland. He received his initial artistic education at the Society for the Encouragement of the Fine Arts in Warsaw, in the 1890s, while working as an accountant. In 1898, he relocated to Moscow, where he frequented the studios of Fyodor Rerberg and Ilya Mashkov.

His most important contact, however, came in 1907 when he met Kazimir Malevich and was introduced to the Russian Avant-Garde. This influenced him profoundly, although he joined the Moscow Salon when it was created in 1910 and remained a member until 1916. He originally worked in the Symboloist style but, in 1913, due to the influence of Malevich, he began exhibiting with a group from St. Petersburg known as the "Soyuz Molodyozhi" (Union of Youth). At this time, he became fond of Cubo-Futurism, began producing sculpture (under the influence of Vladimir Tatlin and later exhibited with several other Avant-Garde groups.

In 1915, he provided lithographs and a short chapter for the book, Тайные пороки академиков (The Secret Vices of Academicians) by the poet Aleksei Kruchyonykh. The book was a harsh criticism of Symbolism and decadence in general. That same year he became a follower of Malevich's Suprematism and, the following year, joined his group known as Supremus. While there, he helped prepare a manifesto and a journal that was never published. He also collaborated with the Verbovka Village Folk Centre; working with peasant artisans.

From 1918 to 1921, he was a professor at Vkhutemas, the state art and technical school. From 1920, he was a member of Inkhuk (the Institute of Artistic Culture) and, after 1921, a Corresponding Member of GAHN (State Academy of Art Sciences).

Until the mid-1920s, his works were largely geometric forms. In the late 1920s, he developed an interest in modern Western European art, especially the French; copying works by Picasso and Braque. He was especially attracted to the works of Amédée Ozenfant. In the early 1930s, he created numerous still-lifes in the Purist style. From the mid-1930s on he, and most Soviet artists, were compelled to paint works of Social Realism. In response, he created realistic still lifes and landscapes and gave them away to friends and family

== Selected paintings ==
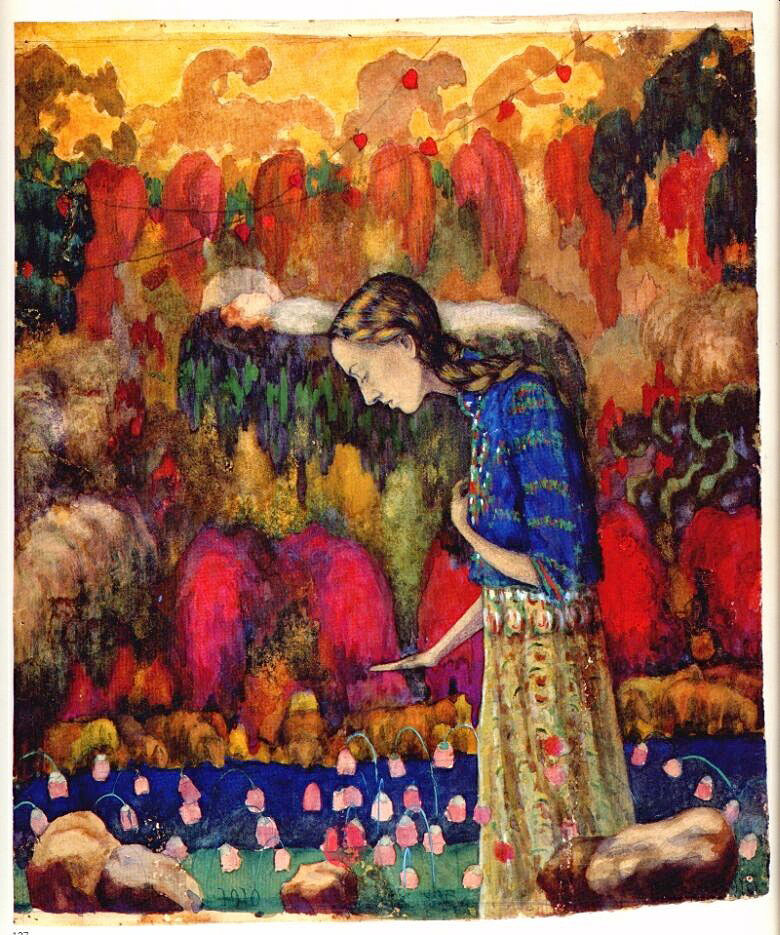
Portrait of the Artist's Wife (1910)

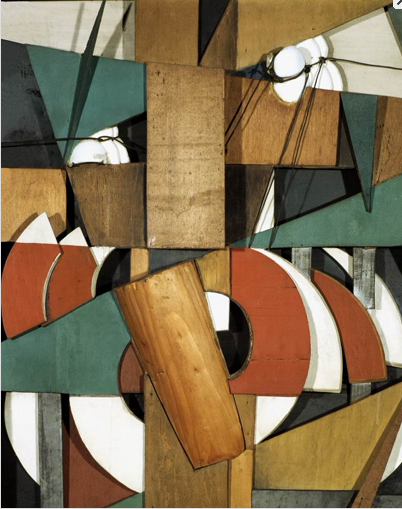
Landscape Rushing By (before 1915)

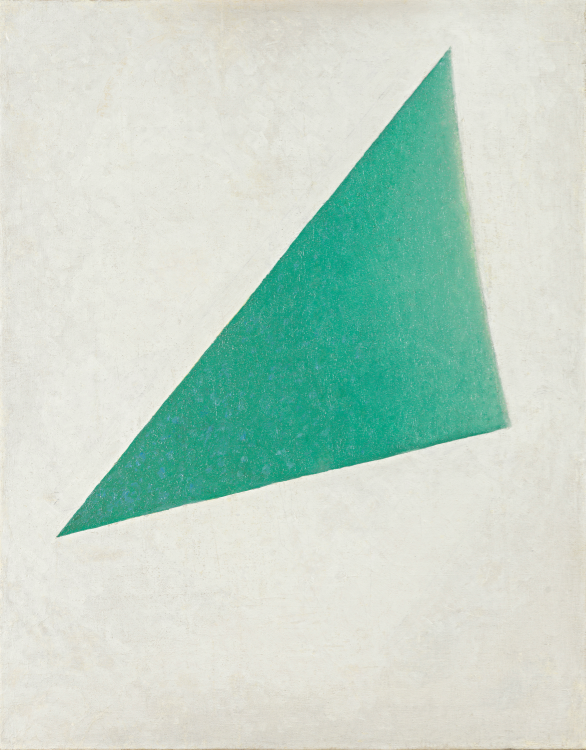
Composition (1917)

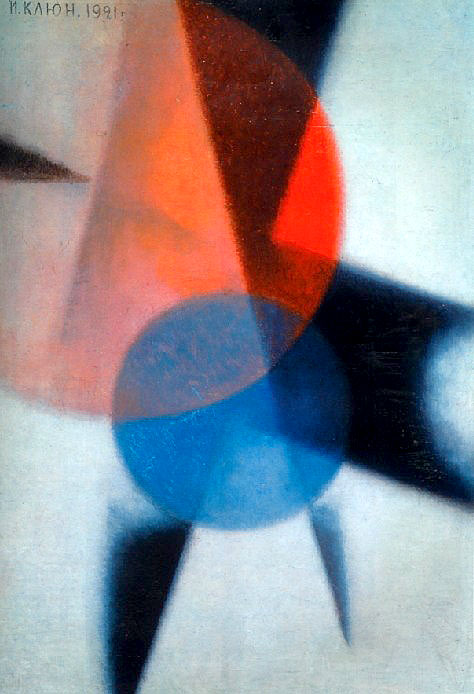
Non-objective based on the light-color principle (1921)

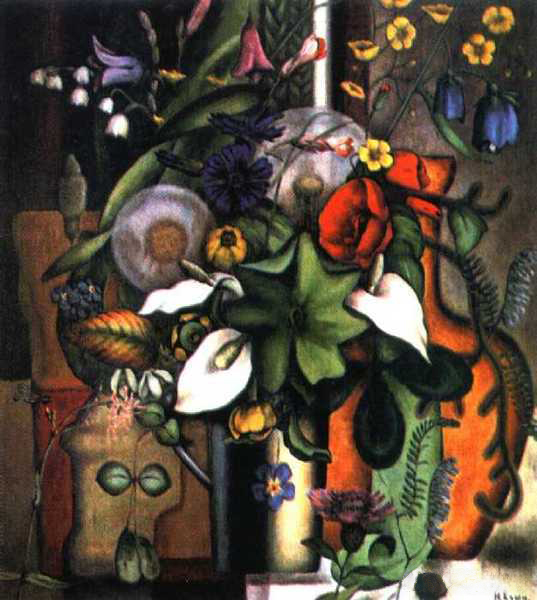
Still-life with Flowers and a Jug (1929)

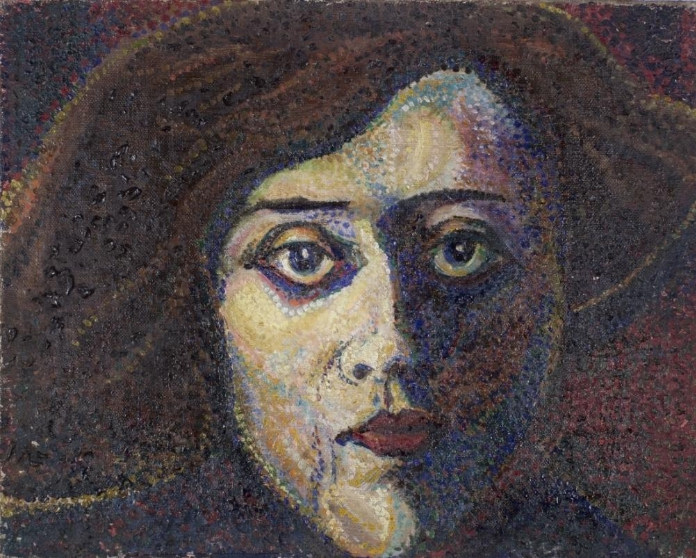
Ivan Kliun Female Portrait (1909–1910)
