= Vera Ermolaeva =

Russian artist (1893–1937)

Vera Ermolaeva (Russian: Ве́ра Миха́йловна Ермола́ева) (November 2, 1893 – September 26, 1937) was a Russian painter, graphic artist and illustrator who participated in the Russian avant-garde movement.

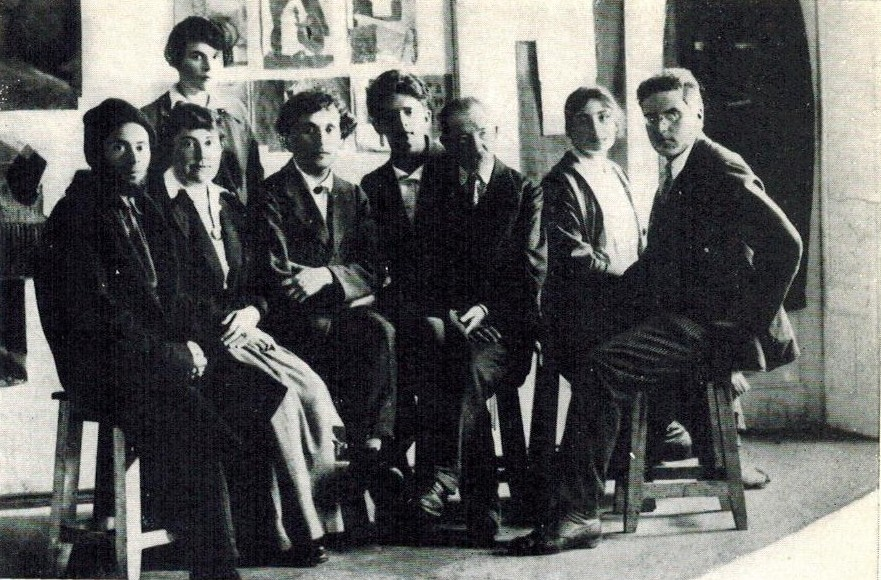
Professors at the People's Art School in Vitebsk, July 26, 1919. From left to right: Lazar Lissitzky, Vera Ermolaeva, Marc Chagall, David Iakerson, Iouri Pen, Nina Kogan, Alexandre Romm.

== Biography ==
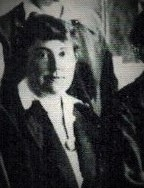
Vera Ermolaeva in Vitebsk, 1919

=== Childhood and early life ===
Vera Mikhailovna Ermolaeva was born on November 2, 1893, in the village of Kliuchi in the Petrovsk uyezd of the Saratov Oblast (now – the Maloserdobinsky District of the Penza Oblast). Her father, Mikahil Sergeevich Ermolaev (1847-1911), was a landowner and served as chairman of the zemstvo county government. He also established a cooperative society called “The Labor Society,” and published a liberal journal called “Zhizn’” (Life) (1899 - 1901), in which writings by Lenin, Gorky, and others appeared. Her mother, Anna Vladimirovna, was born the Baroness of Ungern-Unkovskaia (1854 - ?).

As a child, Ermolaeva fell from a horse, an accident which crippled her legs and left her unable to walk without the aid of crutches. In 1902-3, her family traveled to Europe, where her parents consulted doctors about their daughter's condition. Ermolaeva studied in various schools in Paris, London, and Lausanne.

In 1904, the family returned to Russia. In 1905, Ermolaeva's father sold his estate, and the family moved to St. Petersburg.

From 1906 - 1911, Vera studied at the Princess A. A. Obolenskaia Gymnasium in St. Petersburg.

In 1912, her older brother, who had become involved with the Mensheviks, was arrested by the Tsarist government and exiled to an area near Irkutsk.

=== Artistic education and early adulthood ===
From 1911 to 1913, she studied in the studio of Mikhail D. Bernshtein and Leonid Shervud, where she became interested in Cubism and Futurism and became acquainted with many artists, including Vladimir Tatlin, K. Rozhdestvenskii, Mikhail Le-Dantyu (1891-1917), Nikolai Lapshin, Vladimir Lebedev, V. Kozlinskii, E. Turova, N. Liubovina, S. Lebedeva, Viktor Shklovskii, and Ilia Zdanevich. While at the studio, she designed the set for Zdanevich’s play, “Yanko 1” (1916).

In 1914, she traveled to Paris to study the painting of contemporary artists, but had to return to Russia due to the start of the First World War.

In 1915–16, along with Nikolai Lapshin, who would later become one of the founders of the Russian school of book illustration, she became a member of the futurist circle, “Bloodless Murder” (Beskrovnoe ubiistvo). The members of this circle published a journal by the same name.

In 1915, an exhibition of the work of Mikhail Le-Dantyu was held at Ermolaeva's apartment.

In 1917, she graduated from the Archaeological Institute in St. Petersburg.

She was interested in religious and folk art, including icons, lubki (plural of lubok), painted signs, etc.

Around this time, she became a member of the artists’ collective “Freedom for Art” (Svoboda iskusstvu) and “Art and Revolution” (Iskusstvo i Revoliutsiya).

In 1918–19, she worked in the Petrograd City Museum. She donated her collection of painted shop signboards to the museum and published an article about them called “Peterburgskie vyveski” (Petersburg Shop Signboards) in the journal, Iskusstvo kommuny, on January 26, 1919. This article has been translated into English and published in A. Povelikhina and Ye. Kovtun, Russian Painted Shop Signs and Avant-garde Artists (Leningrad, 1991), pp. 191–2.

She lived in an apartment on Basseinaia St., where artists and poets gathered. Maksim Gorky and Vladimir Mayakovsky both visited the apartment.

She became associated with the group “Soiuz molodezhi.” Her acquaintance with Malevich become important to her artistic development.

After the revolution, Ermolaeva participated in competitions sponsored by the Visual Arts Department (IZO) of the People's Commissariat of Education (Narkompros) and experimented with working as an artist in the theater. In 1920, she created set designs for the futurist opera “Victory over the Sun” (Pobeda nad solntsem) by Mikhail Matyushin and Aleksei Kruchenykh. In 1922 these sets were exhibited in Berlin. The Museum of Modern Art (MOMA) owns an example of one of her designs for the set entitled "Design for Victory Over the Sun."

She also designed the sets for War and Peace (Voina i mir) by Vladimir Mayakovsky.

=== Book illustration ===
In 1918, Ermolaeva became a founding member of the book-publishing studio “Today” (Segodnya) in Petrograd. The studio published small runs of lubki (plural of lubok) and picture-books, created primarily by hand. This studio included the artists N. Lapshin, Yu. Annenkov, N. Altman, N. Lyubavina, and Ye. Turova. Ermolaeva's illustrations for Segodnya publications include three works by Natan Vengrov (Myshata, Petukh, and Segodnia), all published in 1918. She also illustrated Pionery (1918), a Russian translation of a poem by Walt Whitman. The studio produced 13 publications.

Beginning in 1925, Ermolaeva created illustrations for children's books while working at DETGIZ, the Children's Division of the State Publishing House. She illustrated such books as “Top-top-top” (1925) by Nikolai Aseev, “Mnogo zverei” and “Rybaki” by Alexander Vvedensky, "Poezd" by Evgeny Schwartz (1929), “10 fokusov Chudodeeva“ (1929) by M. Il’in, "Ivan Ivanych Samovar” by Daniil Kharms (1930) and many others.

From 1929 to 1931, she illustrated a series of 12 books based on Ivan Krylov’s fables. These books include "Dve sobaki (Two Dogs)" and "Lzhets (The Liar)".

Ermolaeva also created children's books for which she both wrote the text and created the illustrations. These include: “Vnizu po Nilu” and “Sobachki (Doggies).”

With Iudin, she created a new type of picture book for children. These include: “Kto kogo?” and “Bumaga i nozhnitsy.”

Examples of Ermolaeva's book illustrations can be found in libraries and museums, including the Museum of Modern Art.

=== Vitebsk Art School ===
In April 1919, the Visual Arts Department (IZO) of Nakompros sent Ermolaeva to Vitebsk to teach in the People's Art School. In November 1919, she invited Kazimir Malevich to come teach, as well. In 1921, after Mark Chagall departed, she became the school's director. Together with Malevich and his students, Ermolaeva developed the organization UNOVIS (Creators of the new art) – a society that positioned itself as a research laboratory focused on the development of art and artistic form. In 1920 and 1921, Ermolaeva's work was shown at UNOVIS exhibits in Moscow and in 1922 in Berlin. Ermolaeva authored one essay in an UNOVIS journal: “Ob izuchenii kubisma” [On the Study of Cubism] in Unovis Almanakh, 1 (1920). From 1920 – 1922, she was a member of and secretary for UNOVIS.

While in Vitebsk, she worked on a series of murals inspired by Suprematism.

=== State Institute of Artistic Culture ===
Following her return to Petrograd, Ermolaeva led the “color laboratory” in the State Institute of Artistic Culture (GINKHUK), which existed from 1923 – 1926. Malevich, Tatlin, Matiushin, Mansurov, and Punin were heads of departments there. Her relationship with Malevich weakened after GINKHUK ceased to operate in 1926.

=== Late 1920s – early 1930s ===
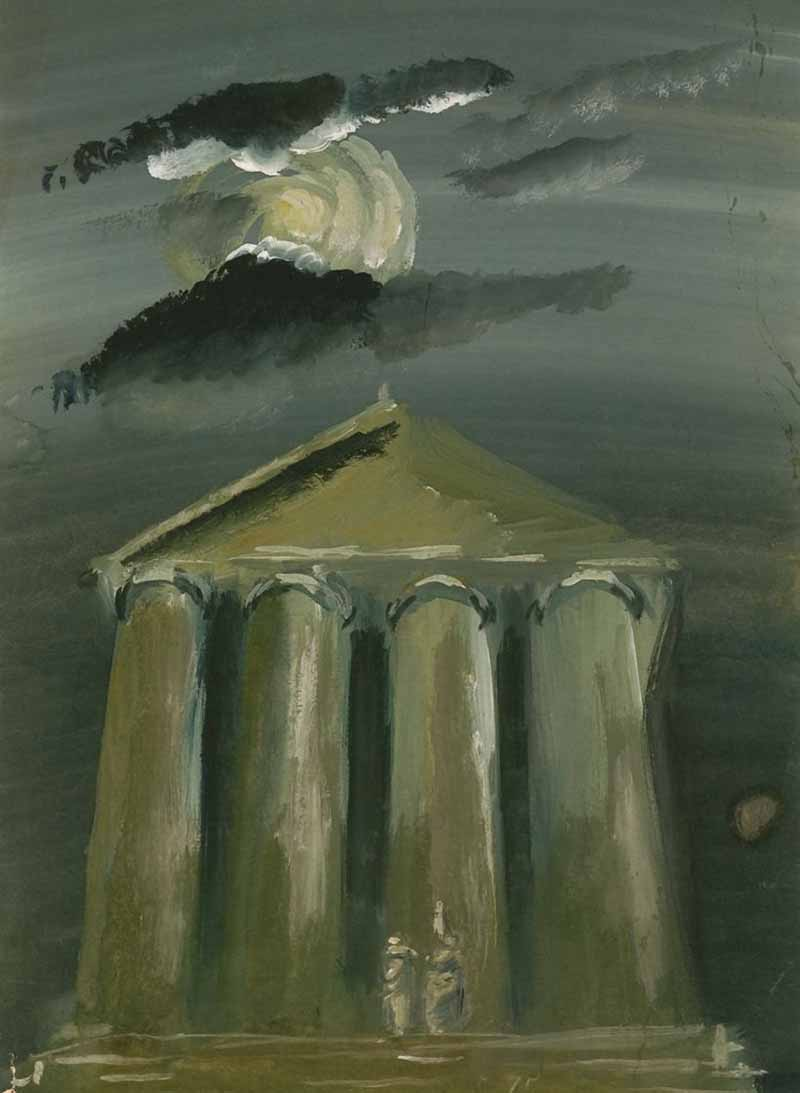
Illustraltion by Ermolayeva to De rerum natura by Lucretius, 1934

She became associated with the “Association of Real Art” (Oberiu), which included A. Vvedensky, N. Zabolotsky, Oleinikov, and Daniil Kharms.

In the summer of 1928, she traveled along the shores of the Barents Sea with the artist P. V. Velikanova. She brought back a series of gouaches (see "gouache"). These gouaches impressed both Kharms and Vvedensky and inspired them to create literary works based on Ermolaeva's works.

Ermolaeva's gouaches of 1928 include: “Seated woman,” “Three Figures,” “Accordionist,” and “Ballerina.” According to Ev. Kovtun, these show the influence of cubism, particularly Braque.

In the early 1930s, Ermolaeva shifted her focus from children's books to books for adults, particularly works with a philosophical, epic bent. She illustrated Goethe’s Reynard the Fox and Cervantes’s Don Quixote. Her last book illustrations consisted of a series of gouaches inspired by Lucretius’ On the Nature of Things.

She also worked as a teacher. Beginning in 1931, she gave lessons to the artist, M. B. Kazanskaia.

In 1929, together with the artists, Vladimir Sterligov, K. I. Rozhdestvenskii, L. A. Iudin, N. M. Suetin, and A. A. Leporskii, she became a member of a group dedicated to “painterly-sculptural realism.” In Ermolaeva's apartment, these artists held weekly gatherings, organized painting exhibitions, and hosted discussions. Their activities related to the exhibitions became the cause for a written denunciation.

In the beginning of the 1930s, Ermolaeva created a large painting cycle called The Village (Derevnia). The influence of suprematism is detectable here. Works in this cycle include figurative paintings, such as Baba so snopom and Baba s rebenkom.

In 1934, Ermolaeva created a series of still-life works depicting a pitcher, a glass, and apples.

Paintings in the State Russian Museum in St. Petersburg include: Three Figures (Golgotha) (1928) and Man with a Basket (1933).

=== Arrest, execution, and rehabilitation ===
On December 25, 1934, Ermolaeva was arrested at the same time as several other artists, including L. Gal'perin, Vladimir Sterligov, M. Kazanskaia, and Nina Kogan. On March 29, 1935, she was convicted by the NKVD according to articles 58-10 and 58-11. According to materials related to the case, V. M. Ermolaeva was found guilty of “anti-Soviet activity, expressed in propaganda promoting anti-Soviet ideas and for associating herself with anti-Soviet intelligentsia.” She was sentenced to three years of incarceration. On September 20, 1937, she was found guilty a second time by a NKVD troika according to articles 58-10 and 58-11 and sentenced to death. On September 26, 1937, she was shot in a labor camp near Karaganda, Kazakhstan.

On September 20, 1989, she was posthumously rehabilitated.

=== Exhibitions ===
"Revolution and Art" (1920, Vitebsk)

Exhibitions of UNOVIS (1920, 1921, Moscow)

"The First Russian Art Exhibition" (1922, Berlin)

"The Exhibition of Paintings by Petrograd Artists [representing] All Movements from 1918-1923" (1923. Petrograd)

Exhibition of GINKHUK (1924, Petrograd)

Exhibition of the Research Departments of GINKHUK (1926, Leningrad)

"Graphic and Book Art of the USSR" (1929, Amsterdam)

"Artists of the RSFSR of the last 15 years" (1932, 1933; Leningrad, Moscow)

"The Woman in Socialist Realist Construction" (1934, Leningrad)

"Leningrad in the Works of Contemporary Artists" (1934, Leningrad)

=== Posthumous exhibitions ===
Artworks of Vera Ermolaeva at the State Russian Museum in St. Petersburg, Russia (August 7, 2008 – September 30, 2008)

=== Vera Ermolaeva Foundation of Contemporary Feminist Art Initiatives ===
In Moscow, in 2013, the Vera Ermolaeva Foundation was established in her name; it is dedicated solely to the support of feminist initiatives in contemporary art.

== See also ==
- UNOVIS
