= Pavlo Nirinberg =

Ukrainian architect (1936–2008)

- Павло Рафаїлович Нірінберг
- Born: May 31, 1936; Vinnytsia, Ukrainian SSR, Soviet Union
- Died: August 5, 2008 (aged 72); New York City, United States
- Education: Leningrad Civil Engineering Institute
- Occupation: Architect
- Known for: Shaping the modern architectural landscape of Dnipro
- Awards: USSR State Prize; Merited Architect of Ukraine; Honorary Member of the Ukrainian Academy of Architecture

Pavlo Rafailovych Nirinberg (Ukrainian: Павло Рафаїлович Нірінберг; May 31, 1936 – August 5, 2008) was a Ukrainian architect known for his significant contributions to the architectural development of Dnipro.

== Biography ==
Pavlo Nirinberg was born on May 31, 1936, in Vinnytsia, Ukrainian SSR, into a Jewish family. He initially failed to gain admission to the Leningrad Civil Engineering Institute and instead studied at the Saratov Construction Technical School. He later enrolled in the Leningrad Civil Engineering Institute. During his fifth year, Nirinberg won a competition to design Leningrad's participation in the World Festival of Youth and Students in Helsinki. This achievement earned him a trip to Finland, where he visited the studio of renowned architect Alvar Aalto. His diploma project was supervised by Lazar Khidekel, a founder of UNOVIS, a proponent of suprematist ideas in architecture, and a student of Kazimir Malevich and Marc Chagall.

After graduating, Nirinberg was assigned to work in Krasnoyarsk, where he spent three years. There, he designed the Krasnoyarsk City Executive Committee building, the Krasnoyarsk City Party Committee building, and the Palace of Youth.

Upon completing his contract, Nirinberg responded to an advertisement in the journal Architecture of the USSR titled "Dnipropetrovsk Invites." He joined the Dniprotsivilproekt, the Dnipropetrovsk State Design Institute for Residential and Civil Construction.

In 1967, Nirinberg's son was born, and he was appointed Chief Architect of the Project. He also received an apartment. His work in the 1970s and 1980s significantly influenced the development of a distinctive Dnipro architectural school, shaping the city's modern appearance through major public buildings.

=== Notable projects in Dnipro ===
- Residential district "Lotsmanskyi" (later renamed "Peremoha")
- "House of Books" (1976)
- City Lecture Hall (Summer Theater) (1977)
- Dnipro Circus (1977–1980)
- Dnipro City Council building (1983)
- "Batkyvshchyna" Cinema
- Reconstruction of Mechnykova Street

In 1998, Nirinberg emigrated to the United States and settled in New York City. There, he participated in architectural competitions, including designing a sketch for theater ticket booths for New York City. Disturbed by developments in Dnipro, he wrote an open letter to the city mayor, Ivan Kulichenko, criticizing the distorted design of the "Brama" skyscraper near the Central Bridge and the circus.

=== Affiliations and honors ===
- Member of the Union of Architects of the USSR.
- Laureate of the USSR State Prize.
- Merited Architect of Ukraine.
- Honorary Member of the Ukrainian Academy of Architecture.
- Member of the committee for the State Prize of Ukraine in Architecture.

Nirinberg's elder daughter lives in Berlin and teaches architecture using a textbook co-authored by her father and leading professors from the Dnipropetrovsk Civil Engineering Institute.

Pavlo Nirinberg died on August 5, 2008, in the United States.

== Gallery ==
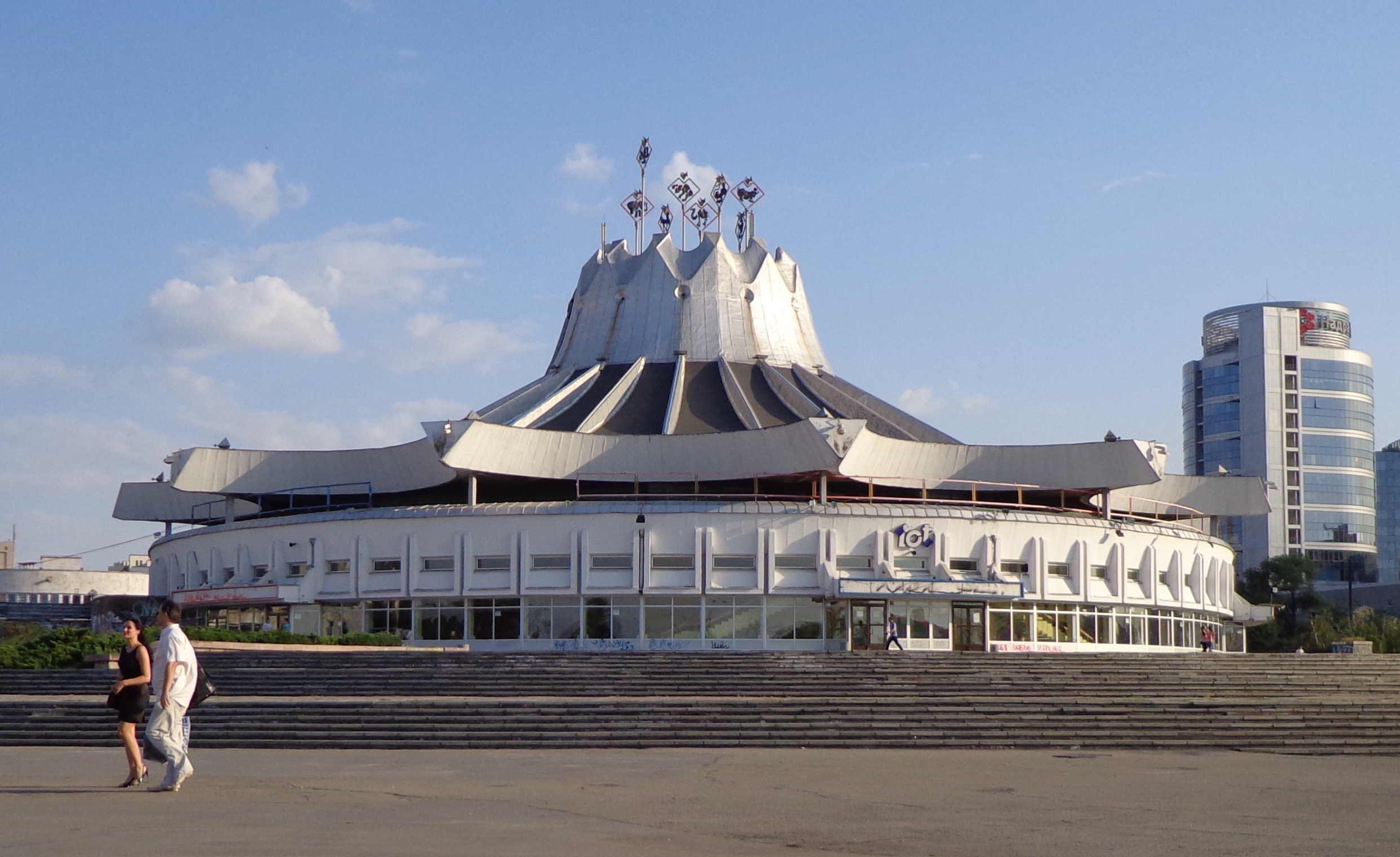

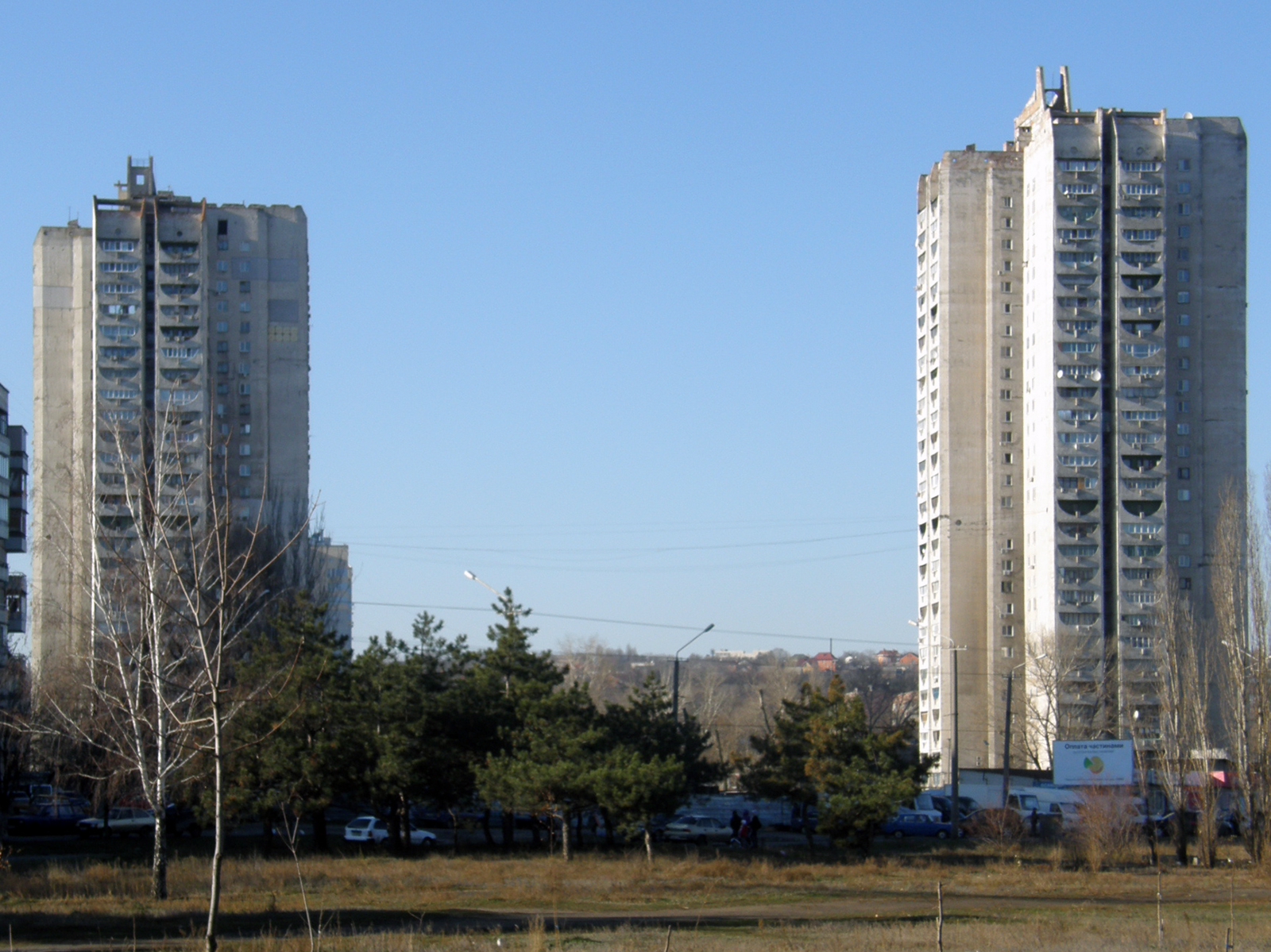

== Legacy ==
In 2016, a street in the Nahirnyi area of the Sobornyi District in Dnipro was named in his honor.
