= Toploye =

Toploye Топлое Svyatodukhovskoye, Soymonovo, Yekaterinino
- village
- Location of Toploye
- Location of Toploye Toploye (Penza Oblast)
- Coordinates: 52°21′45.0″N 45°1′39.7″E
- Country: Russia
- Federal subject: Penza Oblast
- Administrative district: Maloserdobinsky
- Founded: 1800

Population (2010 Census)
  - Total: 513
- Time zone: UTC+3 (MSK)
- Postal code(s): 442807
- OKTMO ID: 56644410116

Toploye or Toploe (Russian: То́плое) is a rural locality (a selo) in Maloserdobinsky district, Penza Oblast, Russia. There is an object of cultural heritage of the Penza Oblast — the St. Michael's church. The population was 513 (2010 census).

== Geography ==
It is located 10 km south of Malaya Serdoba and 90 km south of Penza, near the border with the Saratov Oblast, in a steppe area.

== History ==
The village was founded by General Pyotr Soimonov on land granted to him by decree of Empress Catherine II in 178. In 1800 it was inherited by his daughter Yekaterina Gagarina.

The first settlers were transported by Soimonov from the Nizhny Novgorod and Simbirsk governorates. In 1811, the village was called Soymonovo, Yekaterinino. The first street was built at the lake Tyoploye (lit. 'warm'), so from the 1820s the village began to be called by its current name. In 1834, a stone church was built and consecrated in the name of the Descent of the Holy Spirit with a chapel in the name of the Archangel Michael (now it is an architectural monument).

In the autumn of 1905, the village was burned down by a militant group of Malaya Serdoba peasants who had long-standing accounts with the Gagarins, who, according to their belief, seized their land, granted to the ancestors of the peasants in 1699 by Peter the Great. The rich Gagarin's archive was destroyed by fire.

== Description ==
In the village on January 1, 2022 - 210 households, a 300-seat house of culture, a 150-seat primary school, a paramedic-obstetric station, a school stadium, a shop, historical and cultural monuments: a monument to fellow countrymen who died during the Great Patriotic War, a monument to the victims of the famine of 1933, the Mikhailo-Arkhangelsk Church, 4 ponds. 7 streets: Zazhigina (central), Kuzyatovka, Chuvarleyevka, Kozina, Orlovka, Mira, Molodezhnaya. On April 18, 2020, cellular communication presented by Tele2 appeared for the first time in the village.

== Incidents ==
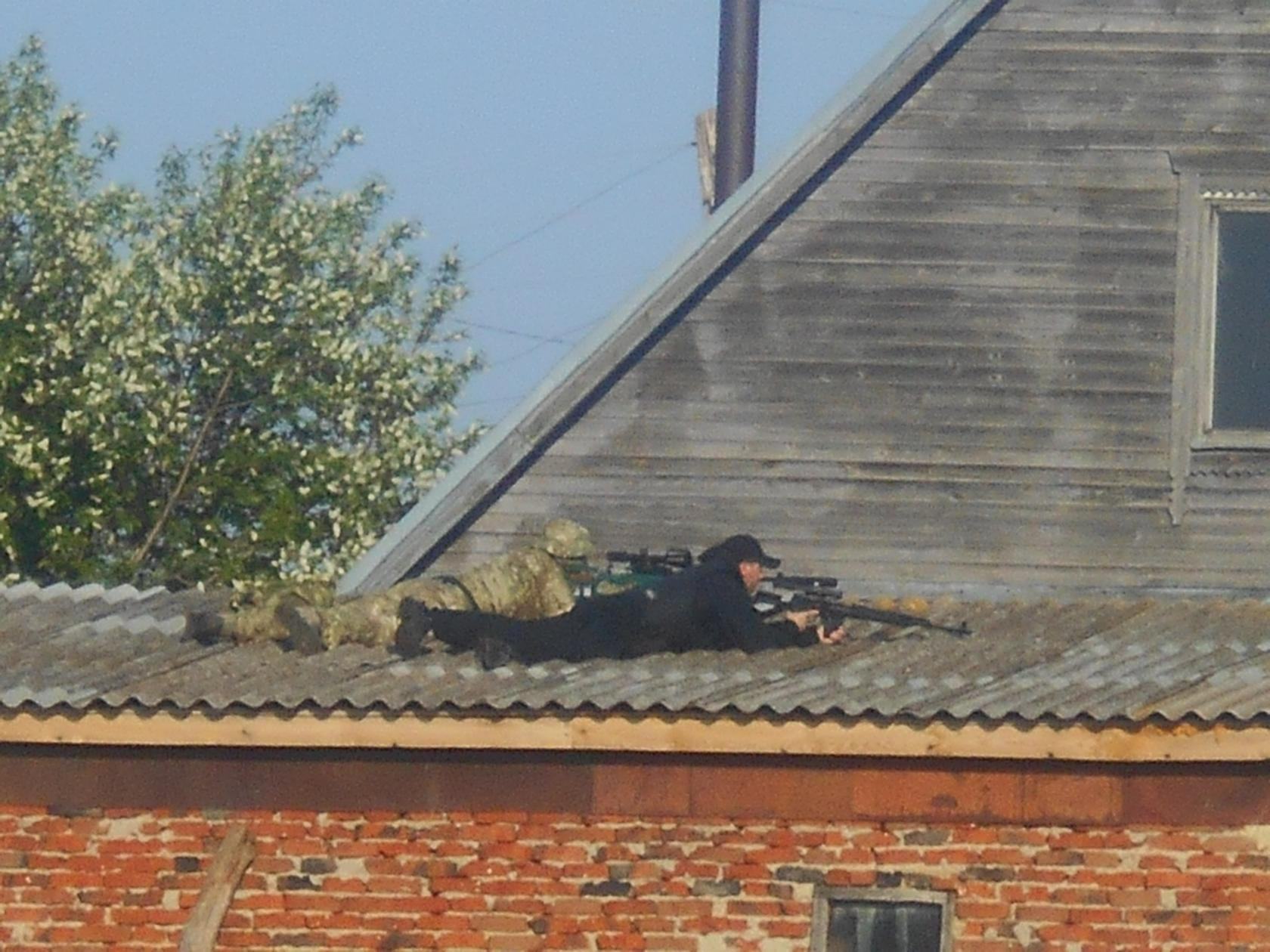
Employees of the SOBR on the roof of the shed in Toploye

As a result of the shooting that occurred on May 8, 2019, 2 people were killed, two more were injured.

== Notable people ==
Ivan Zazhigin (1925-2001) is a Lieutenant Colonel of the Soviet Army, participant of the World War II, Hero of the Soviet Union.
