= Moscow Cinema (Saint Petersburg) =

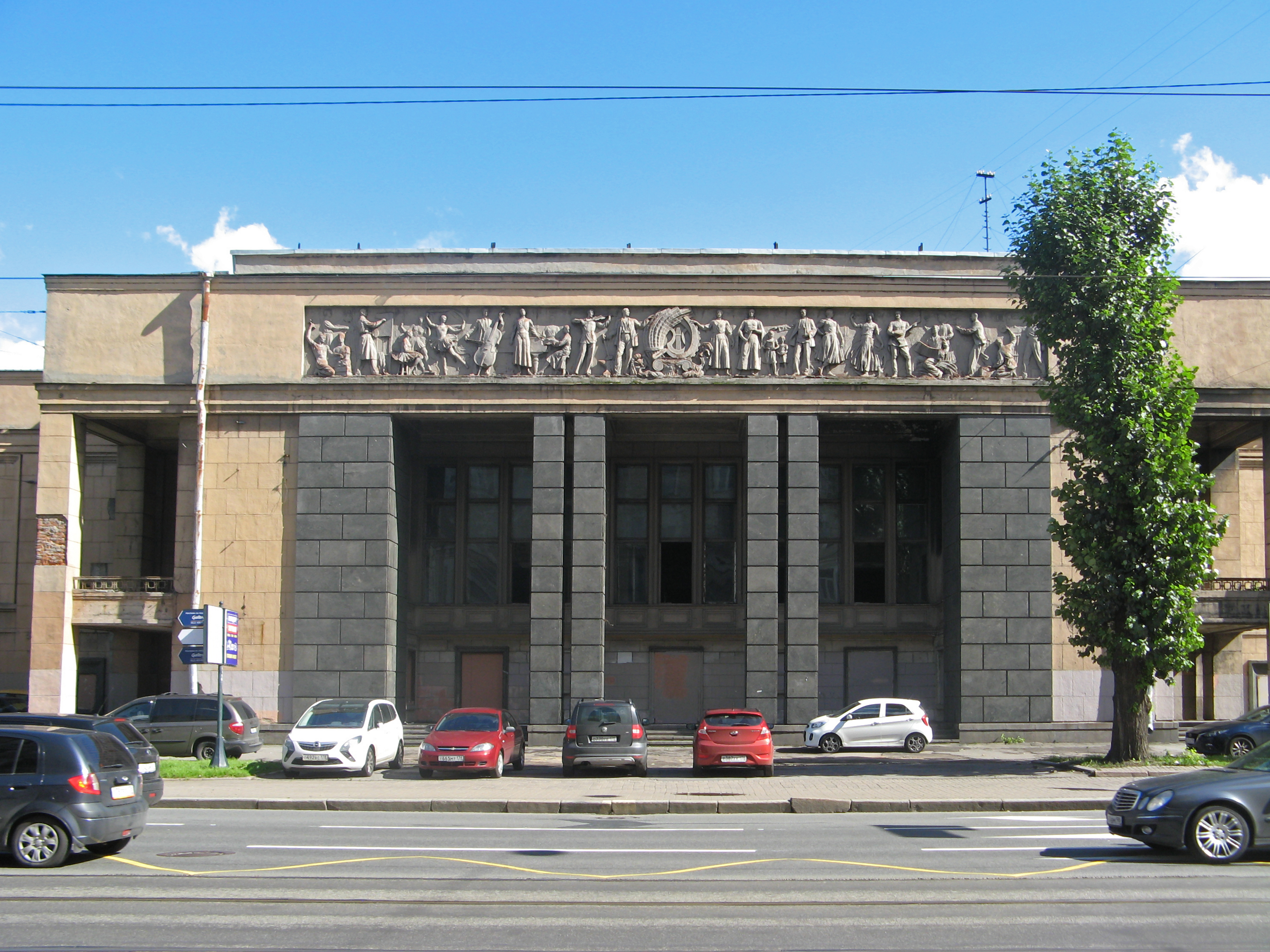
- The central part of the facade

General information
- Address: 6 Staro-Petergofsky Avenue
- Town or city: Saint Petersburg
- Country: Russia
- Coordinates: 59.9126°N 30.2779°E

The "Moscow" cinema is a historical building in Saint Petersburg, Russia.

== History ==
The building was the first three-hall cinema in the USSR. A competition for the design of the cinema building for the Kirovsky District was announced in 1933, and the first place was awarded to the project by Lazar Khidekel. However, after winning the competition, the architect proposed a completely different design, which was approved in 1936 and constructed between 1937 and 1939.

It was built on the site of the demolished Church of St. Catherine in Ekateringof. In 2008, the building was sold at auction with the condition that the new owner would restore the interiors and façade. In 2012, the Admiralteysky District administration requested that the building be transferred for social needs, as the renovation had not yet begun, but the request was denied. In 2015, a new reconstruction project was announced. According to the plan, the central hall would be used as a theater, while the side halls would serve as exhibition spaces. It was also noted that the design process was challenging due to the building's structural peculiarities ("The building is constructed in such a way that its walls carry no load other than their own... The entire structure of the hall rests not on the walls or foundations, but directly on the ground").

== Description ==
The walls of the lobby are lined with greenish artificial marble, and a staircase from it leads to the foyer. On the second floor, three halls are arranged around the foyer, each seating 400 people. The three-hall layout allowed for more frequent showings — while viewers are gathering for a screening in one hall, a film is starting in the second, and finishing in the third.

The main façade is adorned with a portico featuring pylons clad in dark gray granite from the Zhezhelevsky quarries. The portico is topped by an attic with a bas-relief made of cement mixed with cast iron filings (created by I. V. Krestovsky). According to the author himself, all the figures on the frieze represent real people, although the likeness is not always exact. The female sculptor is Janson-Manizer, the painter is Samokhvalov, and the ballerinas — the three Auroras from The Sleeping Beauty — are Ulanova, Vecheslova, and Dudinskaya. The figure "at the piano" is Preobrazhenskaya, and the one with a camera is Strekalov-Obolensky (the only one depicted with precise facial features).

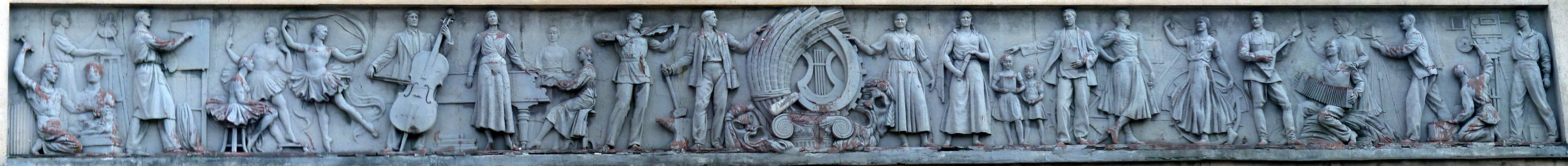
Frieze decoration

== Literature ==
- Памятники архитектуры Ленинграда (in Russian). Leningrad: Стройиздат. 1976. p. 616.
