= Suetin =

Suetin is a surname. Notable people with the surname include:

- Alexey Suetin (1926–2001), Russian chess player
- Nikolai Suetin (1897–1954), Russian artist
