= Anna Kogan =

Russian artist

Anna Aleksandrovna Kogan
- Born: 1902; Vitebsk, Russian Empire (1902–1974)
- Died: 1974 (aged 71-72); Leningrad, Soviet Union
- Education: Higher Art School of Vitebsk
- Movement: Modernism

Anna Aleksandrovna Kogan (1902–1974) was a Soviet artist. She was a modernist who worked in several media, including painting, textiles, ceramics, glass and sculpture.

== Biography ==
Kogan was born in Vitebsk, Russian Empire in 1902.

From 1919 to 1922 Kogan studied at the Higher Art School of Vitebsk under Kazimir Malevich, where she was one of his favourite students. She was part of the group UNOVIS, which focused on suprematist art and produced projects and publications which influenced the avant-garde in Russia. In 1924 she joined the architectural department of the Institute of Artistic Culture, Leningrad.

Kogan died in Leningrad in 1974.

In 2009, Artnews reported that she was an "enigma to art historians", due to a lack of biographical history and the fact that none of her works appeared in Russian Art Museums.

Her work is included in the collections of the Fine Arts Museums of San Francisco and the Seattle Art Museum.
