= Ilya Chashnik =

Soviet artist

Ilya Grigorevich Chashnik
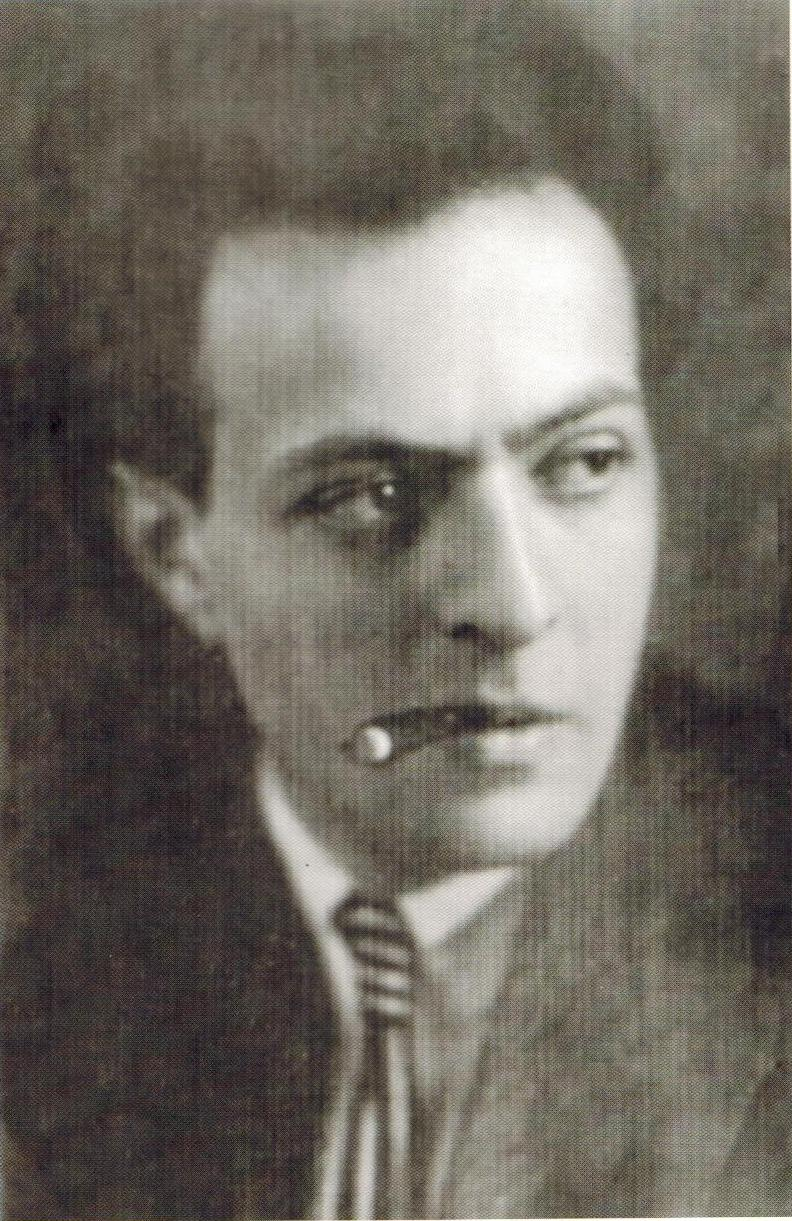
- Born: June 26, 1902; Lucyn, Russian Empire
- Died: March 4, 1929 (aged 26); Leningrad
- Education: UNOVIS school
- Movement: suprematism

Ilya Grigorevich Chashnik (26 June 1902 – 4 March 1929) was a suprematist artist, a pupil of Kazimir Malevich and a founding member of the UNOVIS school.

== Biography ==
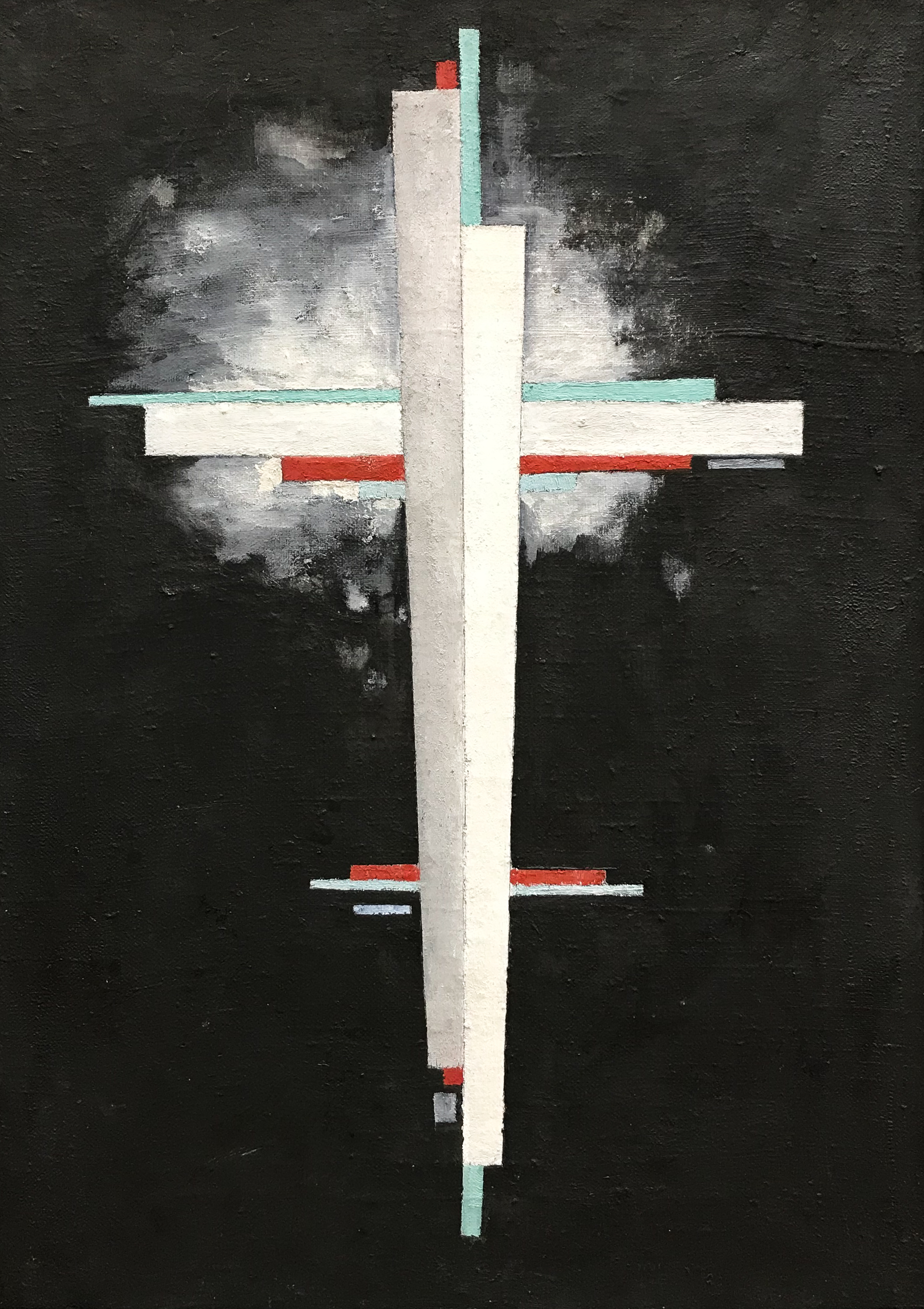
"Suprematism", 1923

Chashnik was born to a Jewish family in 1902, Lucyn, Russian Empire, currently Ludza, Latvia. He started studying in Yehuda Pen's art school at Vitebsk when he was just eleven years old. He became a student of Marc Chagall. By 1918, he moved to Moscow to work in an art workshop directed by Kazimir Malevich. He returned after Malevich accepted a senior teaching position at Vitebsk School of Drawing and Painting.

Chashnik was notably able in a variety of media. Aleksandra Semenovna Shatskikh describes him as "famous for his inexhaustible inventiveness and ability to apply Suprematist principles to virtually all forms of art, including easel painting." He painted, was proficient in metalwork, and designed ceramics produced at the Imperial Porcelain Factory (then known as the Lomonosov Porcelain Factory). Chasnik, along with Nikolai Suetin, was recruited by the factory during his time as a UNOVIS member.

He died in 1929 in Leningrad, at the age of 27.

The University of Texas at Austin held an exhibition dedicated to his works in 1981.

== Works ==
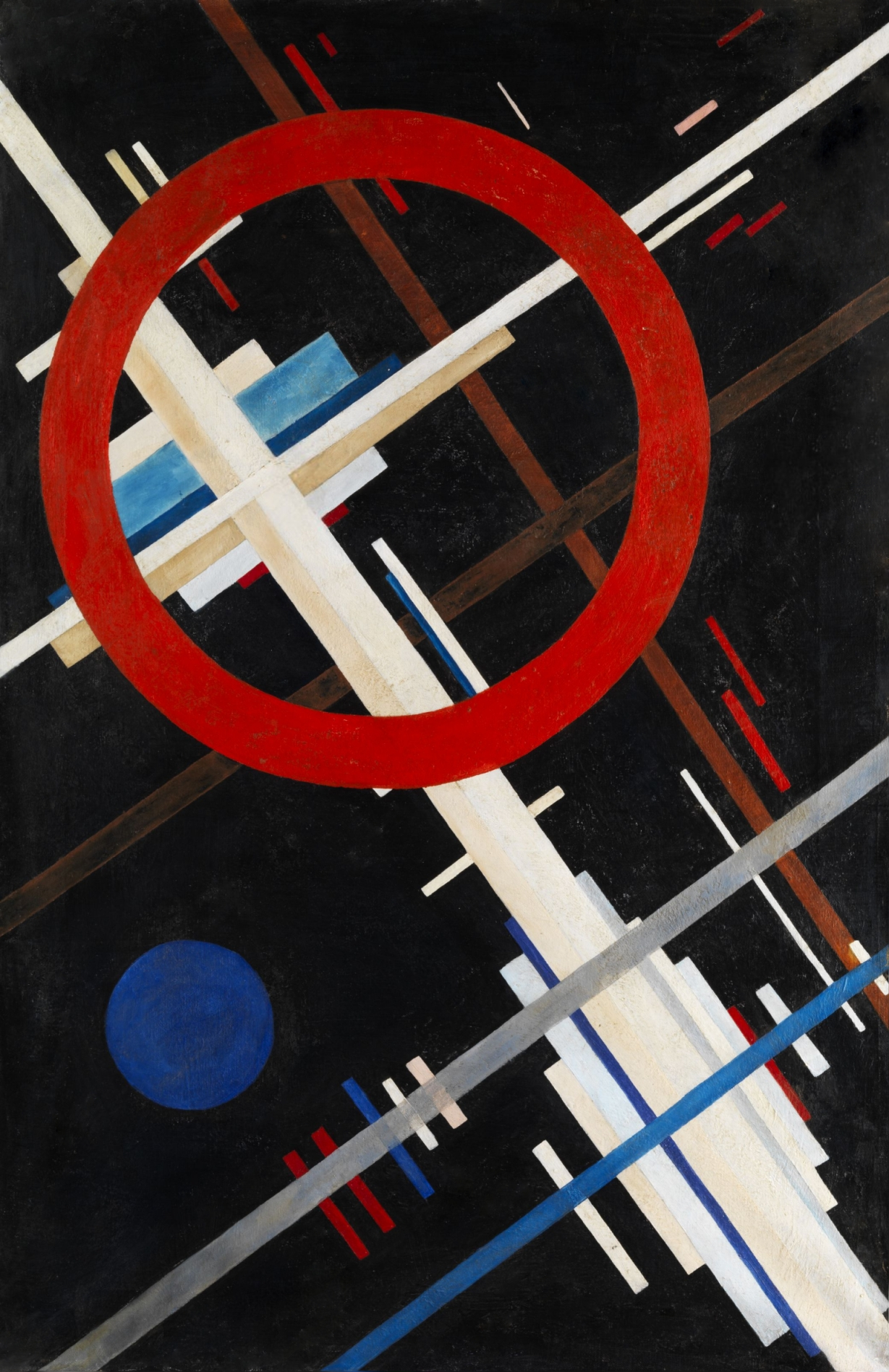
Suprematist composition

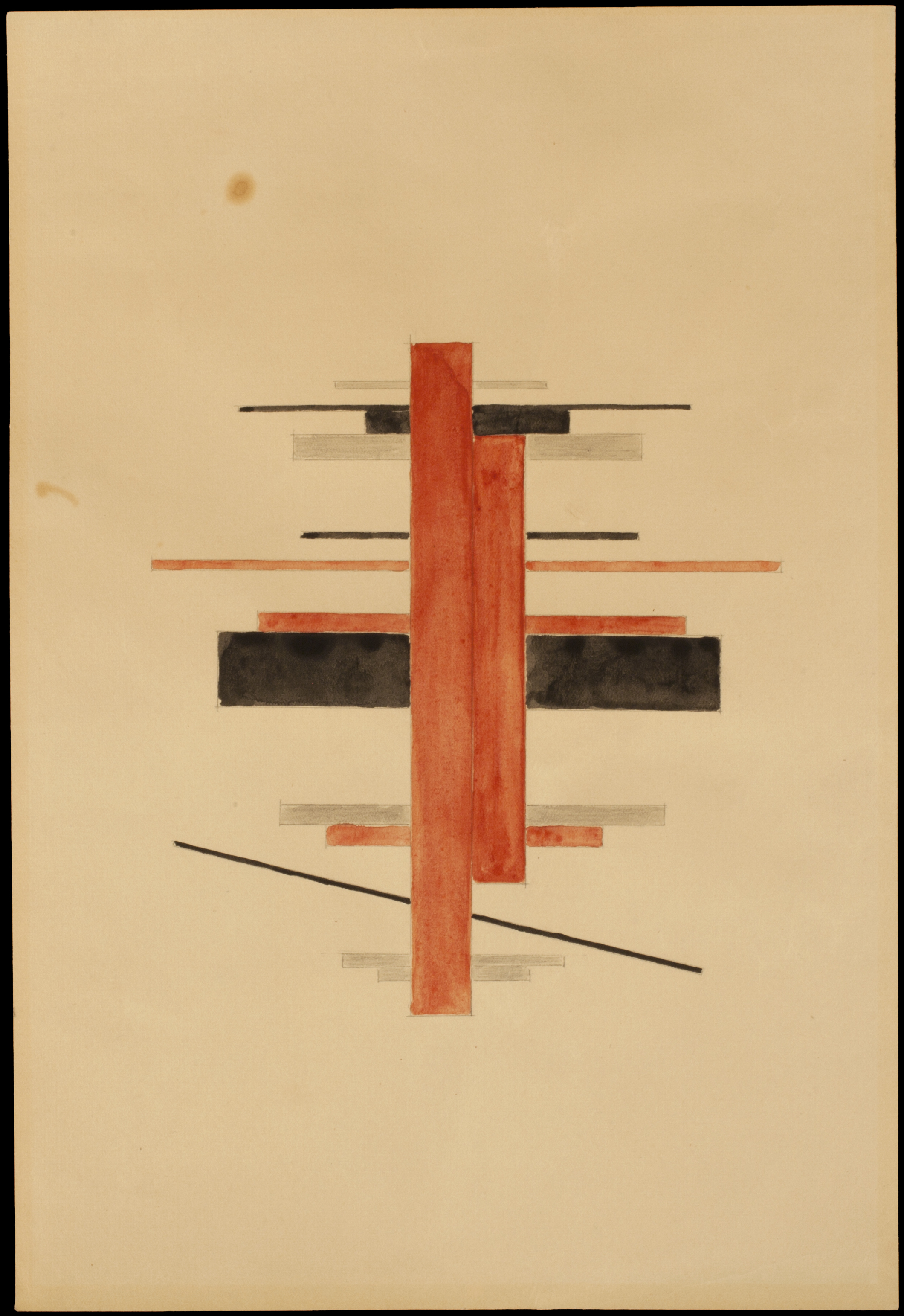
Suprematist Composition, 1920, M.T. Abraham Foundation

== Literature ==
- Чашник Илья Григорьевич (1902-1929), ленинградский художник, ученик К. Малевича. Первая монография о мастере. (publ. 2002), ISBN 5-85164-077-4
