= Nina Kogan =

Russian painter

Nina Kogan

Nina Kogan (c. 1887–1942) was a Russian painter known for her Suprematist works.

== Life and career ==
Nina Osipovna (Iosifovna) Kogan was born in 1887 or 1889 in Vitebsk, Saint Petersburg, or Moscow, and studied at the St. Ekaterina School in St. Petersburg in 1911–1913. In 1919 she helped to organize City Museum in Petrograd. She went on to study at the People's Art School in Vitebsk, Belarus, and soon became a teacher there, together with Marc Chagall, El Lissitzky, and Kazimir Malevich.

Kogan became a member of Malevich's UNOVIS art collective. While a member of the group, she created the work Suprematist Ballet in an attempt to animate Suprematist forms and ideas in dance. She also took part designing new version of futuristic opera Victory over the Sun. Kogan participated in on several exhibitions of early 1920s, such as "Erste Russische Kunstausstellung" in Berlin, 1922; "Exhibition of Works by Women Artists" in Leningrad, 1936; the "Sixth Exhibition of Works by Leningrad Artists", Leningrad, 1940; and the "Seventh Exhibition of Works by Leningrad Artists", Leningrad, 1941.

In 1922 Kogan married artist Anatoly Borisov. In 1922-23 she was a consultant in one of the Moscow's museums. Since 1928 she worked as children's books illustrator; she did not work in Suprematism after Vitebsk.

Kogan died in 1942 in Leningrad, during the Siege of Leningrad.

== Legacy ==
In the 1980s a large number of works attributed to her appeared on the European art market.

Her works are in collections of the Seattle Art Museum and the Moderna Museet, Stockholm.

Australian poet Clive James wrote a poem about Kogan, titled "Nina Kogan's Geometrical Heaven":

Two of her little pictures grace my walls:
Suprematism in a special sense,
With all the usual bits and pieces flying
Through space, but carrying a pastel-tinged
Delicacy to lighten the strict forms
Of that hard school and blow them all sky-high,
Splinters and stoppers from the bombing of
An angel’s boudoir.

== Gallery ==
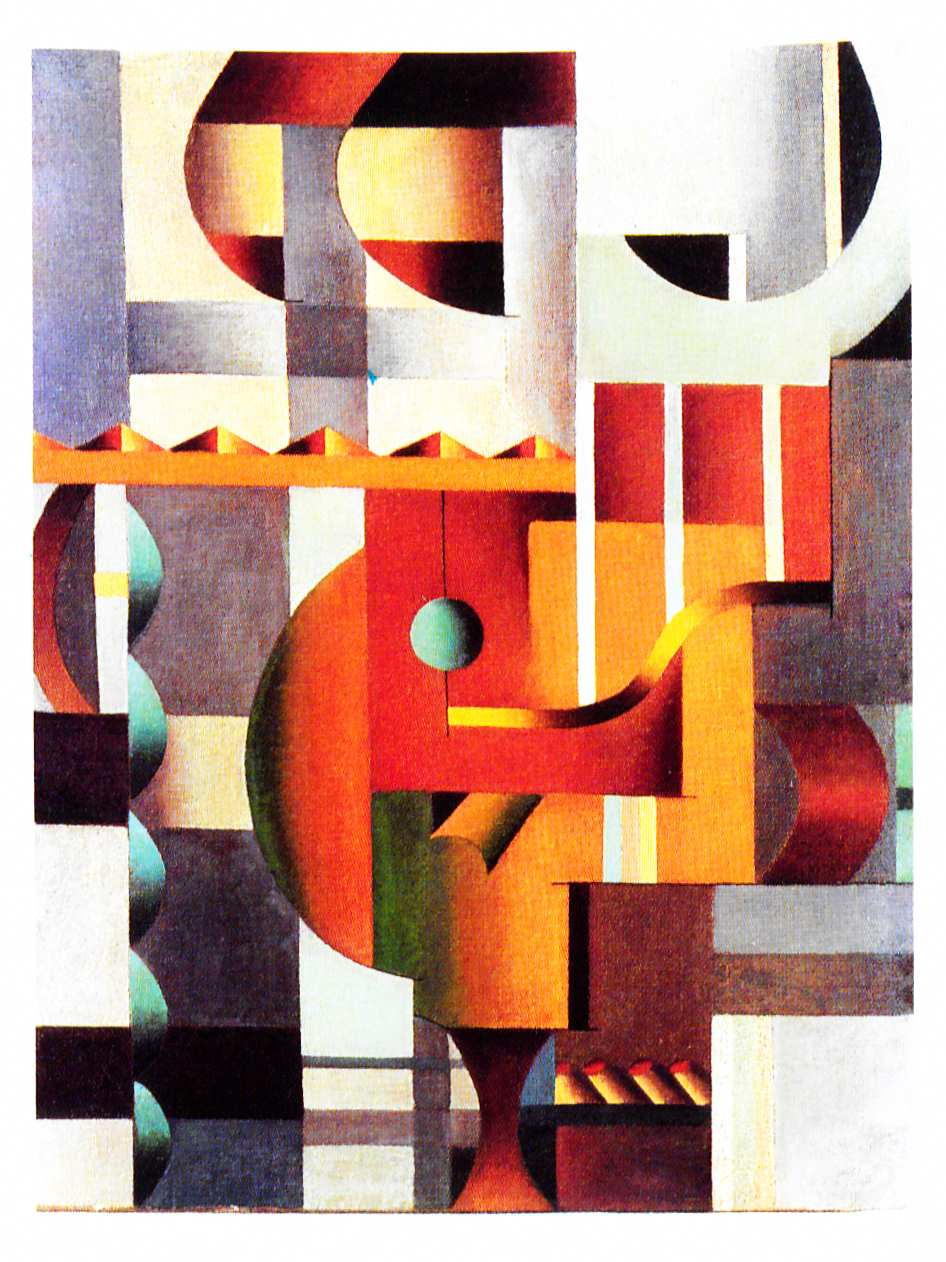
Composition 1920

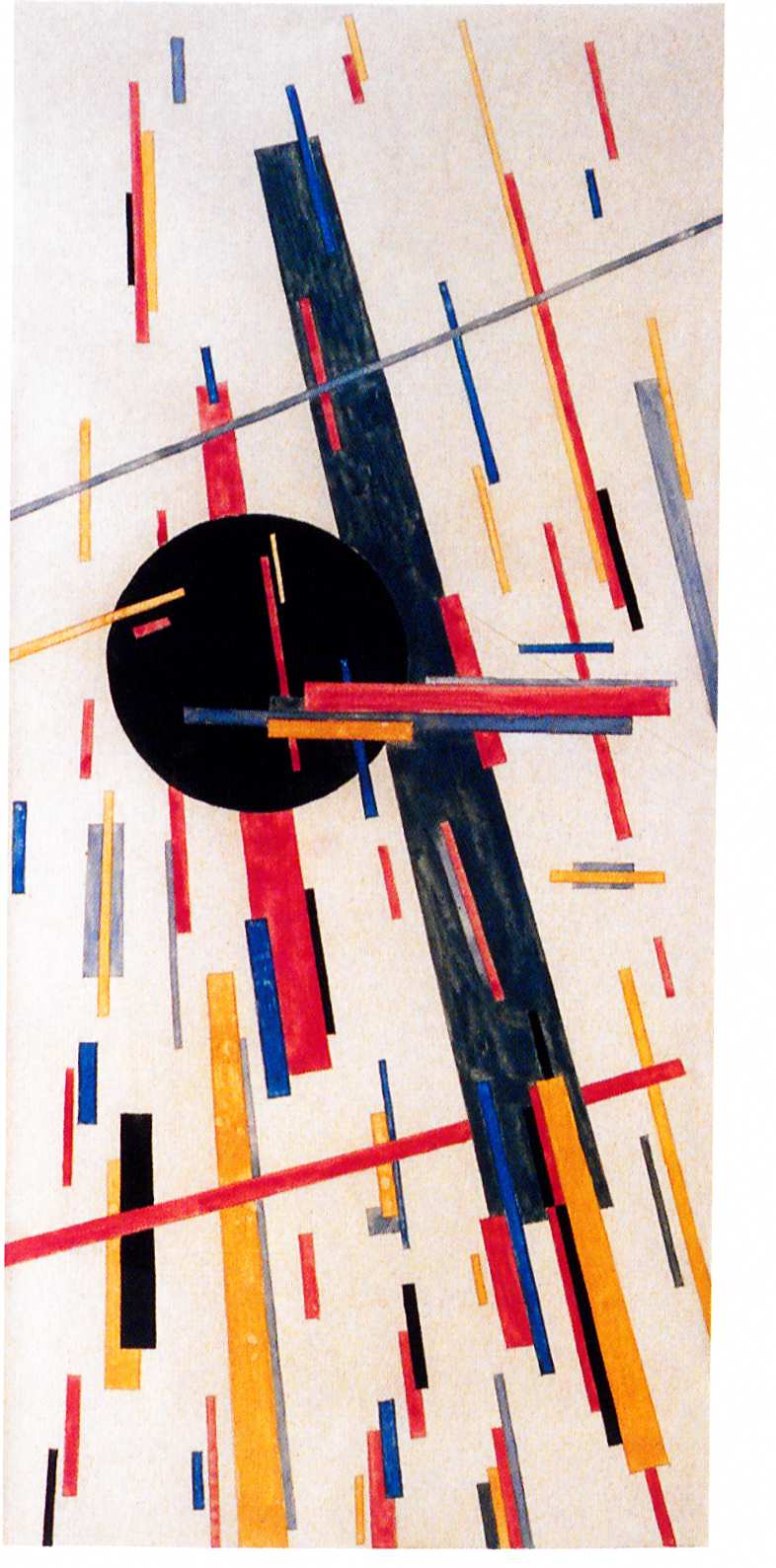
Suprematist Composition, 1921

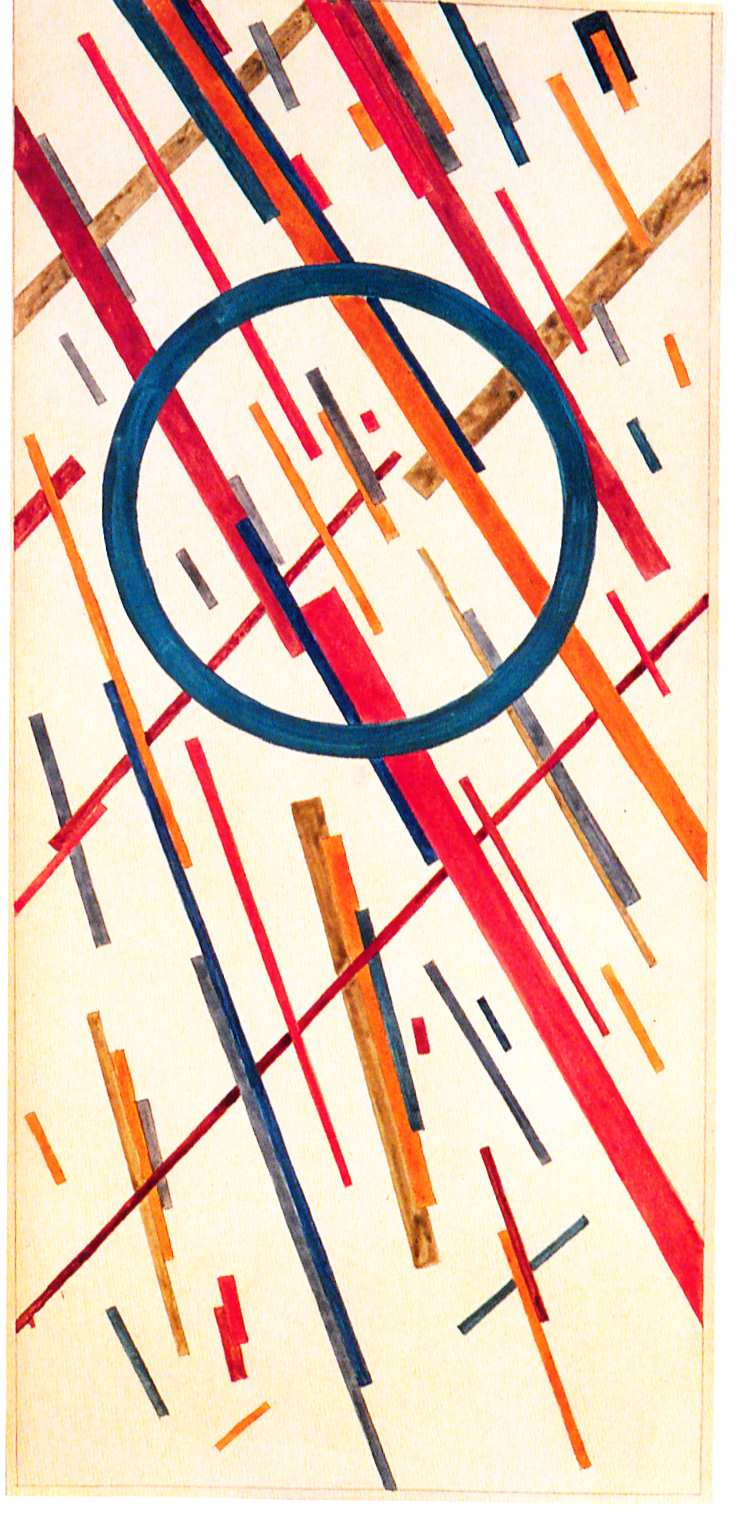
Suprematist Composition, 1921

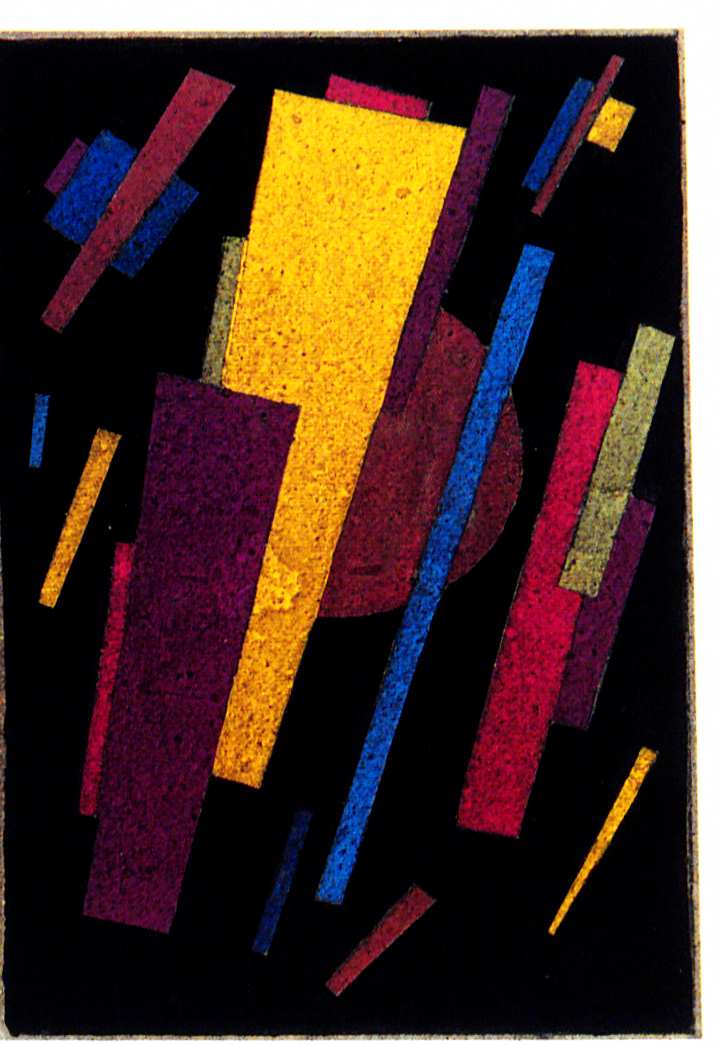
Suprematist Composition, 1921-1923

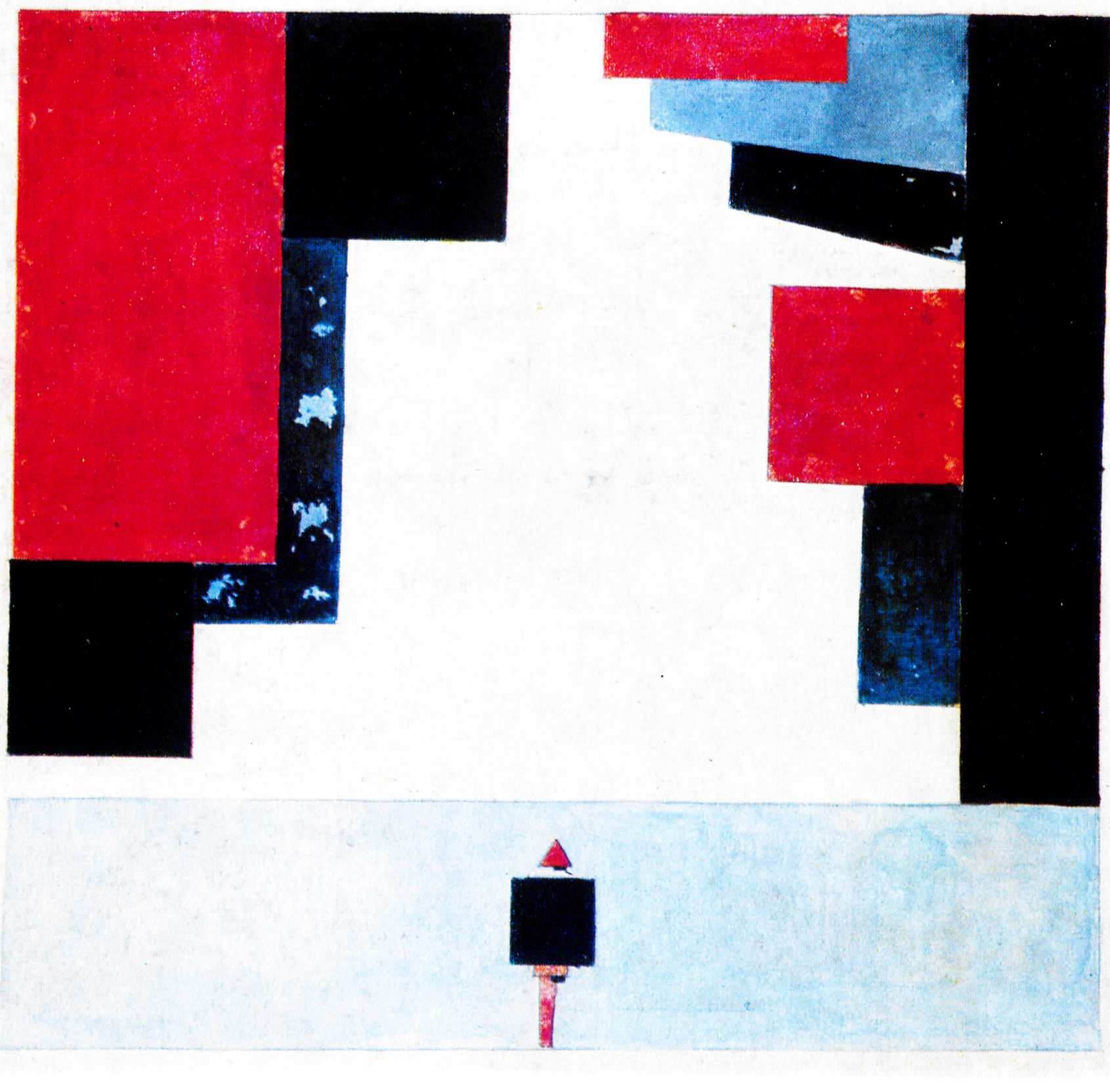
Suprematist ballet, Unovis almanach, 1920
