= Mark Khidekel =

Russian architect

Mark Khidekel (Russian: Марк Хидекель; born in 1946 in Leningrad) is an architect and designer.

== Biography ==
Khidekel earned a M.A. and Ph.D. from the Leningrad Institute of Architecture and Construction. He began his study of architecture under his father, Lazar Khidekel, one of the major Russian avant-garde artists and architects, disciple of Mark Chagall and Kazimir Malevich.

== Career ==
- Having won the first competition in 1967, Khidekel designed a number of monuments devoted to the victims and soldiers of WWII, located in St. Petersburg, Severomorsk, and Tallinn, which earned Khidekel the State Prize for Young Creators in 1972.
- 1970-1986: Served as the Director of the Scientific Experimental Architectural Studio. Under his leadership, it grew to become the State Institute of Architecture [1986 - 1993, St. Petersburg, Russia].
- Major Projects of the 1970s and 1980s:
  - The Extension of the State Russian Museum and Arts Square at the historical center of St. Petersburg
  - The Depository for Modern Art collections in St. Petersburg
  - A concept of the conversion of the Kronshtadt complex of fortresses
  - Educational & Ecological Campground in Karelia
  - Cosmic Habitat, the Architectural-scientific project - a part of the Soviet-American cosmic program Apollo-Soyuz.
- 1987–1993: Khidekel was involved in a number of international collaborative projects with architectural firms and associates such as Dyer/Brown & Associates, ETH-Zurich, and Wayss & Freytag, Frankfurt. He participated in an international competition on Euro-Lille and did extensive lecturing at ETH - Zurich; architectural schools in Lille, and Versailles; and at the University of Cambridge in the UK.
- Khidekel participated in several international competitions and has received a number of international awards including the Grand Prix at the World InterArch Biennial 1983.
- Since 1993 Khidekel has served as a visiting professor at the Parsons School of Design and continues to work as a licensed architect and designer in the United States, practicing in New York City.
- In 1995 Khidekel collaborated with Philip Johnson on a large Russian-American urban project, The New Business Center in St. Petersburg. (archives2.getty.edu:8082/xtf/view?docId=ead/980060/980060.xml;query=;...980060 980060 Philip Johnson papers 1908-2002 (bulk 1925-1998) 1908-2002 .... Archives, Personal Papers, and Manuscripts The Getty Research Institute ...between Johnson and architect Mark Khidekel).
- Khidekel has also participated in a number of competitions at Duke University's Nasher Museum of Art (1996); Museum of Biblical Art in New York City (1996); and Babi Yar Memorial in Denver, Co (2006-7). He conceived a number of futuristic projects such as Vertical Highway (1998-), a new type of urban multi-use structure which combines the American Dream of suburban-like private housing with the rapidly growing demand for living space in an urban environment like New York City and Bridge-City (2006-) (in collaboration with Roman Khidekel). Bridge-City is dedicated to solving New York's problem of congestion, traffic, lack of emergency transportation egress, parking spaces, and high cost of land by building multipurpose bridge structures at the waterfront. This project would create a new urban center for living, working, commerce, and leisure while serving as a shelter in the time of natural disaster.
- In 2016, Mark and Roman Khidekel's issued a proposal for the development of an environmentally friendly public space along the East River Esplanade (2016).
- Khidekel is a founding member of the Lazar Khidekel Society and is a trustee of the Russian American Cultural Center.

Selected exhibitions:

- Suprematism Infinity: Reflections, Interpretations, Explorations
- Harriman Institute of Columbia University - Harriman Atrium 420 West 118th Street, 12th Floor. (December 1, 2015 – January 22, 2016)
- Cosmic Communist Constructions Photographed - exhibition at ZKM Museum of Contemporary art, Karlsruhe, Germany (2010-2011)
- Tests of Time. Five Reflections - JCC in Manhattan (2003)
- Skyline Remembered, Skyline Thought - NYC (2002)
- Dumbo Double Deuce, NY (2001)
- National Art Club, NYC (1996)
- Small Format - The Leonard Hutton Galleries, NYC (1995)
- The Educational Alliance, NYC (1995)

Museum collections:

- Rutgers University's Zimmerli Art Museum
- The State Russian Museum in St. Petersburg
- The State Museum of the History of St. Peterburg
