= Lazar Khidekel =

Belarusian artist and architect (1904–1986)

Lazar Markovich Khidekel
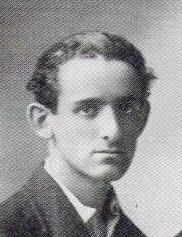
- Lazar Chidekel (1922)
- Born: Lazar; 1904; Vitebsk, Russian Empire
- Died: 1986 (aged 81–82); Leningrad, USSR
- Education: Vitebsk School of Art (1919-1922), Petrograd Institute of Civil Engineers (1922-1929)
- Occupation: Architect
- Children: Mark Khidekel
- Practice: Artist, architect

Lazar Markovich Khidekel (Vitebsk 1904 – Leningrad 1986) was an artist, designer, architect and theoretician, who is noted for realizing the abstract, avant-garde Suprematist movement through architecture.

== Early life ==
In 1918 at the age of 14, Khidekel was selected by Marc Chagall to study at the Vitebsk school of art, where he first met Kazimir Malevich and El Lissitzky. Khidekel became one of the founders of the group UNOVIS – Affirmers of New Art, led by Malevich and one of a few of Malevich's students, along with Ilya Chashnik and Nikolai Suetin, who deeply embraced Suprematist style and philosophy, and constituted the nucleus of genuine followers who soon become into their master's partners and assistants.

== Contributions ==
By developing Suprematist ideas, Khidekel early defined his personal approach to Suprematist canon, introducing his own Suprematist painterly idioms, forms, ideas, and thoughts.

Rapid maturation of Lazar Khidekel’s creative approach during the vital years of 1919–1922 at Vitebsk Art School, defined his role in developing Suprematism’s inherent potential in painting and architecture. Elaborating conceptual approach and crossing disciplinary divide, Khidekel's contribution was critical in extricating from two-dimensional Suprematist shape to its three-dimensional, spatial expression, and as noted Maria Kokkori, Khidekel was distinguished by drawing buildings and building drawings.

In December 1920, after El Lissitzky left for Moscow, Khidekel and his classmate Ilya Chashnik headed the Architecture and Technical Department of the Vitebsk Art School. Inspired by his artistic imagination, Khidekel developed a lifelong fascination with visionary and imaginary architecture that he knew could only become a reality in the distant future.

=== Suprematism ===
He played an important role in the development of Suprematism, applying its precepts to both practical architectural designs and imaginary floating structures of the future. He was instrumental in the transition from planar Suprematism to volumetric Suprematism, creating axonometric projections (The Aero-club: Horizontal architecton, 1922–23), making three-dimensional models, such as the architectons, designing objects (model of an "Ashtray", 1922–23), and producing the first Suprematist architectural project (The Workers’ Club, 1926). In the mid-1920s, he began his journey into the realm of visionary architecture. Directly inspired by Suprematism and its notion of an organic form-creation continuum, he explored new philosophical, scientific and technological futuristic approaches, and proposed innovative solutions for the creation of new urban environments, where people would live in harmony with nature and would be protected from man-made and natural disasters (his still topical proposal for flood protection – the City on the Water, 1925, etc.).

In 1926, while a student of the Architectural College (PIGI) in Petrograd, he created the first real Suprematist architectural project. His immense influence on the students and professors of PIGI resulted in a series of collaborative works with his professors A.S. Nikolsky and G. Simonov that defined Lazar Khidekel’s groundbreaking role in developing Suprematist and Constructivist-Suprematist style as an ultimate trend of the Leningrad avant-garde architecture of mid 1920s – early 1930s.

In the mid 1920s he envisioned his projects of the futurist cities such as Aero-city, Garden-city, City on the Poles and on the Water, that firstly young Lazar Khidekel defined in his 1920 hand lithographed manifesto “AERO. Articles and Projects”. In this publication Lazar defined new social and aesthetic approaches and solutions to the issues of the ecological impact on the environment produced by the modern industrial civilization.

He was the only architect from Malevich's group who completed innovative ideas in the building of residential complexes, theaters, movie-houses, and in drafting plans for new forms of skyscrapers. In the middle of the 1920s Khidekel was exploring specialized projects of buildings for a new way of life, the communal housing in Suprematist style, as well as he was the first in the 20th century to create projects of futuristic cities.
