= Maloserdobinsky District =

Maloserdobinsky District Малосердобинский район
- District
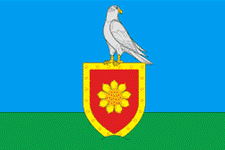
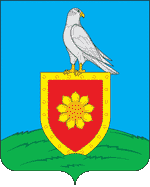
- Flag Coat of arms
- Location of Maloserdobinsky District in Penza Oblast
- Coordinates: 52°27′58″N 44°57′17″E
- Country: Russia
- Federal subject: Penza Oblast
- Administrative center: Malaya Serdoba

Area
  - Total: 1,100 km^{2} (420 sq mi)

Population (2010 Census)
  - Total: 9,824
  - Density: 8.9/km^{2} (23/sq mi)
  - Urban: 0%
  - Rural: 100%

Administrative structure
  - Administrative divisions: 6 selsoviet
  - Inhabited localities: 22 rural localities

Municipal structure
  - Municipally incorporated as: Maloserdobinsky Municipal District
  - Municipal divisions: 0 urban settlements, 6 rural settlements
- Time zone: UTC+3 (MSK)
- OKTMO ID: 56644000
- Website: http://rmserd.pnzreg.ru/

Maloserdobinsky District (Russian: Малосердо́бинский райо́н) is an administrative and municipal district (raion), one of the twenty-seven in Penza Oblast, Russia. It is located in the south of the oblast. The area of the district is 1,100 square kilometers (420 sq mi). Its administrative center is the rural locality (a selo) of Malaya Serdoba. Population: 9,824 (2010 Census); 11,412 (2002 Census); 12,450 (1989 Soviet census). The population of Malaya Serdoba accounts for 44.5% of the district's total population.

There are 22 settlements in the Maloserdobinsky district.

List of settlement in the Maloserdobinsky district
No.	Settlement	Population
1=	Alexandrovka=	2=
2=	Badrovka=	69=
3=	Bolshaya Chernavka	10=
4=	Druzhayevka=	296=
5=	Klyuchi=	458=
6=	Kolemas=	107=
7=	Komarovka=	4=
8=	Krugloye=	26=
9=	Lipovka=	317=
10=	Mayskoye=	401=
11=	Malaya Serdoba	4368=
12=	Maryevka=	315=
13=	Nikolayevka=	375=
14=	Novoye Demkino	376=
15=	Novoye Nazimkino	56=
16=	Novoye Slavkino	109=
17=	Ogarevka=	100=
18=	Sapolga=	498=
19=	Staroye Slavkino	845=
20=	Toploye	513=
21=	Chunaki=	517=
22=	Shingal=	62=

== Notable residents ==
- Feodor Gladkov (1883–1958), socialist realist writer
- Yuri Vechkasov (1948–2022), politician, born in the village of Novoye Demkino
