= Malaya Serdoba =

Rural locality in Penza Oblast, Russia

Malaya Serdoba Малая Сердоба
- Rural locality
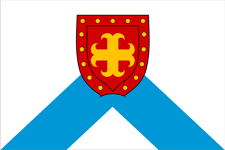
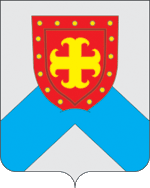
- Flag Coat of arms
- Interactive map of Malaya Serdoba
- Location of Malaya Serdoba Malaya Serdoba (Penza Oblast)
- Coordinates: 52°27′59″N 44°57′10″E
- Country: Russia
- Federal subject: Penza Oblast
- Administrative district: Maloserdobinsky
- Founded: 1697

Population (2010 Census)
  - Total: 4,368
  - Estimate (2021): 4,039 (−7.5%)
- Time zone: UTC+3 (MSK)
- Postal code: 442800
- OKTMO ID: 56644410101

Malaya Serdoba (Russian: Ма́лая Сердоба́) is a rural locality (a selo) and the administrative center of Maloserdobinsky District, Penza Oblast, Russia. Population: 4,368 (2010 census); 4,988 (2002 census); 5,028 (1989 Soviet census).

== Geography ==
It is located in a forest steppe area on the Serdoba and Sapolga, 110 kilometers south of Penza, 42 kilometers south of the Kolyshley railway station of the South Eastern Railway.

== History ==
The village was founded on November 5 [15], 1697, by Stanitsa Cossacks from Penza, Simbirsk and Saransk counties as a departing settlement of the city of Petrovsk. The center of the settlement at that time was a prison on a promontory between two ravines on the right bank of the Serdoba River. The first settlers carried out a watchdog service to ensure the safety of the construction of the city of Petrovsk.

In 1705, the first church was built in the Serdobinskaya Sloboda in the name of the heavenly patron of the Russian army, Archangel Michael. After the suppression of the Bulavinsky uprising, the stanichniki began to be officially called arable soldiers and odnodvorets. In 1711 and 1717, the settlement was destroyed twice during the Kuban pogroms, some of the inhabitants died and were taken prisoner. In 1751, a church of black—nosed peasants in the name of Nicholas the Wonderworker was consecrated in the village, after which two communities were formed in the settlement - Arkhangelsk and Nikolskaya. By 1797, the settlement had become one of the largest in the Saratov Volga region, the volost center of Petrovsky Uyezd. At the turn of the XVIII-XIX centuries, the peasants of Malaya Serdoba, by the verdict of the gathering, created several settlements on remote lands — Lipovka, Shingal, Abadim (Asmetovka) and Turzovka in order to prevent the expansion of the possessions of neighboring landlords at the expense of their lands. In March–May 1841, one of the largest potato riots in Russia took place in the village. In 1868, due to the large number of both communities, the complexity of land redistribution, as well as in connection with the development of self-government institutions, each community was divided into two: Mikhailovskaya — Gorskaya and Makarovskaya, Nikolskaya — Kuznetsovskaya and Sapolgovskaya. By 1896, 2 tanneries were founded; 2 military paramedics lived in the village.

In 1900, the building of the zemstvo school (now the courthouse) was built.

In the autumn of 1905, Malaya Serdoba became the largest center of the peasant revolution. There was an armed combat squad that destroyed the landlords' savings, the courtyards of rich peasants and rural administration. The squad produced leaflets on the hectograph.

In the early 1910s, the construction of the Kuznetsk-Balashov railway was undertaken, but the outbreak of war prevented the completion of its construction. On the north-eastern outskirts of the village, the station building and the two-storey railway service building have been preserved.

In 1911, there were 1,661 yards in the village, 12 thousand hectares of allotment arable land, including 51.5% under rye, 20% under oats, 12.6% under millet, 3.2% under sunflower; 2016 working horses, 1973 cows, 11.3 thousand sheep, 360 pigs; 418 iron plows, 2 harvesters, 15 threshing machines, 188 winnowers; 2 churches, 2 parish schools, 2 zemstvo schools, a hospital, a veterinary point, a post office, a bazaar, a fair.

In 1920–1927, the peasants of Malaya Serdoba organized 3 settlements in remote fields that remained after 1939 as part of the Saratov region: Shashkino, Zhulevsky, Leninsky.

Soviet power was established peacefully in December 1917. During the Civil War, Malaya Serdoba, a frontline village, on March 28, 1921, was occupied for three days by an anti-Bolshevik brigade of Don Cossacks under the leadership of a former red commander, awarded the Order of the Red Banner, Fyodor Popov. In the summer of the same year in the vicinity of the village there were heavy battles with the Antonovites using artillery.

Since July 23, 1928 — the district center of the Saratov district of the Lower Volga Region. In 1930, mass collectivization and demographic catastrophe began in Malaya Serdoba, caused by violent methods of its implementation. On March 7, 1930, 497 people were on the list of families subject to dispossession. In 1933, at least 250 people died from hunger in the village. As a result, from 1929 to 1935, the population of Malaya Serdoba decreased by 2,500 people.

In the 1930s and 40s, 4 collective farms operated in the village: Mikhailovsky "Smychka", Makarovsky "Lenin's Memory", Kuznetsovsky "The First Way" and Sapolgovsky "Lenin's Thought".

In 1938, there were 1,400 households in Malaya Serdoba, a power plant with a capacity of 10 kW was operating (electricity was supplied to 14 houses); cooperative leather (shoemaking), sewing, woodworking artels operated, a bakery with a stove of 2 tons of bread per day, a mill, 8 shops, a tea (canteen); MTS had at its disposal 106 tractors with a total capacity of 1,750 hp; 5 schools, 1,450 students, a kindergarten and a nursery (each for 25 children); a house of culture for 348 seats, a library; the district newspaper "Commune" was published with a circulation of 1,250 copies; a pharmacy, children. consultation, outpatient clinic, hospital with 36 beds, malaria point; household services were provided by a hotel (a collective farmer's house) with 15 beds, a bathhouse with 30 beds, a barber shop.

During the World War 2, most men went to the front, providing the army with food fell into the hands of women and teenagers.

In the early 1960s, widespread electrification began.

Administrative and territorial reforms of the 1960s, the abolition of the Maloserdobinsky district adversely affected the economic and socio-cultural development of the village. The consolidation of collective farms did not add to the efficiency of public production, and the population decreased from 5,000 in 1959 to 4,000 in 1970, which led to a shortage of workers. The restoration of the district improved the demographic situation, and from 1970 to 1989 the population of Malaya Serdoba increased by 10%. During this period, the problem of roads was solved, a gasification program was launched, landscaping was launched, and a music school was opened in September 1972. A number of new streets have appeared in the village, labor productivity in agriculture has increased.

In 1993, a mobile mechanized column "Gidrostroy", a road construction site, a creamery, a brick factory, a sausage shop, a bakery, a household house, a printing house, a mill, 2 churns, a pioneer house, a stadium, a bus station operated in the village. The central district hospital with 110 beds, a house of culture with a cinema hall, a library, an art school, and a municipal museum of local lore worked successfully. 772 students were educated at the F.V. Gladkov Secondary School, 70 at the N.E. Kushev Primary School.

With the collapse of the USSR, agriculture in the countryside faded away, the migration of residents to cities began, and the aging of the population became more and more apparent.

Since the 2010s, there have been signs of the revival of the village, the harbingers of this were the commissioning of new socio-cultural and sports facilities (a sports complex, a swimming pool, a sports ground, two parks), the return of abandoned lands to circulation.
