= Suprematism =

Early-20th-century Russian art movement

Suprematist art
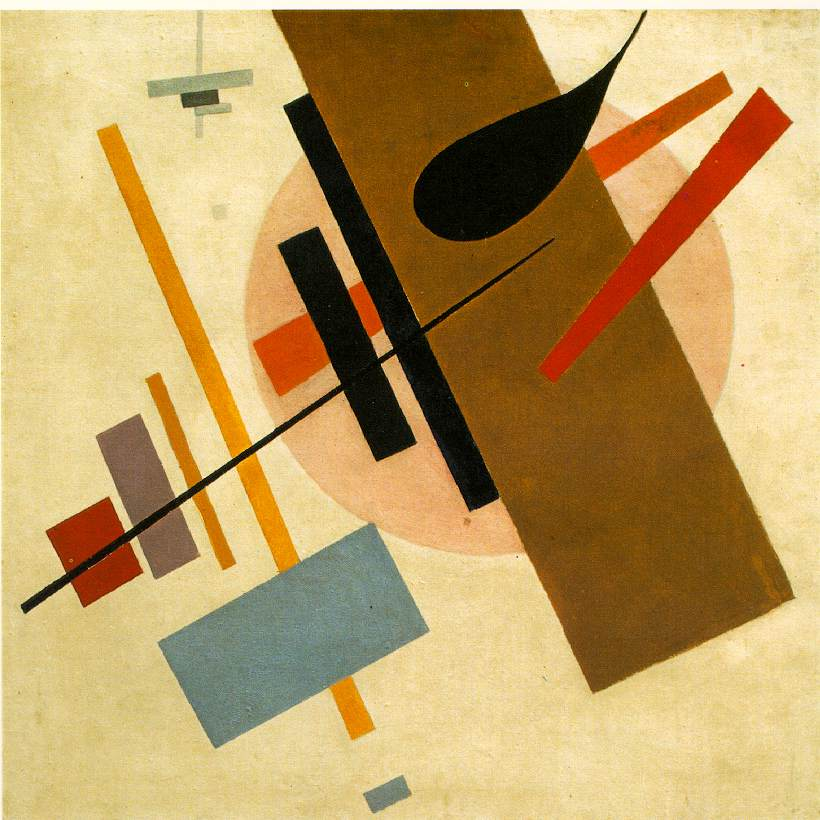
- Kazimir Malevich's Suprematism, 1916–17, Krasnodar Museum of Art
- Location: Russian Empire; Soviet Union
- Major figures: Kazimir Malevich
- Influences: Cubism; Futurism; P. D. Ouspensky
- Influenced: Bauhaus; De Stijl

Suprematism (Russian: супремати́зм) is an early 20th-century art movement focused on the fundamentals of geometry (circles, squares, rectangles), painted in a limited range of colors. The term suprematism refers to an abstract art based upon "the supremacy of pure artistic feeling" rather than on the figurative depiction of real-life subjects.

Founded by Russian artist Kazimir Malevich in 1913, Supremus (Russian: Супремус) conceived of the artist as liberated from everything that predetermined the ideal structure of life and art. Projecting that vision onto Cubism, which Malevich admired for its ability to deconstruct art, and in the process change its reference points of art, he led a group of Russian avant-garde artists—including Aleksandra Ekster, Liubov Popova, Olga Rozanova, Ivan Kliun, Ivan Puni, Nadezhda Udaltsova, Nina Genke-Meller, Ksenia Boguslavskaya and others—in what has been described as the first attempt to independently found a Russian avant-garde movement, seceding from the trajectory of prior Russian art history.

To support the movement, Malevich established the journal Supremus (initially titled Nul or Nothing), which received contributions from artists and philosophers. The publication, however, never took off and its first issue was never distributed due to the Russian Revolution. The movement itself, however, was announced in Malevich's 1915 Last Futurist Exhibition of Paintings 0,10, in St. Petersburg, where he, and several others in his group, exhibited 36 works in a similar style.

== Birth of the movement ==
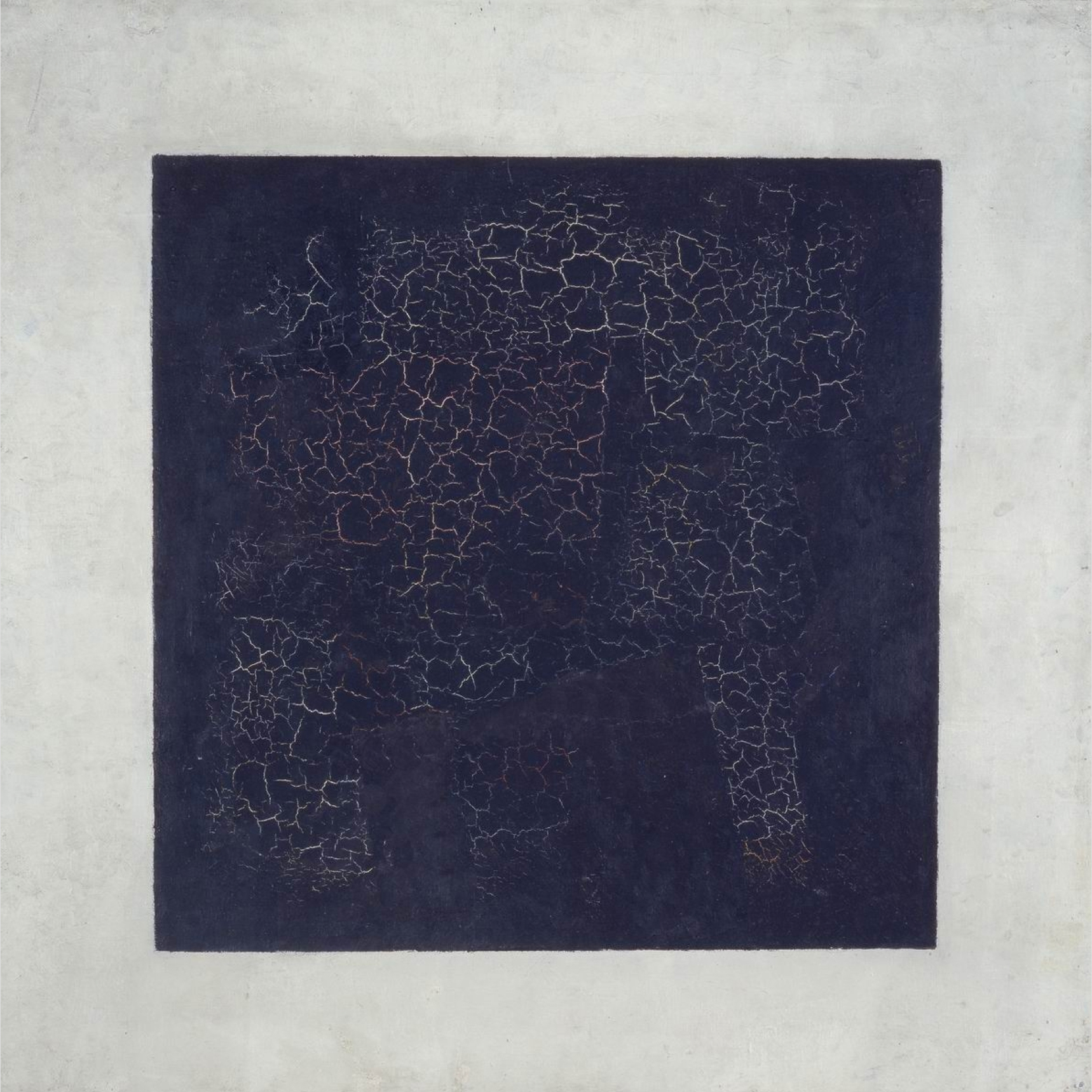
Kazimir Malevich, Black Square, 1915, oil on linen, 79.5 × 79.5 cm, Tretyakov Gallery, Moscow

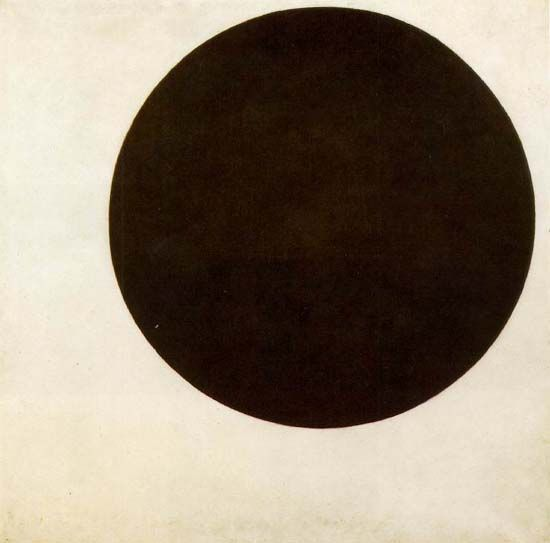
Kazimir Malevich, Black Circle, motive 1915, painted 1924, oil on canvas, 106.4 × 106.4 cm, State Russian Museum, St. Petersburg

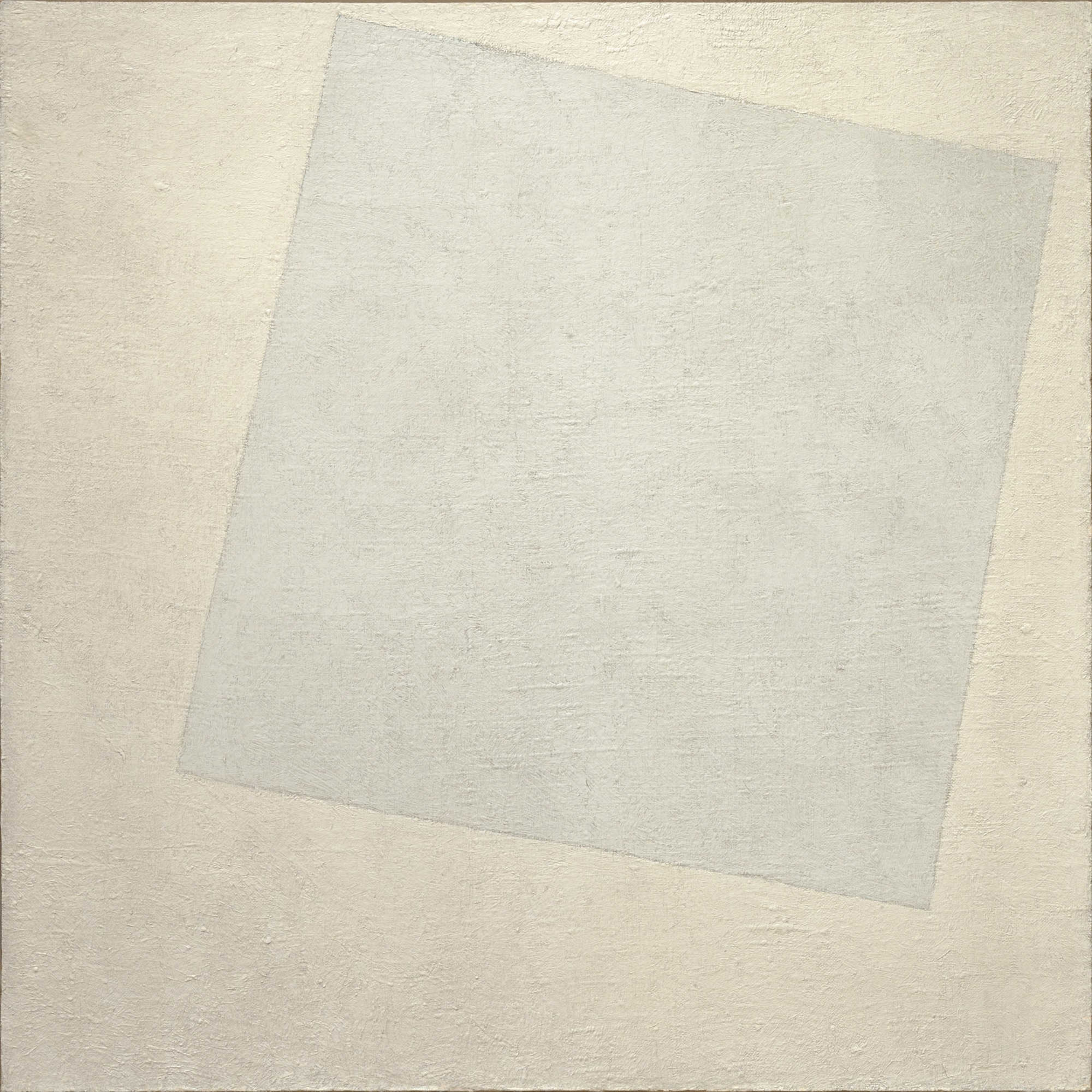
Kazimir Malevich, Suprematist Composition – White on White, 1918, Museum of Modern Art, New York

Kazimir Malevich developed the concept of Suprematism when he was already an established painter, having exhibited in the Donkey's Tail and the Der Blaue Reiter (The Blue Rider) exhibitions of 1912 with cubo-futurist works. The proliferation of new artistic forms in painting, poetry and theatre as well as a revival of interest in the traditional folk art of Russia provided a rich environment in which a Modernist culture was born.

In "Suprematism" (Part II of his book The Non-Objective World, which was published 1927 in Munich as Bauhaus Book No. 11), Malevich clearly stated the core concept of Suprematism:

Under Suprematism I understand the primacy of pure feeling in creative art. To the Suprematist, the visual phenomena of the objective world are, in themselves, meaningless; the significant thing is feeling, as such, quite apart from the environment in which it is called forth.

He created a suprematist "grammar" based on fundamental geometric forms; in particular, the square and the circle. In the 0.10 Exhibition in 1915, Malevich exhibited his early experiments in suprematist painting. The centerpiece of his show was the Black Square, placed in what is called the red/beautiful corner in Russian Orthodox tradition; the place of the main icon in a house. "Black Square" was painted in 1915 and was presented as a breakthrough in his career and in art in general. Malevich also painted White on White which was also heralded as a milestone. White on White marked a shift from polychrome to monochrome Suprematism.

== Difference from Constructivism ==
Malevich's Suprematism is fundamentally opposed to the postrevolutionary positions of Constructivism and materialism. Constructivism, with its cult of the object, is concerned with utilitarian strategies of adapting art to the principles of functional organization. Under Constructivism, the traditional easel painter is transformed into the artist-as-engineer in charge of organizing life in all of its aspects.

Suprematism, in sharp contrast to Constructivism, embodies a profoundly anti-materialist, anti-utilitarian philosophy. In "Suprematism" (Part II of The Non-Objective World), Malevich writes:

Art no longer cares to serve the state and religion, it no longer wishes to illustrate the history of manners, it wants to have nothing further to do with the object, as such, and believes that it can exist, in and for itself, without "things" (that is, the "time-tested well-spring of life").

Jean-Claude Marcadé has observed that "Despite superficial similarities between Constructivism and Suprematism, the two movements are nevertheless antagonists and it is very important to distinguish between them." According to Marcadé, confusion has arisen because several artists—either directly associated with Suprematism such as El Lissitzky or working under the suprematist influence as did Rodchenko and Lyubov Popova—later abandoned Suprematism for the culture of materials.

Suprematism does not embrace a humanist philosophy which places man at the center of the universe. Rather, Suprematism envisions man—the artist—as both originator and transmitter of what for Malevich is the world's only true reality—that of absolute non-objectivity.

...a blissful sense of liberating non-objectivity drew me forth into a "desert", where nothing is real except feeling...

— "Suprematism", Part II of The Non-Objective World

For Malevich, it is upon the foundations of absolute non-objectivity that the future of the universe will be built - a future in which appearances, objects, comfort, and convenience no longer dominate.

== Influences on the movement ==
Malevich also credited the birth of Suprematism to Victory Over the Sun, Kruchenykh's Futurist opera production for which he designed the sets and costumes in 1913. The aim of the artists involved was to break with the usual theater of the past and to use a "clear, pure, logical Russian language". Malevich put this to practice by creating costumes from simple materials and thereby took advantage of geometric shapes. Flashing headlights illuminated the figures in such a way that alternating hands, legs or heads disappeared into the darkness. The stage curtain was a black square. One of the drawings for the backcloth shows a black square divided diagonally into a black and a white triangle. Because of the simplicity of these basic forms they were able to signify a new beginning.

Another important influence on Malevich were the ideas of the Russian mystic, philosopher, and disciple of Georges Gurdjieff, P. D. Ouspensky, who wrote of "a fourth dimension or a Fourth Way beyond the three to which our ordinary senses have access".

Some of the titles to paintings in 1915 express the concept of a non-Euclidean geometry which imagined forms in movement, or through time; titles such as: Two dimensional painted masses in the state of movement. These give some indications towards an understanding of the Suprematic compositions produced between 1915 and 1918.

== The Supremus journal ==
The Supremus group, which in addition to Malevich included Aleksandra Ekster, Olga Rozanova, Nadezhda Udaltsova, Ivan Kliun, Lyubov Popova, Lazar Khidekel, Nikolai Suetin, Ilya Chashnik, Nina Genke-Meller, Ivan Puni and Ksenia Boguslavskaya, met from 1915 onwards to discuss the philosophy of Suprematism and its development into other areas of intellectual life. The products of these discussions were to be documented in a monthly publication called Supremus, titled to reflect the art movement it championed, that would include painting, music, decorative art, and literature. Malevich conceived of the journal as the contextual foundation in which he could base his art, and originally planned to call the journal Nul. In a letter to a colleague, he explained:

We are planning to put out a journal and have begun to discuss the how and what of it. Since in it we intend to reduce everything to zero, we have decided to call it Nul. Afterward we ourselves will go beyond zero.

Malevich conceived of the journal as a space for experimentation that would test his theory of nonobjective art. The group of artists wrote several articles for the initial publication, including the essays "The Mouth of the Earth and the Artist" (Malevich), "On the Old and the New in Music" (Matiushin), "Cubism, Futurism, Suprematism" (Rozanova), "Architecture as a Slap in the Face to Ferroconcrete" (Malevich), and "The Declaration of the Word as Such" (Kruchenykh). However, despite a year spent planning and writing articles for the journal, the first issue of Supremus was never published.

== El Lissitzky: Bridge to the West ==
The most important artist who took the art form and ideas developed by Malevich and popularized them abroad was the painter El Lissitzky. Lissitzky worked intensively with Suprematism particularly in the years 1919 to 1923. He was deeply impressed by Malevich's Suprematist works as he saw it as the theoretical and visual equivalent of the social upheavals taking place in Russia at the time. Suprematism, with its radicalism, was to him the creative equivalent of an entirely new form of society. Lissitzky transferred Malevich's approach to his Proun constructions, which he himself described as "the station where one changes from painting to architecture". The Proun designs, however, were also an artistic break from Suprematism; the Black Square by Malevich was the end point of a rigorous thought process that required new structural design work to follow. Lissitzky saw this new beginning in his Proun constructions, where the term "Proun" (Pro Unovis) symbolized its Suprematist origins.

Lissitzky exhibited in Berlin in 1923 at the Hanover and Dresden showrooms of Non-Objective Art. During this trip to the West, El Lissitzky was in close contact with Theo van Doesburg, forming a bridge between Suprematism and De Stijl and the Bauhaus.

== Architecture ==
Lazar Khidekel (1904–1986), Suprematist artist and visionary architect, was the only Suprematist architect who emerged from the Malevich circle. Khidekel started his study in architecture in Vitebsk art school under El Lissitzky in 1919–20. He was instrumental in the transition from planar Suprematism to volumetric Suprematism, creating axonometric projections (The Aero-club: Horizontal architecton, 1922–23), making three-dimensional models, such as the architectons, designing objects (model of an "Ashtray", 1922–23), and producing the first Suprematist architectural project (The Workers' Club, 1926). In the mid-1920s, he began his journey into the realm of visionary architecture. Directly inspired by Suprematism and its notion of an organic form-creation continuum, he explored new philosophical, scientific and technological futuristic approaches, and proposed innovative solutions for the creation of new urban environments, where people would live in harmony with nature and would be protected from man-made and natural disasters (his still topical proposal for flood protection – the City on the Water, 1925).

Nikolai Suetin used Suprematist motifs on works at the Imperial Porcelain Factory, Saint Petersburg where Malevich and Chashnik were also employed, and Malevich designed a Suprematist teapot. The Suprematists also made architectural models in the 1920s, which offered a different conception of socialist buildings to those developed in Constructivist architecture.

Malevich's architectural projects were known after 1922 Arkhitektoniki. Designs emphasized the right angle, with similarities to De Stijl and Le Corbusier, and were justified with an ideological connection to communist governance and equality for all. Another part of the formalism was low regard for triangles which were "dismissed as ancient, pagan, or Christian".

The first Suprematist architectural project was created by Lazar Khidekel in 1926. In the mid-1920s to 1932 Lazar Khidekel also created a series of futuristic projects such as Aero-City, Garden-City, and City Over Water.

In the 21st century, architect Zaha Hadid had 'a particular interest [in] the Russian avant-garde, and the movement known as Constructivism,' and 'as part of their work on the Russian avant-garde, Hadid's unit studied Suprematism, the abstract movement founded by the painter Kazimir Malevich.'.

== Social context ==
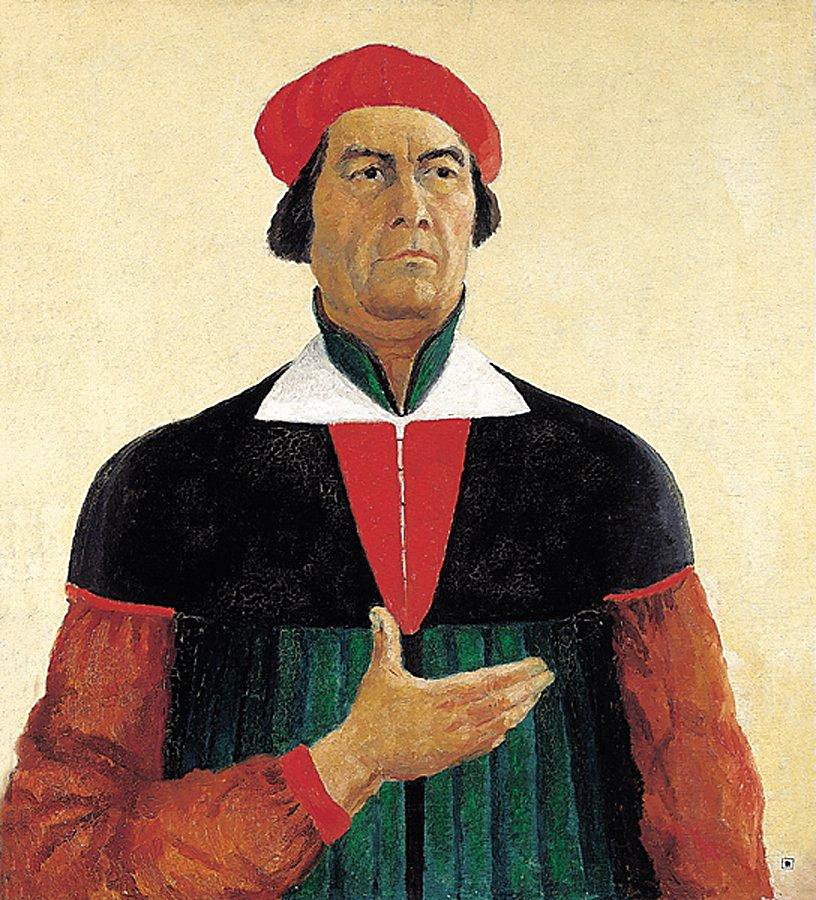
Malevich, Self-Portrait, 1933

This development in artistic expression came about when Russia was in a revolutionary state, ideas were in ferment, and the old order was being swept away. As the new order became established, and Stalinism took hold from 1924 on, the state began limiting the freedom of artists. From the late 1920s the Russian avant-garde experienced direct and harsh criticism from the authorities and in 1934 the doctrine of Socialist Realism became official policy, and prohibited abstraction and divergence of artistic expression. Malevich nevertheless retained his main conception. In his self-portrait of 1933 he represented himself in a traditional way—the only way permitted by Stalinist cultural policy—but signed the picture with a tiny black-over-white square.

== Notable exhibitions ==
=== Historic exhibitions ===
- Exhibition of Modern Decorative Art at Lemercier Gallery, Moscow, 1915
- The Last Futurist Exhibition of Paintings 0.10 at Galerie Dobychina, Petrograd, 1915
- First Russian Art Exhibition at Galerie Van Diemen, Berlin, 1922
- First State Exhibition of Local and Moscow Artists, Vitebsk, 1919
- Exhibition of Paintings by Petrograd Artists of All Trends, 1918–1923, Petrograd, 1923

=== Retrospective exhibitions ===
- The Great Utopia: The Russian and Soviet Avant-Garde, 1915–1932 at the Solomon R. Guggenheim Museum, New York, 1992
- Malevich's Circle. Confederates. Students. Followers in Russia 1920s-1950s at The State Russian Museum, St. Petersburg, 2000
- Kazimir Malevich: Suprematism at the Solomon R. Guggenheim Museum, New York, 2003
- Zaha Hadid and Suprematism at Galerie Gmurzynska, Zürich, 2010
- Lazar Khidekel: Surviving Suprematism at Judah L. Magnes Museum, Berkeley CA, 2004–2005
- Lazar Markovich Khidekel – the Rediscovered Suprematist at House Konstruktiv, Zurich, 2010–2011
- Kazimir Malevich and the Russian Avant-Garde at the Stedelijk Museum, Amsterdam, 2013
- Malevich: Revolutionary of Russian Art at the Tate Modern, London, 2014
- Floating Worlds and Future Cities. Genius of Lazar Khidekel, Suprematism and Russian Avant-garde. NYC, 2013

== Artists associated with Suprematism ==
- Kazimir Malevich
- El Lissitzky
- Ilya Chashnik
- Lazar Khidekel
- Anna Kogan
- Alexandra Exter
- Lyubov Popova
- Sergei Senkin

== References and sources ==
Sources

- Kasimir Malevich, The Non-Objective World. English translation by Howard Dearstyne from the German translation of 1927 by A. von Riesen from Malevich's original Russian manuscript, Paul Theobald and Company, Chicago, 1959.
- Camilla Gray, The Russian Experiment in Art, Thames and Hudson, 1976.
- Mel Gooding, Abstract Art, Tate Publishing, 2001.
- Jean-Claude Marcadé, "What is Suprematism?", from the exhibition catalogue, Kasimir Malewitsch zum 100. Geburtstag, Galerie Gmurzynska, Cologne, 1978.
