= Nikolai Suetin =

Russian Suprematist artist

- Born: Nikolai Mikhailovich Suetin; 25 October 1897; Myatlevo, Russian Empire
- Died: 22 January 1954 (aged 56); Leningrad, Soviet Union
- Education: Vitebsk Higher Institute of Art
- Years active: 1915-1954
- Movement: Suprematism

Nikolai Suetin (Note: Russian: Николай Суетин) (25 October 1897 – 22 January 1954) was a Russian Suprematist artist. He worked as a graphic artist, a designer, and a ceramics painter.

== Life ==
Suetin was born Nikolai Mikhailovich Suetin on 25 October 1897, to an impoverished family in the village of Myatlevo within the province of Kaluga. After graduating from the Kaluga gymnasium, Suetin joined the cadet corps in St Petersburg, where he fell in love with painting and art. His favourite artists at the time included Mikhail Vrubel and Mikalojus Konstantinas Čiurlionis. Following the outbreak of the First World War, Suetin was mobilized, initially to the Caucases before being relocated to Vitebsk in 1915.

Suetin studied at the Vitebsk Higher Institute of Art, (1918–1922) under Kazimir Malevich, founder of Suprematism, an early abstract art movement which developed a style based on 'non objective' geometric shapes in alignment. From 1920 the artist participated in exhibitions including those of the UNOVIS group (Vitebsk, 1920 and 1921; Moscow 1929, 1921 and 1922), Petrograd exhibitions, an International Exhibition of Decorative Art (held in Paris, 1925), the Exhibition of Soviet Porcelain (1926 and 1927), and the First Exhibition of Leningrad artists in the Russian Museum among others.

He lived in Petrograd from 1923, and worked at the State Lomonosov Ceramics Factory. He also worked at the State Petrograd Lomonossov Porcelain Plant (from 1922 until 1924), and at the Porcelain Plant in Government of Novgorod (from 1924 until 1925). Suetin was a member of GINKhUK (the State Institute of Artistic Culture, from 1923 until 1926), where he worked at the experimental laboratory; then later at the Institute of Art History (from 1927 to 1930). From 1932 he was the Chief Artist at the artistic laboratory of the Leningrad Lomonossov Porcelain Plant, where he had been working for around a decade applying avant-garde patterns and artworks to porcelain. He also worked as a book illustrator and exhibitions designer, where he maintained an avant-garde style despite the demands of Socialist Realism. Suetin was the chief artist and designer of the USSR pavilions for the 1937 Paris Exhibition, where he worked on the interiors for Boris Iofan's Stalinist pavilion and again at the 1939 New York World's Fair.

Nikolai Suetin is generally considered one of the leading Suprematist artists.
