= 1915 in art =

Events from the year 1915 in art.

== Events ==
- May – Ambrose Heal and others found the Design and Industries Association in London.
- c. May – Publication of the first modern book illustrated with wood engravings, Frances Cornford's Spring Morning (published by The Poetry Bookshop, London) with engravings by the poet's cousin Gwen Raverat.
- June 10 – The only contemporary Vorticist exhibition staged opens at the Doré Gallery in London.
- October 24 – Giovanni Battista Tiepolo's frescos, Translation of the House of Loreto, in the Church of the Scalzi (Venice) are destroyed by an Austrian bombardment.
- December 19 – Kasimir Malevich stages the 0.10 Exhibition and originates Suprematism.
- Pierre Bodard serves with the French Army on Martinique.
- Marcel Duchamp begins producing readymades
- Harper's Bazaar hires Erté to design its covers.
- Edward McKnight Kauffer is given his first commission to design a poster for the Underground Electric Railways Company of London.
- Shōzaburō Watanabe originates shin-hanga collaborative woodblock printing in Japan.
- The first of the 'Etruscan terracotta warriors', forged by sculptor Alfredo Fioravanti with the Riccardi family, is purchased by the Metropolitan Museum of Art in New York City.
- 14-year-old Alice Prin ("Kiki de Montparnasse") is posing (nude) for sculptors in Paris.

== Works ==
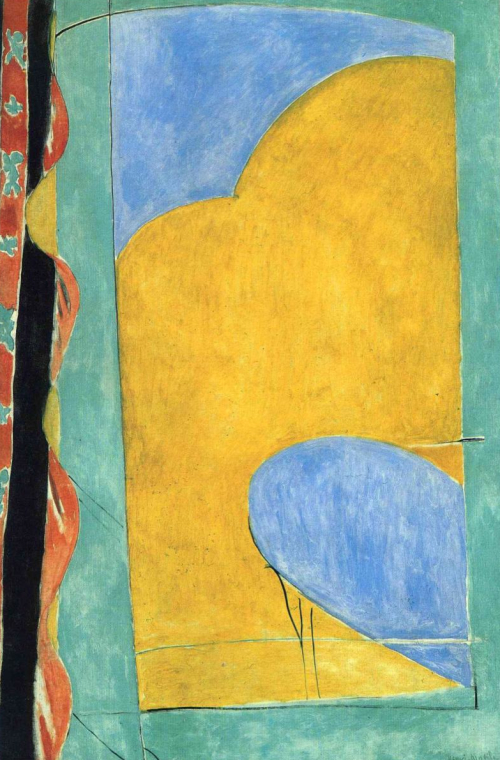
Matisse – Le rideau jaune

- George Bellows – Riverfront No. 1
- Frank Weston Benson – Red and Gold
- Umberto Boccioni
  - Charge of the Lancers
  - Horizontal Volumes
- Marc Chagall – The Poet Reclining
- William Merritt Chase – Self-portrait
- Giorgio de Chirico
  - The Double Dream of Spring
  - The Evil Genius of a King
  - Portrait of Paul Guillaume
  - The Seer
- Jacob Epstein – bust of Admiral Lord Fisher
- Albert Gleizes
  - Brooklyn Bridge
  - Composition for "Jazz"
  - Portrait of an Army Doctor
- J. W. Godward – In The Prime Of The Summer Time
- Juan Gris
  - The Breakfast
  - Still Life with Checked Tablecloth
  - Still Life with a Poem
- Alexandre Jacovleff – The Violinist
- Eric Kennington - The Kensingtons at Laventie
- Ernst Ludwig Kirchner
  - Brandenburger Tor
  - The Red Tower in Halle
  - Self-portrait as a Soldier
- Gustav Klimt – Death and Life
- Carl Larsson – Midvinterblot
- Wyndham Lewis – The Crowd
- Kazimir Malevich
  - Black Cross
  - Black Square
  - Red Square
- Henri Matisse – The Yellow Curtain
- Jean Metzinger – Soldier at a Game of Chess
- Amedeo Modigliani
  - Beatrice Hastings in Front of a Door
  - Portrait of Pablo Picasso
  - Portrait of the Painter Moisè Kisling
- Piet Mondrian – Composition No. 10 Pier and Ocean
- C. R. W. Nevinson
  - Bursting Shell
  - La Mitrailleuse
  - Returning to the Trenches (approximate date)
- Pablo Picasso –
  - Harlequin (1915)
  - Musical Instruments
  - Still Life with Compote and Glass
- Pierre-Auguste Renoir – Blond Girl with a Rose
- Diego Rivera – Portrait of Ramón Gómez de la Serna
- Isaac Rosenberg – Self-portrait
- Ladislav Šaloun – Jan Hus Memorial (Prague)
- John Singer Sargent – Tyrolese Interior
- Egon Schiele
  - Death and the Maiden
  - Portrait of Edith (the artist's wife)
- Helene Schjerfbeck – Self-portrait with black background
- Kathleen Scott – statue of her late husband, Robert Falcon Scott in London
- Zinaida Serebriakova – Harvest
- Walter Sickert – Brighton Pierrots
- Fred Spear – Enlist (poster)
- Stewart–Screven Monument
- Paul Strand – Wall Street (photograph)
- John William Waterhouse – I Am Half-Sick of Shadows, Said the Lady of Shalott
- Max Weber - Chinese Restaurant
- W. L. Wyllie – The track of Lusitania: view of casualties and survivors in the water and in lifeboats
- Konstantin Yuon – March Sun
- Anders Zorn – Self-portrait in Red

== Births ==
- January 3 – Jack Levine, American Social Realist painter and printmaker (d. 2010)
- January 15 – Leo Mol, Ukrainian-born Canadian artist, sculptor (d. 2009)
- January 24 – Robert Motherwell, American abstract expressionist painter and printmaker (d. 1991).
- February 4 – Virginia Admiral, American painter and poet (d. 2000)
- February 11 – Mervyn Levy, Welsh artist and critic (d. 1996).
- March 10 – Harry Bertoia, Italian-born American artist and furniture designer (d. 1978).
- March 19 – Maria Austria (née Marie Karoline Oeststreicher) Austro-Dutch photographer and photojournalist) (d. 1979).
- April 4 – Louis Archambault, Canadian sculptor (d. 2003).
- April 6 – Tadeusz Kantor, Polish painter, Assemblage artist, set designer and theatre director (d. 1990)
- April 10 – Wynona Mulcaster, Canadian painter and teacher (d. 2016)
- April 15 – Elizabeth Catlett, African-American graphic artist and sculptor (d. 2012)
- April 17 – William Pachner, Czech painter (d. 2017)
- May 3 – Richard Lippold, American sculptor (d. 2002)
- May 20 – Sam Golden, American paint maker (d. 1997)
- May 31 – Carmen Herrera, Cuban-American abstract minimalist visual artist (d. 2022).
- June 7 – Graham Ingels, American illustrator (d. 1991)
- June 11 – José Caballero, Spanish artist (d. 1991)
- June 17 – Gunther Gerzso, Mexican abstract painter (d. 2000)
- June 23 – Frances Gabe, American artist and inventor (d. 2016)
- July 8 – Malvina Cheek, British artist (d. 2016)
- July 15
  - Edith Pfau, American painter, sculptor and art educator (d. 2001)
  - Judith Révész, Hungarian-Dutch potter and sculptor (d. 2018)
- July 19 – Åke Hellman, Finnish still life and portrait painter (d. 2017)
- July 28 – Dick Sprang, American comic book artist (d. 2000)
- August 6 – Stefan Kanchev, Bulgarian graphic artist (d. 2001)
- August 14 – Mary Fedden, English painter (d. 2012)
- August 28
  - Patrick Hennessy, Irish painter (d. 1980)
  - Tasha Tudor, American illustrator and author of children's books (d. 2008)
- September 17 – M. F. Husain, Indian artist (d. 2011)
- September 19 – Duffy Ayers, English portrait painter (d. 2017)
- October 13
  - Terry Frost, English Abstract artist (d. 2003)
  - Ricco (born Erich Wassmer), Swiss painter (d. 1972)
- October 24 – Bob Kane, American comic book artist and writer (d. 1998)
- November 9 – André François, French cartoonist (d. 2005)
- November 26 – Inge King, German-born Australian sculptor (d. 2016)
- November 28 – Evald Okas, Estonian painter (d. 2011)

== Deaths ==
- January 15 – Luigi Crosio, Italian painter (b. 1835)
- January 23 – Anne Whitney, American sculptor, poet (b. 1821)
- February 25 – Flaxman Charles John Spurrell, English archaeologist and photographer (b. 1842)
- April 3 – Nadežda Petrović, Serbian Fauvist painter (b. 1873)
- April 9 – Karl Bitter, Austrian American sculptor (b. 1867)
- May 7 – Sir Hugh Lane, Irish-born art dealer, collector and benefactor (b. 1875; killed in sinking of the RMS Lusitania)
- June 5 – Henri Gaudier-Brzeska, French artist and sculptor (killed in action) (b. 1891)
- June 7 – Hilda Sjölin, Swedish photographer (b. 1835)
- July 10 – Hendrik Willem Mesdag, Dutch marine painter (b. 1831)
- July 11 – Albert Schickedanz, Austro-Hungarian architect and painter in the Eclectic style (b. 1846)
- September 11 – Jens Birkholm, Danish genre and landscape painter (b. 1869)
- September 14 – Alfred Agache, French academic painter (b. 1843)
- October 24 – Désiré Charnay, French archaeologist and pioneer photographer (b. 1828)
- November 28 – Kobayashi Kiyochika, Japanese ukiyo-e painter and printmaker (b. 1847)
- December 22 – Arthur Hughes, English painter and illustrator (b. 1832)
- date unknown
  - Kikuchi Shingaku, Japanese photographer (b. 1832)
  - Krikor Torosian, Armenian illustrator (b. 1884; killed in Armenian genocide)
