= Black Square =

1915 painting by Kazimir Malevich

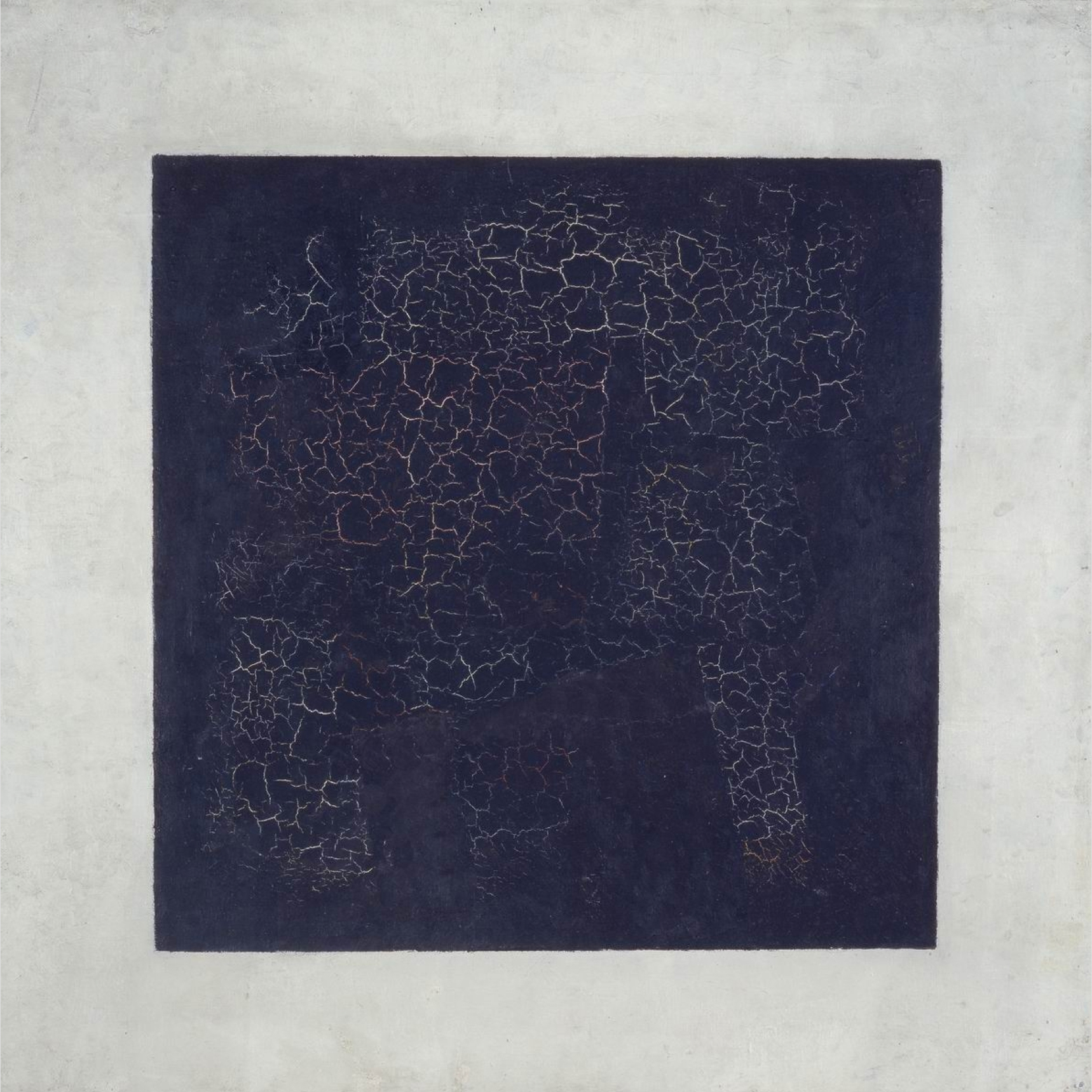
- Artist: Kazimir Malevich
- Year: 1915
- Medium: oil on canvas
- Dimensions: 79.5 cm × 79.5 cm (31.3 in × 31.3 in)
- Location: Tretyakov Gallery, Moscow

Black Square (Russian: Чёрный квадрат) is a 1915 oil on linen canvas painting by the Russian avant-garde artist and theorist Kazimir Malevich. There are four painted versions, the first of which was completed in 1915 and described by the artist as his breakthrough work and the inception of his Suprematist art movement (1915–1919).

In his manifesto for the Suprematist movement, Malevich stated that the paintings were intended as "a desperate struggle to free art from the ballast of the objective world" by focusing solely on form. He sought to create paintings that all could understand, and that would have an emotional impact comparable to religious works. The 1915 Black Square was the turning point in his career and defined the aesthetic he was to follow for the remainder of his career; his other significant paintings include variants such as White on White (1918), Black Circle (c. 1924), and Black Cross (c. 1920–23). Malevich painted three other versions in 1923, 1929, and between the late 1920s and early 1930s. Each version differs slightly in size and texture.

The original painting was first shown at The Last Futurist Exhibition 0,10 in 1915. The last is thought to have been painted during the late 1920s or early 1930s. Malevich described the 1915 painting as the "zero point of painting"; since then, it has significantly influenced minimalist art.

== Conception ==
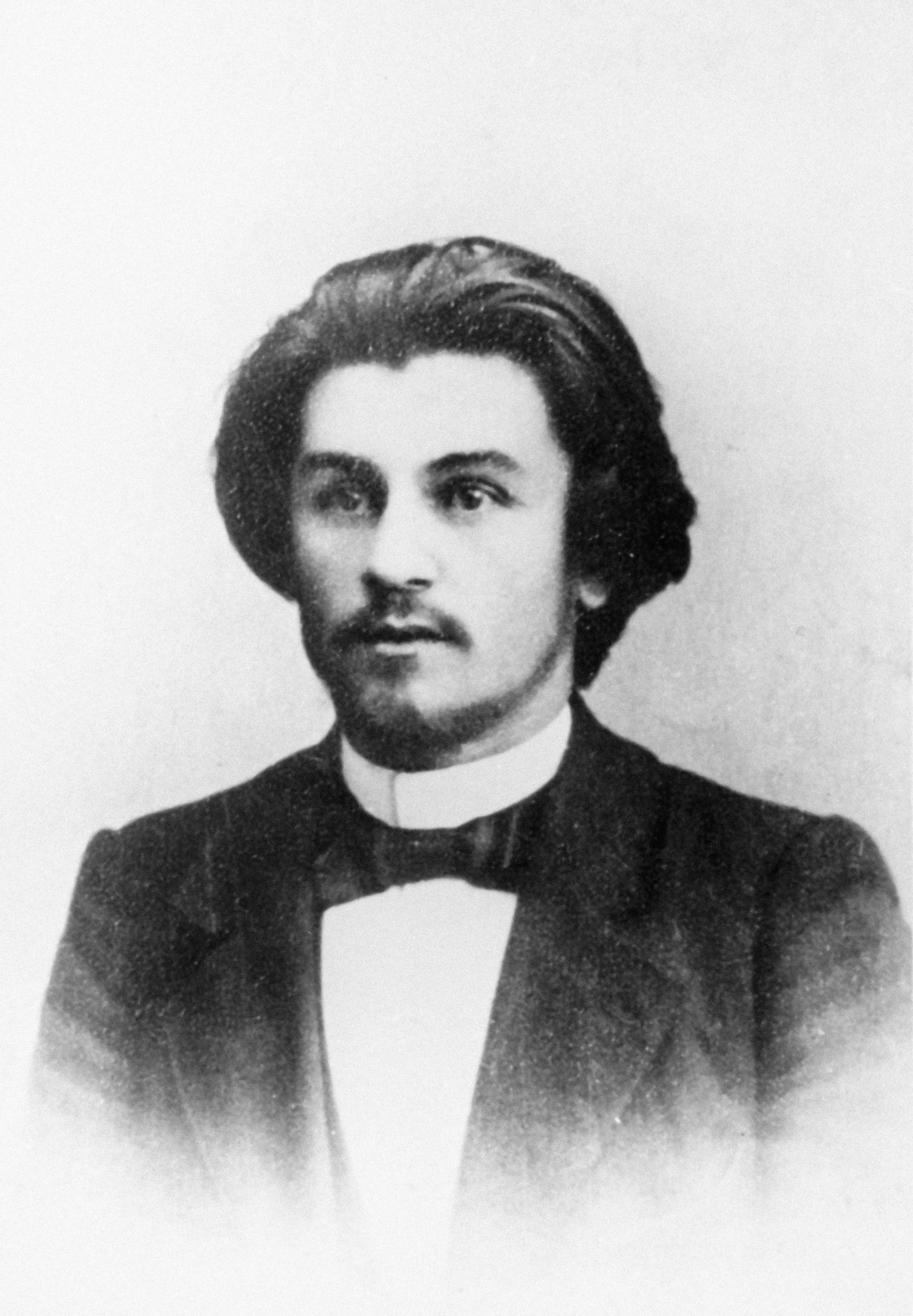
Malevich, c. 1900

A self-taught artist, Kazimir Malevich's early works, created while still a teenager, incorporate the style and motifs of Ukrainian and Russian folk art and Eastern Orthodox icons. In the early 1900s, when he was heavily influenced by late 19th-century Impressionism. He moved from his birthplace of Kiev (present-day Ukraine) to Moscow in 1907, where he came into contact with leading Russian avant-garde artists such as Natalia Goncharova and Mikhail Larionov.

He first used the motif of a black square while working as the stage designer for the premiere of the Cubo-Futuristic opera Victory over the Sun by the painter and composer Mikhail Matyushin's (1861–1934), staged at the Luna Park Theater in Saint Petersburg on 3 December 1913. Although the opera is ostensibly a comedic farce, the plot satirises the religious dogma and Tsarist autocracy then dominating pre-revolution Russia. Its libretto was written by the poet Velimir Khlebnikov (1885–1922), and follows protagonists seeking to "abolish reason" by capturing the sun and destroying time. The opera ends with a world in darkness, which Khlebnikov intended to represent a future after the destruction of Russian tradition. These ideas resonated with Malevich's year zero views on the purpose of contemporary Modernist art.

Malevich's sketches for the costumes seem largely influenced by Cubism and Futurism. However, a number, including those known today as Futurist Strongman, Grave Digger and A Certain Evil Intender, are in colour and contain distinct black squares and rectangles. During the pivotal scene depicting the death of the sun, black squares appear eight times: on a curtain and the backdrops, and on the coats and hats of the sun's pall bearers. He was immediately aware of the design's potential, wrote pleading letters to Matyushin to retain it when the composer was planning a 1915 performance of the opera. In the letters, Malevich claimed that the square "will have great significance in painting" and is the "embryo of all possibilities; in its development it acquires a terrible strength."

== Composition ==
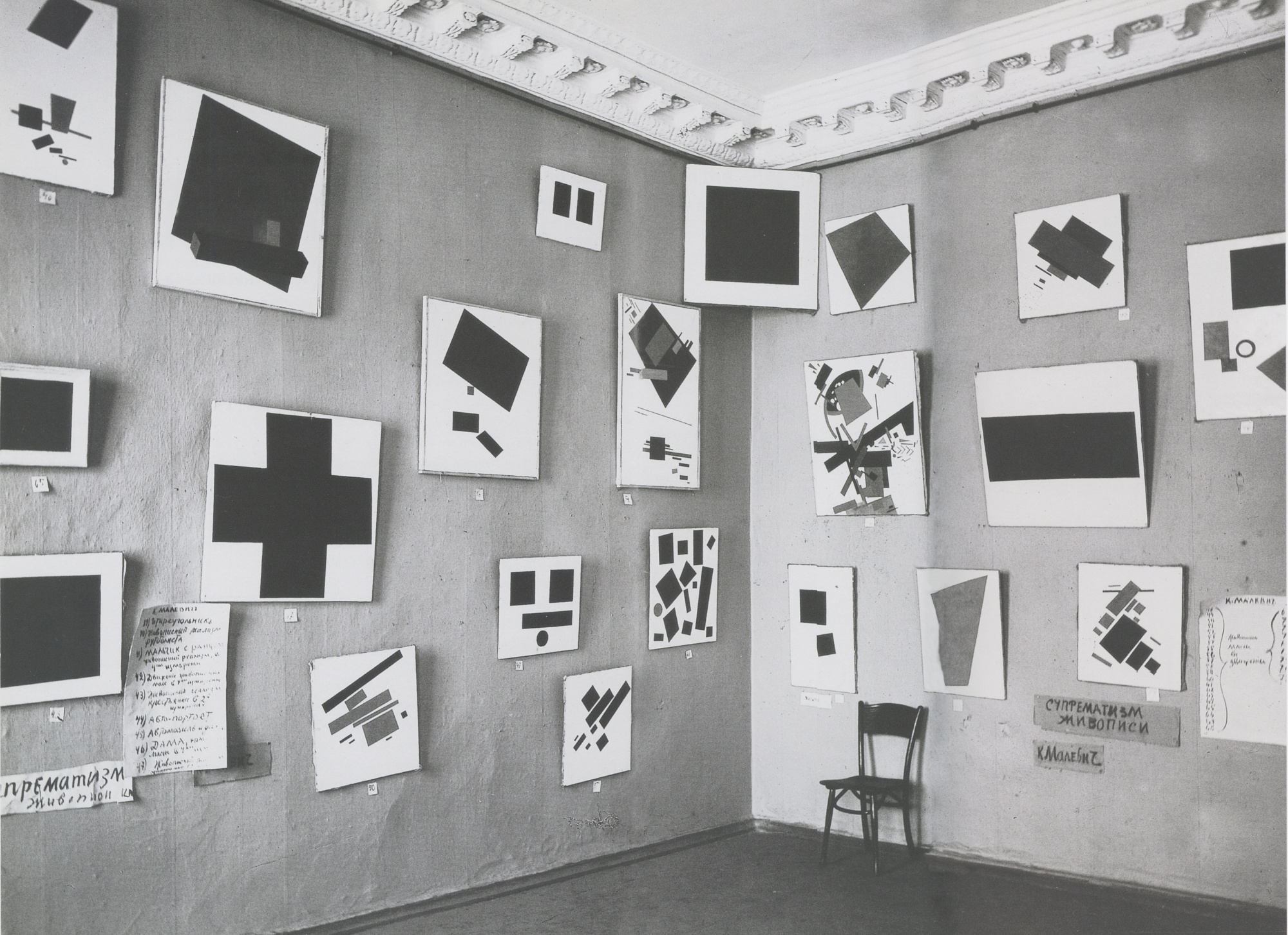
Suprematist works by Malevich at the 0,10 Exhibition, Saint Petersburg, 1915

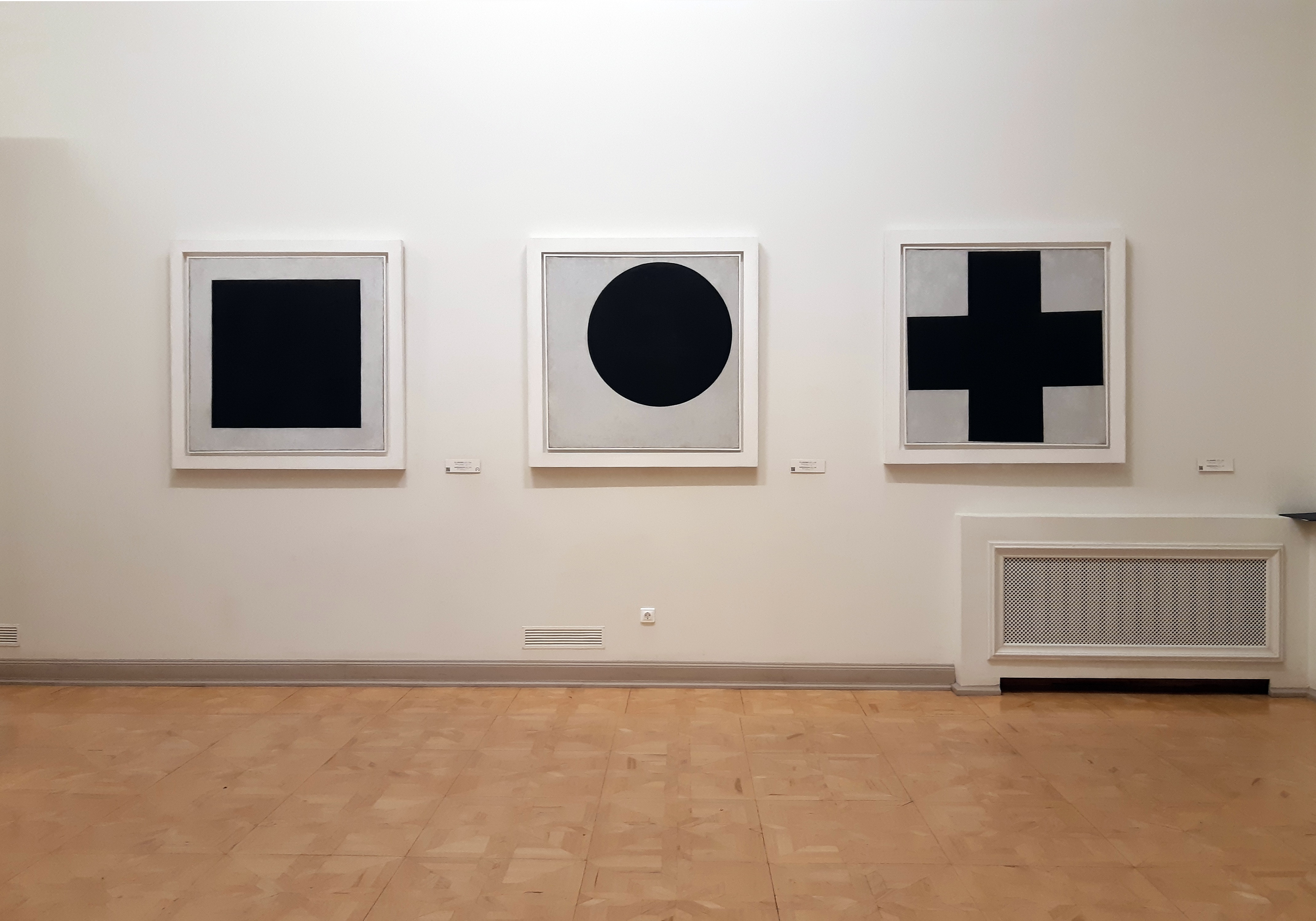
Triptych at the Russian Museum showing the 1924 version

Malevich created the first version in 1915 using broad strokes of thick black oil paint onto a 79.5 cm x 79.5 cm linen canvas. The border and edges were applied with various shades of white and grey paint.

Malevich was a prolific and talented self-publicist and has been described as both a "brilliant, grandiose, messianic figure" and a "fanatic pamphleteer". Sensing a breakthrough, he declared the painting as a milestone in both his oeuvre and "in the history of art". He later wrote that he was so excited at the breakthrough that he was unable to "sleep, eat, or drink for an entire week after".

The painting was first shown at the 1915 The Last Futurist Exhibition 0,10 at the Field of Mars square in Saint Petersburg (then Petrograd). Its hanging in the icon corner emphasised the collision between Modernism and traditional Eastern Orthodox culture. Over the following decades, Malevich made three other oil on canvas variants (in 1924, 1929, while the final version is thought to date from the late 1920s or early 1930s). He created numerous lithographs of the image, used it to decorate his signature, and applied it to lapels he gave to his students.

The reverse of the original painting contains the inscription "1913", however, this is thought to refer to the year of the design's conception that year for Victory over the Sun. He continued to refer to it as The main Suprematist element. Square. 1913. According to an overview of the work by Tate Modern, Malevich may have given an earlier date to appear more ahead of the curve during the early years of Abstract art.

In 2015, X-rays of Black Square revealed the existence of two previously undiscovered works under it. The first painting appears to have done in a brightly colored Cubo-Futurist style, then it was later painted over with what art researcher Yekaterina Voronina called a "proto-Suprematist composition. Also uncovered was a description that reads "Negroes battling in a cave." This could indicate that Malevich was replying to an earlier painting of a black square, which was created in 1897 by French writer and humorist Alphonse Allais. Allais titled his work "Combat des Negres dans une cave, pendant la nuit," or "Negroes fighting in a cellar at night,".

== Interpretation ==
Black Square is widely regarded by art historians as foundational in the development of both modern and abstract art. Malevich said the paintings began the Suprematism movement, which emphasised colour and shape. The title "Suprematism" is derived from the word supremus (Russian: Супремус), which translates as "superior" or "perfected", which Malevich said reflected his desire to "liberate" painting from mimesis (imitation) and representational art.

Today Suprematism is primarily associated only with Malevich and his apprentice El Lissitzky.

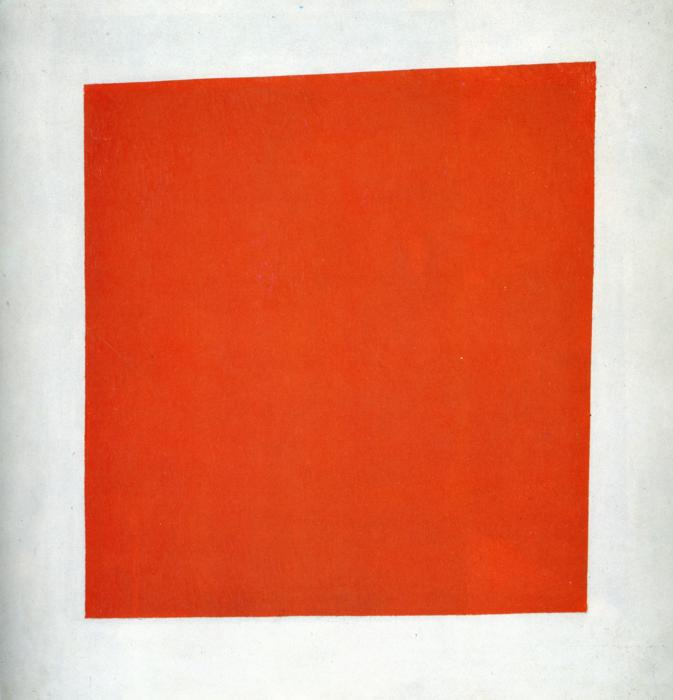
Red Square, 1915. Russian Museum, Saint Petersburg

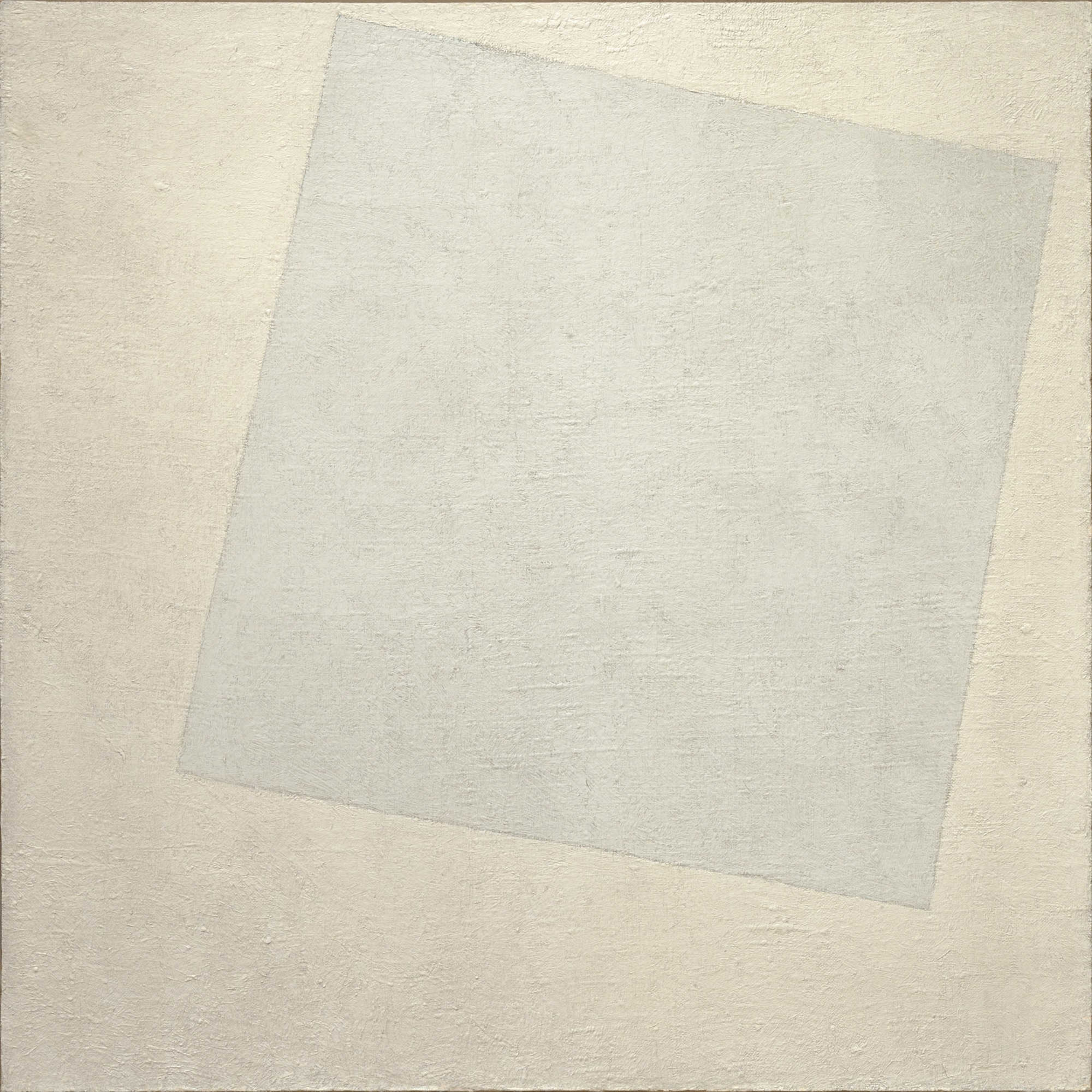
White Square (also known as White on White), 1918. Museum of Modern Art, New York City

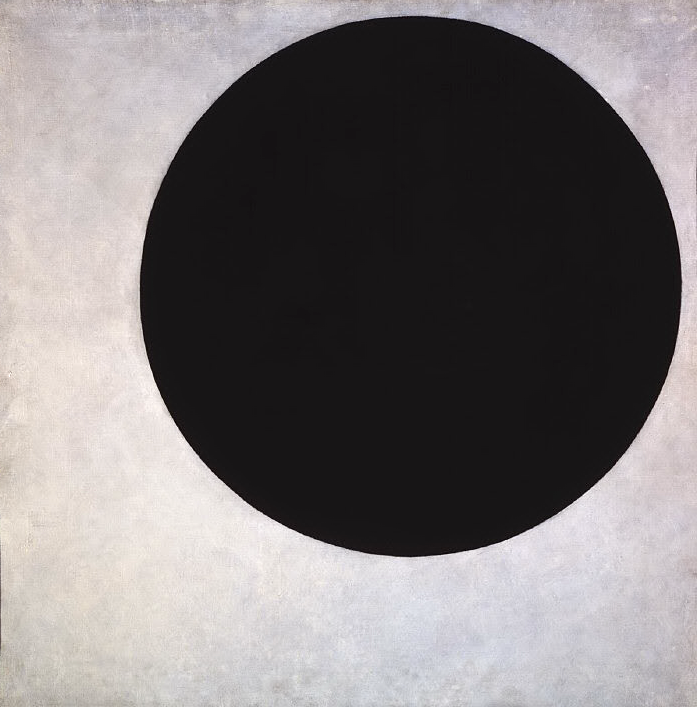
Black Circle, c. 1924. State Russian Museum, St. Petersburg

=== Versions ===
Malevich produced three oil-on-canvas copies of the original painting. The first copy was completed in 1923. The second copy was painted around 1923 in collaboration with his students Anna Leporskaya, Konstantin Rozhdestvensky and Nikolay Suyetin. The third Black Square (also at the Tretyakov Gallery) was painted c. 1929 for Malevich's solo exhibition, perhaps as a stand-in for the original, which was by then in poor condition.

The final Black Square is the smallest and may have been intended as a diptych along with the smaller again Red Square for the 1932 exhibition Artists of the RSFSR: 15 Years in Leningrad, where the two squares formed the centrepiece of the show.

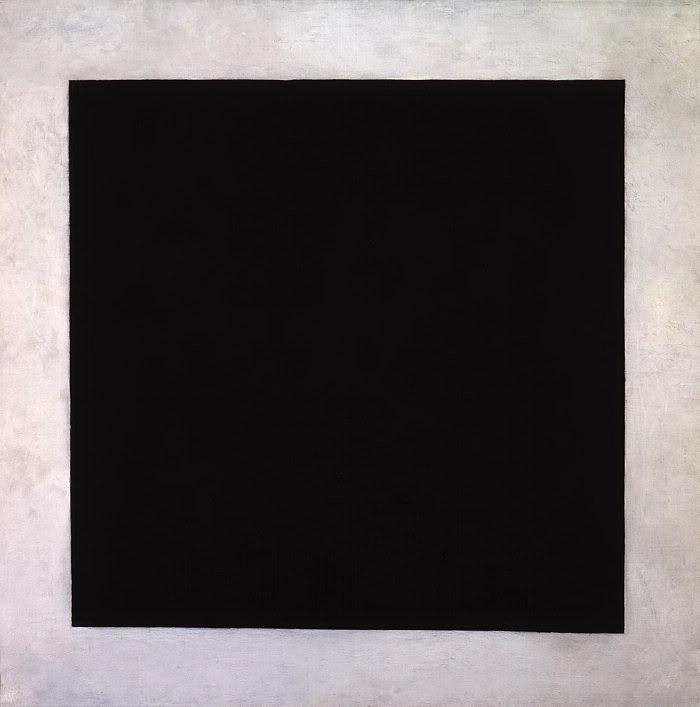
Black Square, c. 1923, Russian Museum

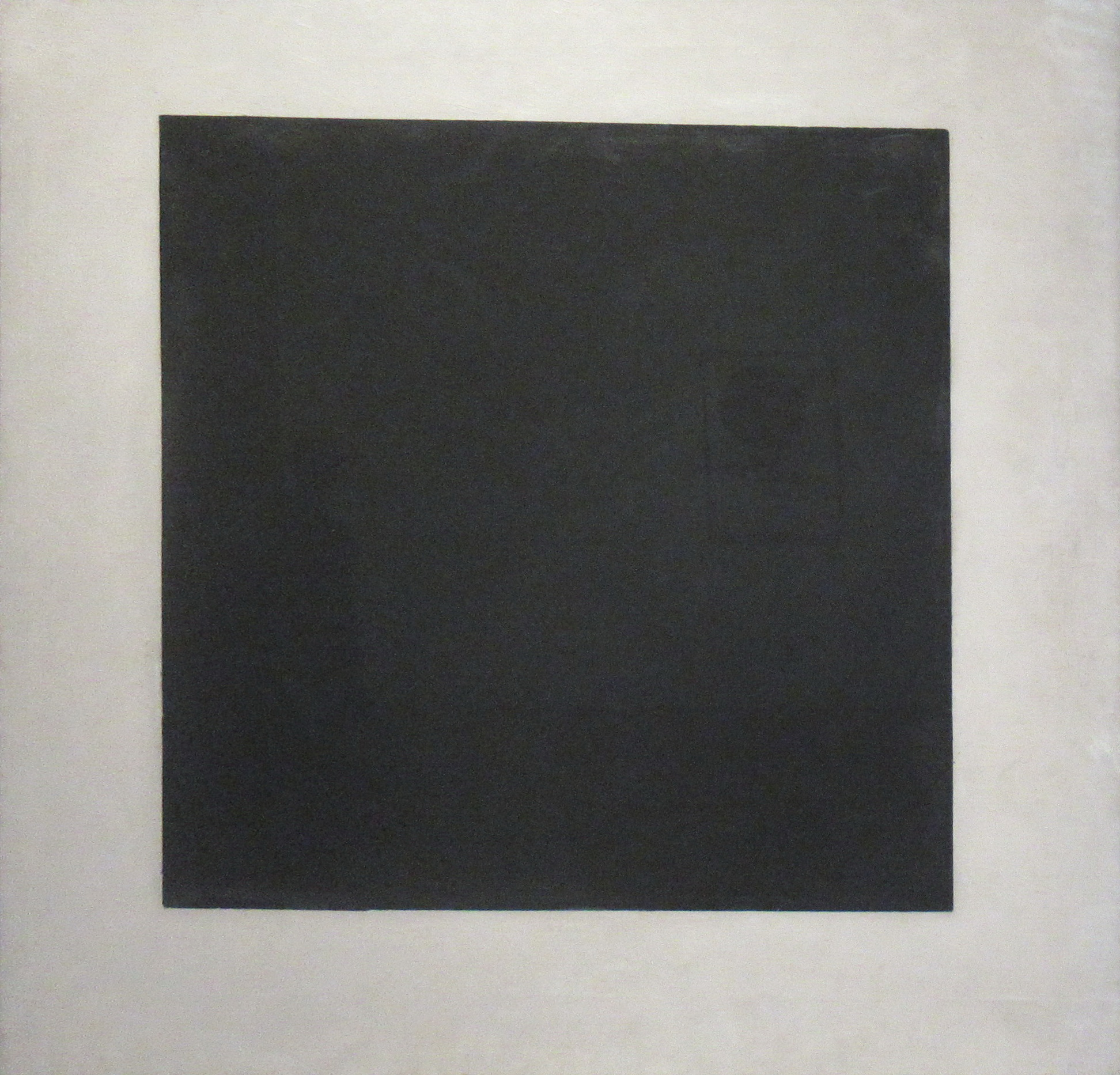
Black Square, 1929, Tretyakov Gallery, Moscow

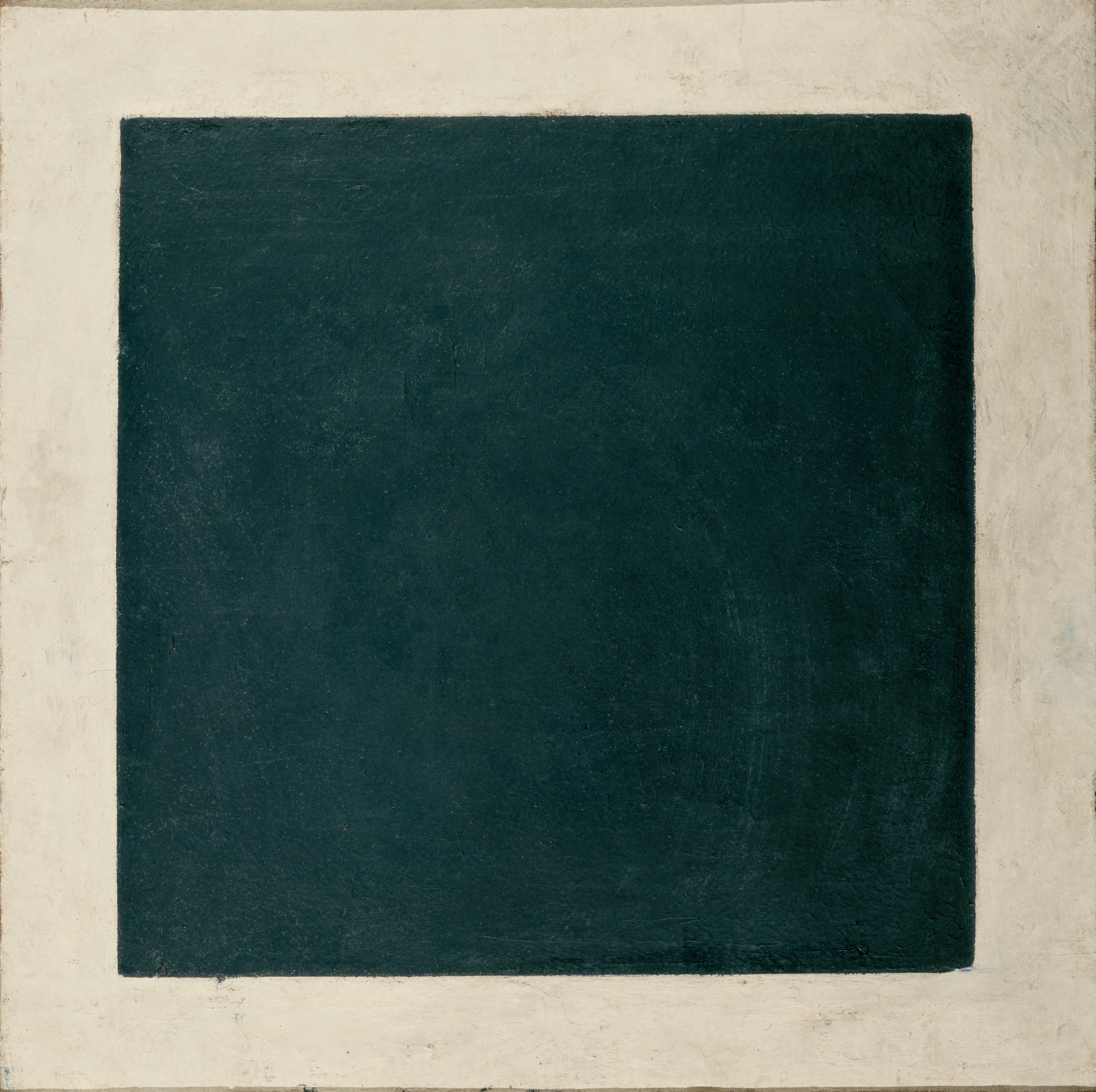
Black Square, c. late 1920s–1930s, Tretyakov Gallery

== Censorship ==
Russian avant-garde art fell from favour during Joseph Stalin's leadership of the USSR. Stalin was suspicious of people who travelled outside the Soviet Union, and Malevich came to the attention of Stalin's secret police in early 1927 as a possible dissident when he travelled to Berlin to attend the Große Deutsche Kunstausstellung exhibition, where around 70 of his paintings and drawings were scheduled for display. Malevich was aware that progressive artists were likely to be suppressed in the Soviet Union and made attempts to relocate to Germany. However, the Nazi party was already targeting so-called "degenerate art" in Germany, that is art that did not conform to the idealised Aryan way of living, which was based around, according to the historian Tony Wood a dedication to "family, home and church", and was "ironically...a mirror image of the socialist realism of the hated Communists."

Malevich was arrested for several days in 1930. His work was officially banned in the USSR shortly after his death in 1935, when Stalin's favoured socialist realism was designated the official art of the union and many other art forms were suppressed.

Although Black Square wasn't exhibited again until the 1980s, today the work is regarded as historically significant in Modern art, and one of the most recognisable 20th century paintings.

== Condition ==
The painting is in poor condition, partly because, under Stalin, it was hidden and neglected in the Soviet archives. According to the American art critic Peter Schjeldahl, "the painting looks terrible: crackled, scuffed, and discoloured, as if it had spent the past eighty-eight years patching a broken window".

== Sources ==
- Blanshard, Frances Bradshaw. "Retreat from Likeness in the Theory of Painting". New York: Columbia University Press, 1949
- Drutt, Matthew. Malevich, Black Square, 1915. New York: Guggenheim, 2003. ISBN 978-0-89207-265-1
- Jakovljevic, Branislav. "Unframe Malevich!: Ineffability and Sublimity in Suprematism". Art Journal, volume 63, no. 3, Autumn 2004. JSTOR 4134488
- Kovtun, E. F.; Douglas, Charlotte. "Kazimir Malevich". Art Journal, volume 41, no. 3, Autumn, 1981. JSTOR 776564
- Naldi, Johann. Arts incohérents, discoveries and new perspectives. Paris: Lienart, April 2022. ISBN 978-2-3590-6366-0
- Meinhardt, Johannes. The Painting As Empty Space: Allan McCollum's Subversion of the Last Painting Archived 11 June 2015 at the Wayback Machine. AURA, Vienna: Wiener Secession, 1994.
- Pinkham, Sophie. Black Square: Adventures in Post-Soviet Ukraine. Cornerstone Digital, 2016. ISBN 0-4340-2351-5
- Roald, Tone; Lang, Johannes. Art and Identity: Essays on the Aesthetic of Creation of the Mind. Rodopi, 2013. ISBN 978-9-4012-0904-5
- Shatskikh, Aleksandra. "Black Square: Malevich and the Origin of Suprematism". Yale University Press, 2012
