= Black Circle =

1924 painting by Kazimir Malevich

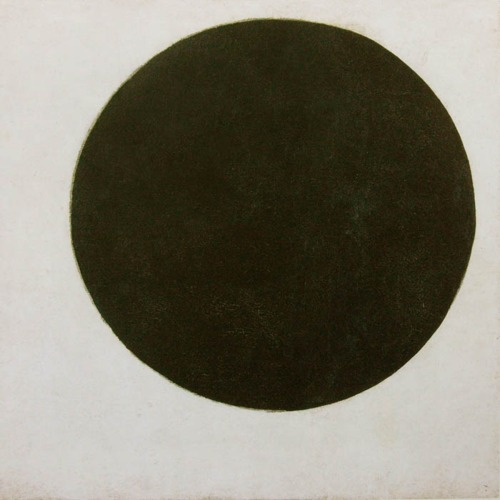
- Artist: Kazimir Malevich
- Year: 1924
- Medium: oil on canvas
- Dimensions: 106 cm × 105.5 cm (42 in × 41.5 in)
- Location: State Russian Museum, St. Petersburg, Russia

Black Circle (or motive 1915) is a 1924 oil-on-canvas painting by the Russian avant-garde artist Kazimir Malevich, founder of the Suprematism movement. From the mid-1910s, Malevich abandoned any trace of figurature or representation from his paintings in favour of pure abstraction.

== Description ==
The work depicts a monumental perfect black circle floating on a flat white background. It is, along with his Black Square of 1915, one of his most well known early works in this field, depicting pure geometrical figures in primary colours. The motif of a black circle was displayed in December 1915 at the '0.10' Exhibition in St. Petersburg along with 34 other of his abstract works. The exhibition coincided with the publication of his manifesto "From Cubism to Suprematism" and launched the radical Suprematism movement.

Malevich described the painting, along with the similar Black Square and Black Cross (both 1915), in spiritual terms; "new icons" for the aesthetics of modern art, and believed that their clarity and simplicity reflected traditional Russian piety. In these notions, his art and ideas later chimed with those of the Bolsheviks. However, while the paintings found favour with intellectuals, they did not appeal to the general viewer and as a result Malevich lost official approval. He was later persecuted by Stalin, who had an implicit mistrust of all modern art.

== Interpretation ==
In his manifesto, Malevich said the works was intended as "desperate struggle to free art from the ballast of the objective world" by focusing only on pure form. He sought to paint works that could be understood by all, but at the same time would have an emotional impact comparable to religious works. In 1990, art critic Michael Brenson noted of the works, "The one constant in Malevich's Suprematism is the white ground. It is utterly selfless and anonymous yet distinct. It is a dense emptiness, or full void. It is atmospheric yet it has little air, and it does not suggest sky. It does not envelop or squeeze the rectangles, rings and lines. It is ready and available but not transparent. It is not open or closed but both at the same time. Some white shapes nestle inside it. Most shapes stick to it. Nothing is trapped. Everything seems held yet free. Shape and whiteness are different but they never struggle."

In 1924, the work along with the Square and Cross, hung at the 14th Venice Biennale. Malevich's work of this period went on to have a significant influence on 20th-century art, most especially on photography of the 1920s and 30s and on the op art movement of the 1960s.

When Malevich died in 1934, he was buried in a coffin decorated by Nikolai Suetin with a black square at the head and a black circle at the foot.

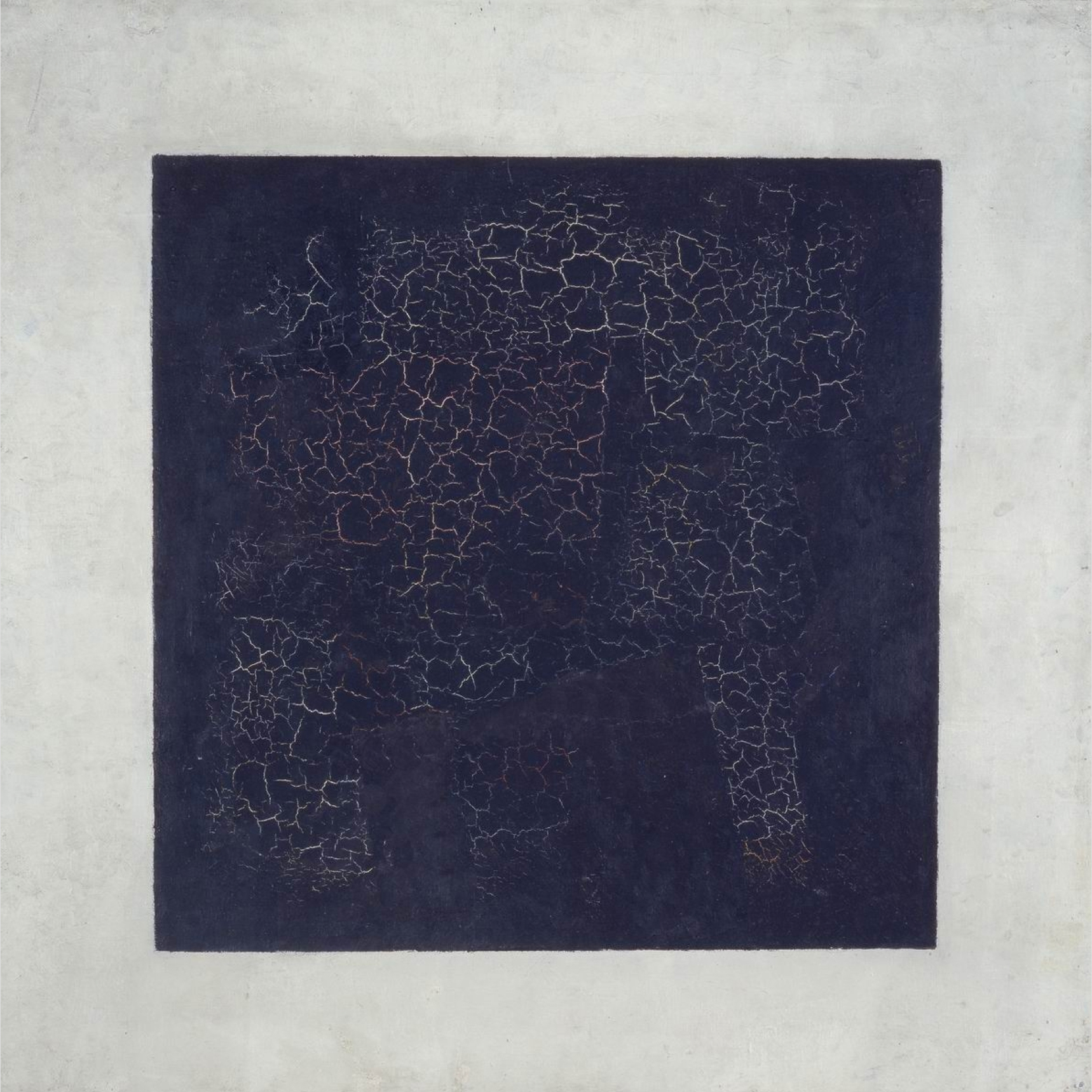
Black Square, ca. 1923, Oil on linen, State Russian Museum

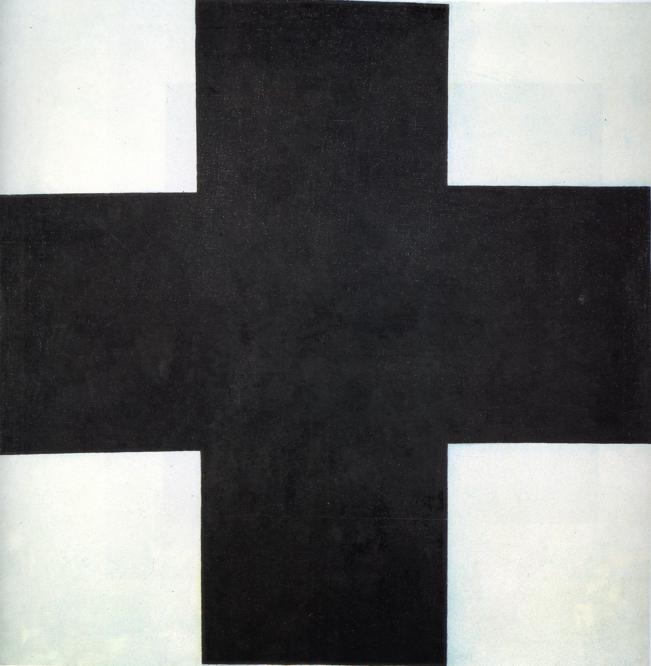
Black Cross, c 1920-23, Oil on Canvas, State Russian Museum

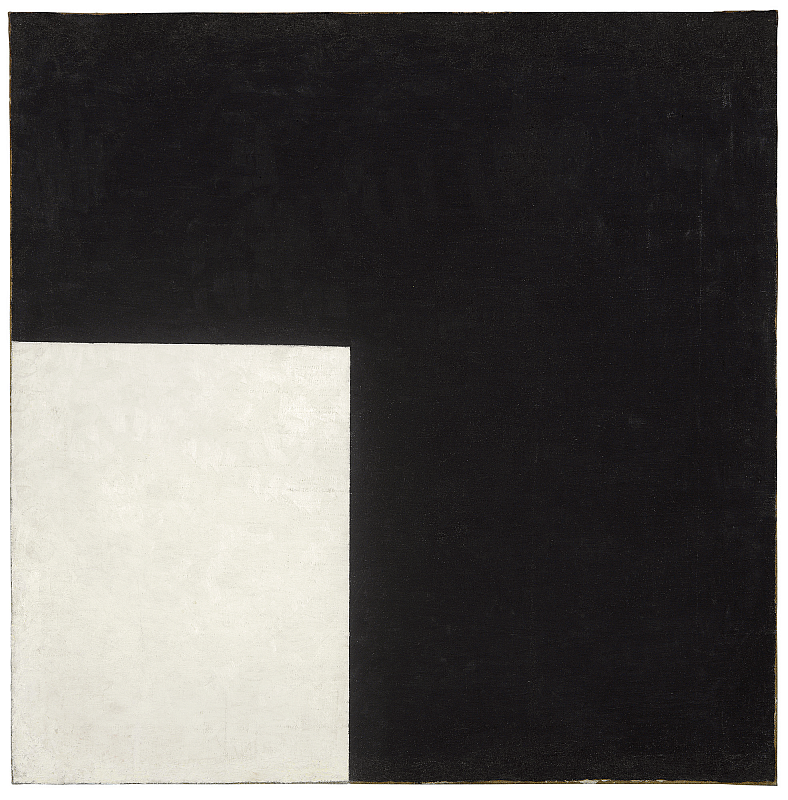
Black and White (Suprematist Composition), 1915, Oil on Canvas, Moderna Museet

== Sources ==
- Gray, Camilla. The Great Experiment: Russian Art, 1863-1922. New York: Harry N. Abrams, 1962
- Farthing, Stephen. 1001 Paintings You Must See Before You Die. Cassel Illustrated, 2011. ISBN 978-1-84403-704-9
- Branislav, Jakovljevic. "Unframe Malevich!: Ineffability and Sublimity in Suprematism". Art Journal (CAA), volume 63, no. 3, 2004. JSTOR 4134488
- Néret, Gilles. Kazimir Malevich 1878-1935 and Suprematism. Taschen, 2003. ISBN 0-87414-119-2
