= White on White =

1918 painting by Kazimir Malevich

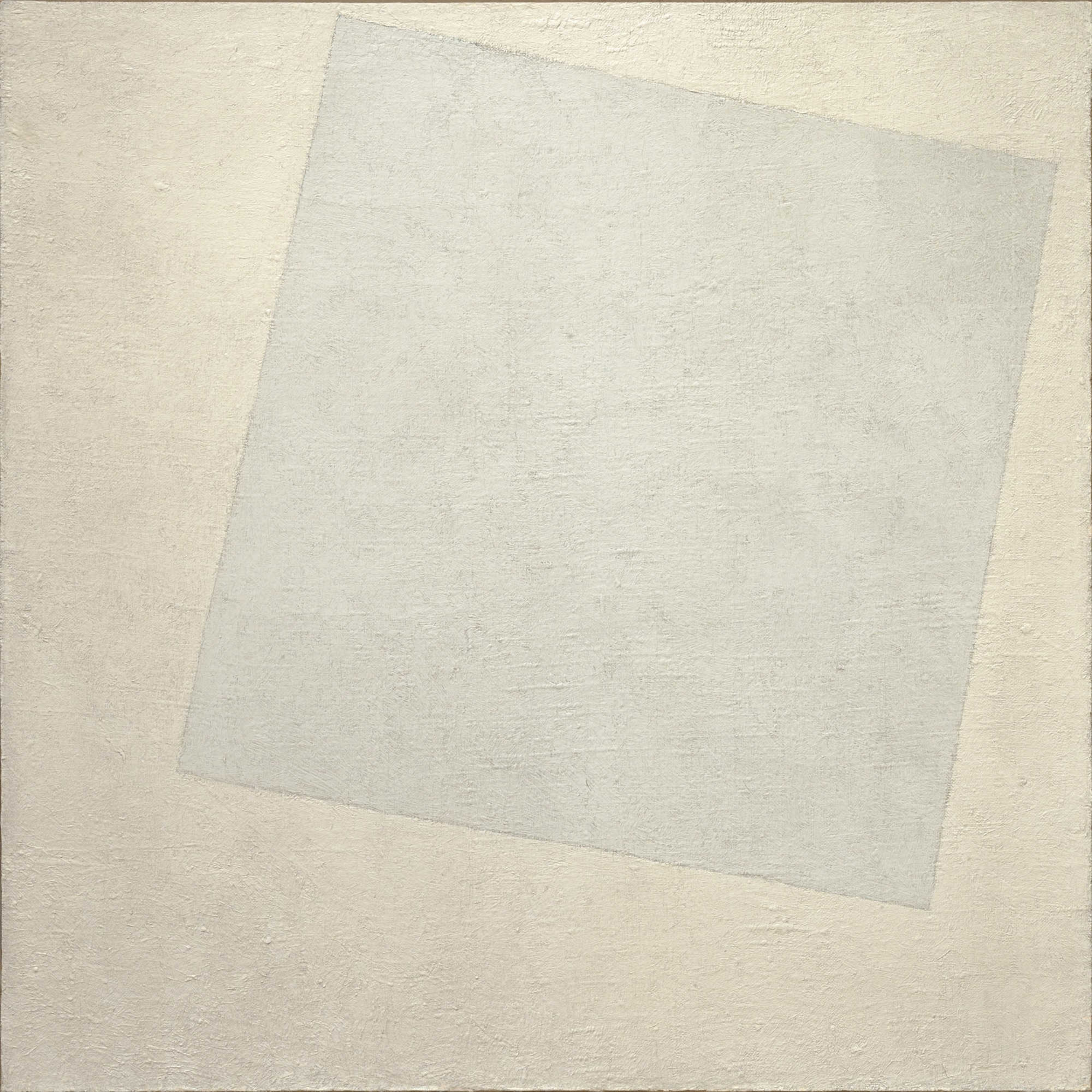
- Artist: Kazimir Malevich
- Year: 1918
- Catalogue: 80385
- Medium: Oil on canvas
- Dimensions: 79.4 cm × 79.4 cm (31¼ in × 31¼ in)
- Location: Museum of Modern Art, New York
- Accession: 817.1935

Suprematist Composition: White on White (1918) is an abstract oil-on-canvas painting by Kazimir Malevich. It is one of the more well-known examples of the Russian Suprematism movement, painted the year after the October Revolution. The white square is one of the Malevich's three suprematist squares, the other two being black and red.

== Description ==
Part of a series of "white on white" works begun by Malevich in 1916, the work depicts a white square, portrayed off-centre and at an angle on a ground which is also a white square of a slightly warmer tone. The work measures 79.5 by 79.5 centimetres (31.3 in × 31.3 in). Malevich dispenses with most of the characteristics of representational art, with no sense of colour, depth, or volume, leaving a simple monochrome geometrical shape, not precisely symmetrical, with imprecisely defined boundaries. Although the artwork is stripped of most detail, brush strokes are evident in this painting and the artist tried to make it look as if the tilted square is coming out of the canvas. Malevich intended the painting to evoke a feeling of floating, with the colour white symbolising infinity, and the slight tilt of the square suggesting movement.

== History ==
Malevich took the work to Berlin in 1927, where it was displayed at the Große Berliner Austellung. When he returned to Leningrad later that year, Malevich left it with the architect Hugo Häring; in 1930 he passed it on to Alexander Dorner, director of the Provinzialmuseum in Hanover, who put it into storage after the Nazi party came to power in 1933. Malevich did not ask for the work to be returned, and died in 1935 without leaving instructions on the inheritance of his estate. It was put on display at the Museum of Modern Art in New York in 1935, and added to the Museum's collection in 1963, and the acquisition was confirmed by the estate of Kazimir Malevich in 1999, using funds from the bequest of Mrs. John Hay Whitney.

== Reception ==
A critic from the rival Constructivist movement quipped that it was the only good canvas in an exhibition by Malevich's UNOVIS group: "an absolutely pure, white canvas with a very good prime coating. Something could be done on it."

== See also ==
- Black Square (1915)
