= Black Cross (painting) =

1915 painting by Kazimir Malevich

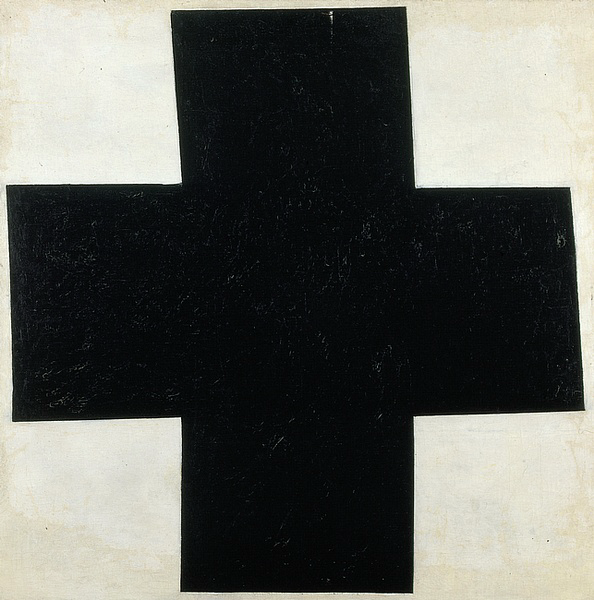
- Artist: Kazimir Malevich
- Year: 1915–1924
- Medium: Oil on linen
- Dimensions: 79 cm × 79 cm (31 in × 31 in)
- Location: Musée National d'Art Moderne; Paris

Black Cross (also known as The Black Cross) is an iconic oil painting by Kazimir Malevich. The first version was done in 1915. From the mid-1910s, Malevich abandoned any trace of figurature or representation from his paintings in favour of pure abstraction.

== Description ==
Malevich chose a square format for this painting. Against a white parchment background, a black cross occupies the entire canvas. It is a Greek cross, one of the most common forms of Christian crosses, in use since the 4th century. These crosses are characterized by the fact that all the arms are of equal length. In the case of this painting, the arms are oriented horizontally and vertically.

== History ==
Black Cross was first shown in The Last Futurist Exhibition 0,10 in 1915. It was part of Malevich’s triptych formed by Black Square, Black Cross, and Black Circle.

== Bibliography ==
- Gray, Camilla. The Great Experiment: Russian Art, 1863–1922. New York: Harry N. Abrams, 1962
- Farthing, Stephen. 1001 Paintings You Must See Before You Die. Cassel Illustrated, 2011. ISBN 978-1-84403-704-9
- Néret, Gilles. Kazimir Malevich 1878–1935 and Suprematism. Taschen, 2003. ISBN 0-87414-119-2
