= Portrait of Pablo Picasso =

1915 painting by Amedeo Modigliani

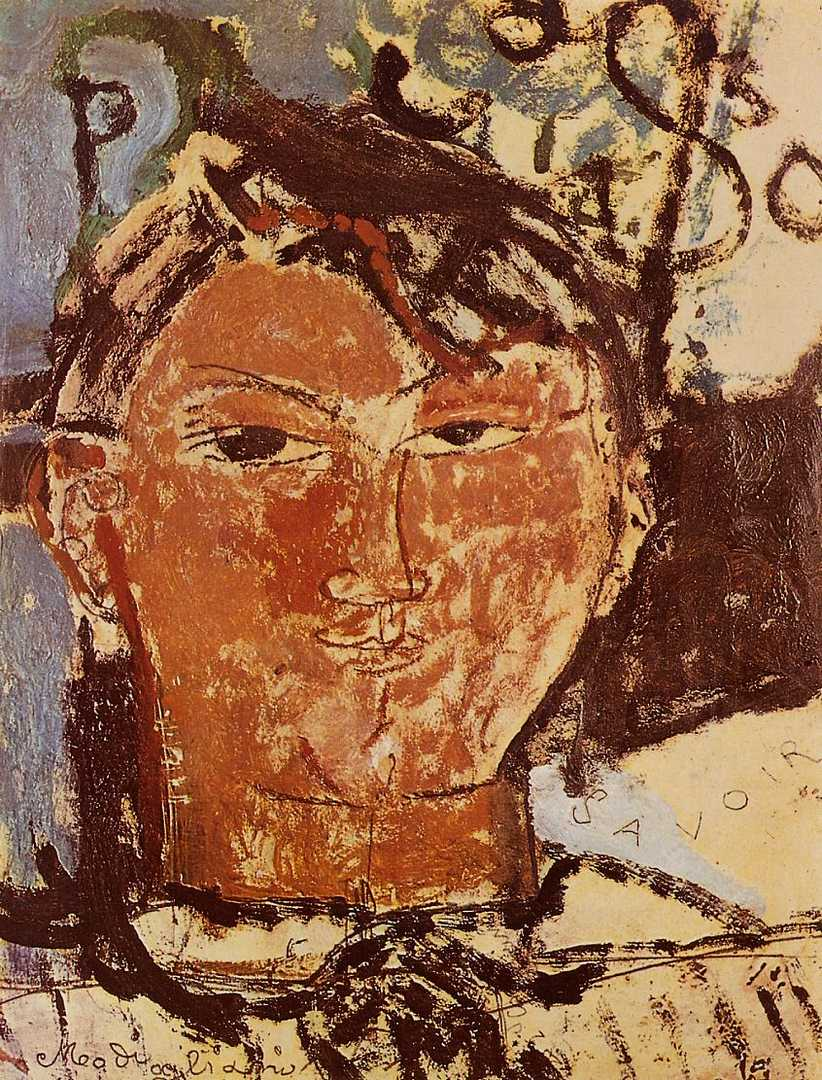
- Artist: Amedeo Modigliani
- Year: 1915
- Medium: oil on paper mounted on card
- Owner: Private collection

Portrait of Pablo Picasso is an oil on paper mounted on card painting by Italian artist Amedeo Modigliani created in 1915.

== Description ==
The portrait depicts the duality in the relations of Modigliani and Picasso who shared both an artistic rivalry and a mutual admiration. The uneven two-toned face of the subject suggests an inner conflict within the artist, as well as between artist and subject.

Modigliani and Picasso first met in Paris in 1906 when Modigliani lived in Le Bateau-Lavoir artistic community where Picasso had a studio and worked on such works as Les Demoselles d’Avignon. Even though Picasso is said to admire Modigliani's art, needing a canvas he once painted over a Modigliani's work he had acquired.

== Provenance ==
In the 1930s, the Portrait of Pablo Picasso by Modigliani was owned by Pablo Picasso, as well as some other Modigliani's work, including Girl with Brown Hair, dating from 1918. Currently the Portrait of Pablo Picasso is in a private collection.
