= Portrait of the Painter Moisè Kisling =

Painting by Amedeo Modigliani

Portrait de Moïse Kisling
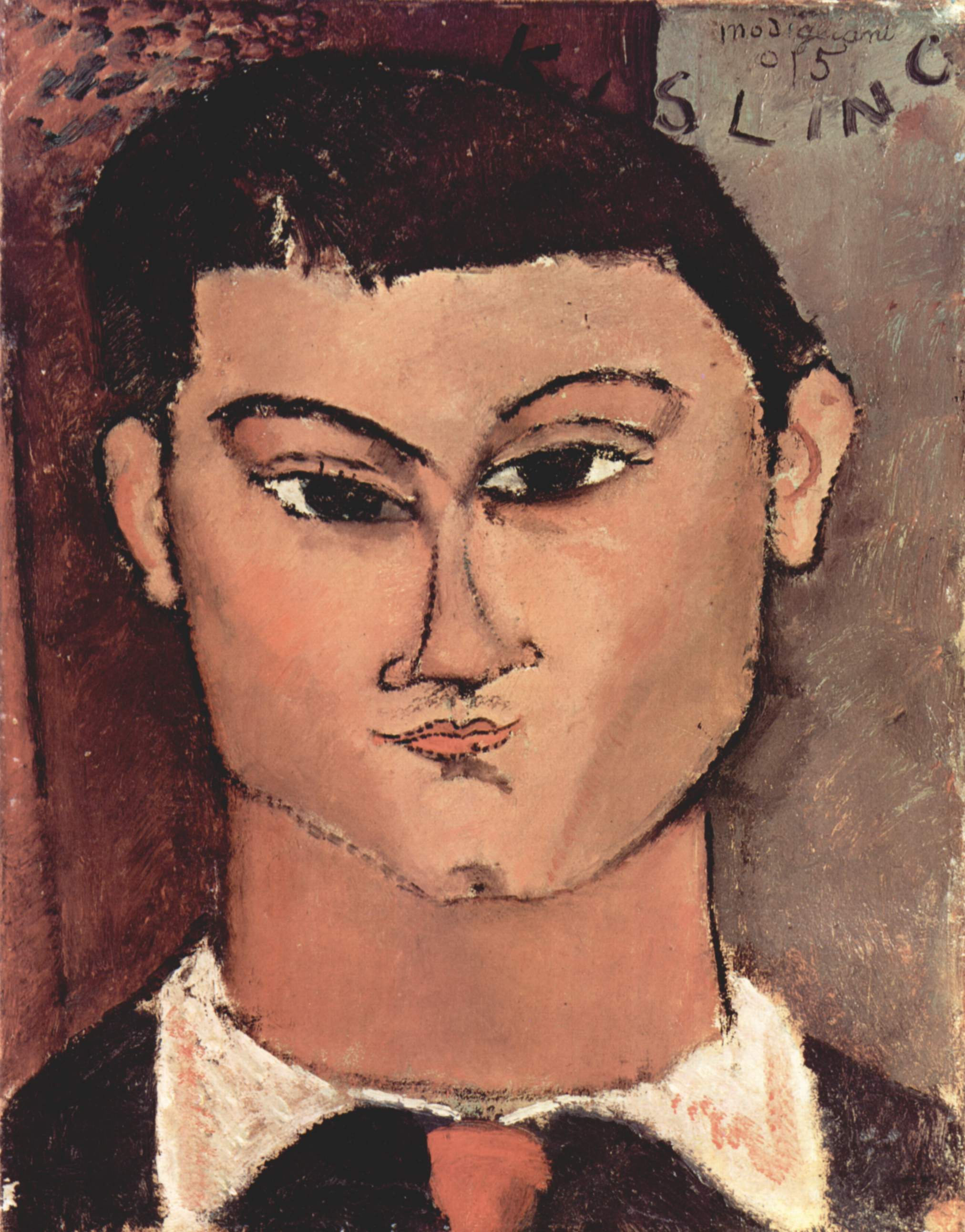
- Artist: Amedeo Modigliani
- Year: 1915
- Type: Oil paint on canvas
- Dimensions: 37 by 29 centimetres (15 in × 11 in)
- Location: Pinacoteca di Brera; Milan

Portrait of the Painter Moisè Kisling is 1915 oil painting by Italian painter Amedeo Modigliani, a portrait of Modigliani's friend, the Polish Jew painter Moïse Kisling. The painting is the collection of Pinacoteca di Brera in Milan, Italy

== History and description ==
This portrait of Kisling was probably made in 1915, after his return to Paris, having been discharged from the French Foreign Legion following war wounds. The painting shows clearly the influence of cubism.
