= Bursting Shell =

Painting by C.R.W. Nevinson

- Artist: C.R.W. Nevinson
- Year: 1915
- Type: Oil on canvas, war art
- Dimensions: 76 cm × 56 cm (30 in × 22 in)
- Location: Tate Britain, London

Bursting Shell is a 1915 oil painting by the British artist C.R.W. Nevinson. It shows an exploding artillery shell, shattering nearby roads and buildings with its impact. The artist had served as a volunteer ambulance diver on the Western Front during the opening months of the First World War. Nevinson had been a key figure in the Futurist movement before the outbreak of war and continued to paint in a distinctly Modernist style during the conflict.

In November 1915 it featured at the third exhibition held by the The London Group at the Goupil Gallery. A review in the The Observer noted "Bursting Shells is Futurism pure and simple, without a remnant of realistic tendencies". In 1916 it may also have been displayed at Nevinson's solo exhibition at the Leicester Galleries in London, although it is difficult to distinguish it from another painting he produced with an identical title. The painting is now in the Tate Britain in Pimlico, having been acquired by the gallery in 1983.

== Bibliography ==
- Curtis, Penelope. Dynamism: The Art of Modern Life Before the Great War. Tate Gallery Liverpool, 1991.
- Ingleby, Richard. C.R.W. Nevinson: The Twentieth Century. Merrell Holberton, 1999.
- Walsh, Michael J.K. Hanging a Rebel: The Life of C.R.W. Nevinson. Lutterworth, 2008.
