= Anna Leporskaya =

Russian Imperial and Soviet painter

- Born: Anna Aleksandrovna Leporskaya; February 1, 1900; Chernihiv, Russian Empire
- Died: March 14, 1982 (aged 82); Leningrad, Russian SFSR

Anna Aleksandrovna Leporskaya (Russian: А́нна Алекса́ндровна Лепо́рская; January 20 [O.S. February 1] 1900 – March 14, 1982) was a Soviet avant-garde artist. She was a recipient of several awards, including Honored Artist of the RSFSR and the Repin State Prize.

Leporskaya was a longtime student and assistant of Kazimir Malevich. She was closely associated with Malevich from 1924 until his death in 1935, and was responsible for creating the authoritative register of Malevich's works. Many of her works are on display at the Tretyakov Gallery, having previously been part of the private collection of George Costakis.

On or about December 8, 2021, the painting Three Figures by Leporskaya was damaged while on loan from the Tretyakov Gallery to the Yeltsin Center. An individual added eyes to the painting's faceless figures with a ballpoint pen; owing to the negligible damage done to the painting, local police initially declined to open a criminal case. Yeltsin Center staff confirmed on February 8 that the vandal had been identified as a member of site security who had gotten bored on his first day of work. A police investigation was ongoing as of February 10, 2022. If found guilty, the security guard could face a fine and up to three months in prison. A day after the vandalism was discovered, the painting was returned to Moscow's State Tretyakov Gallery for restoration.
