= Frances Gabe =

American inventor

- Born: June 23, 1915; Idaho, US
- Died: December 26, 2016 (age 101); Oregon, US
- Occupations: Inventor, artist
- Notable work: Self-Cleaning House

Frances Gabe was an American inventor who is most well known for devising household gadgets for convenience but more specifically for designing and building the first "self-cleaning house".

Frances, the daughter of Frederick Arnholz and the former Ernestine Ganske was born on a ranch near Boise, Idaho. Her father was an architect and construction worker which prompted the family to constantly move around. Growing up, Frances constantly moved around; she attended a total of 18 different elementary schools.

Gabe's interest in innovation and construction stemmed from her time accompanying her father at work. She found a sense of continuity among the builders she met when she accompanied her father on jobs and as she observed she learned much of their craft. She truly worshiped him, spending as much time as she could riding up scaffolding on his shoulders.

Frances graduated from Girls Polytechnic High School in Portland at 16 and at the age of 17, she married Herbert Grant Bateson. The couple operated a small construction company business in Portland, Oregon for a couple of years and then moved to Newberg, Oregon. In 1967, Frances Gabe divorced Herbert Bateson. Although the couple divorced, Bateson lived on the property on a trailer outside the main house.

After the divorce, Frances began to feel quite lonely and this was the turning point for the invention that allowed her to gain fame. She particularly hated housework and thought it inconvenient and time-consuming. With this, she saw no reason to spend the rest of her life spending her time cleaning and so she got to work. The idea for the infamous self-cleaning house was born from a simple dilemma. Frances Gabe's young children were constantly the cause of the fig-jam ending up smeared on the walls. Exasperated by this, Gabe took a hose and washed the jam away, this was the foundation for the self-cleaning house.

Over a 12-year period, she actually built it. Throughout this process, Frances received criticism from local communities; she once had a group of angry housewives at the doorstep claiming that her invention would take away their jobs and their husband's need for them. The house incorporated 70 of her separate inventions, from a self-cleaning dishwasher, a self-cleaning fireplace, and even giving her dog a bath. Each room contained a cleaning apparatus that was roughly 10 square inches in the center of the room. The self-cleaning system works by opening a valve and then pushing a button. This activates a sprinkler system that dispenses soap and water across the room. This automated car wash-like system cleans ceilings, walls, floors, windows, curtains, and furniture. Gabe obtained 36 patents for various pieces of cleaning inventions she invented, including a material used to cover upholstery which is strong enough to hold molten steel but soft enough to sleep on comfortably. In 1980 she applied for a patent and finally received it on January 31, 1984, for Self-Cleaning Construction.

In 2002, Frances began charging visitors by appointment with a rate of $25 for the first visitor and $5 for each additional person. Frances received the recognition she deserved in 2003 when an intricate model of the house was displayed in the new Women's Museum in Dallas.

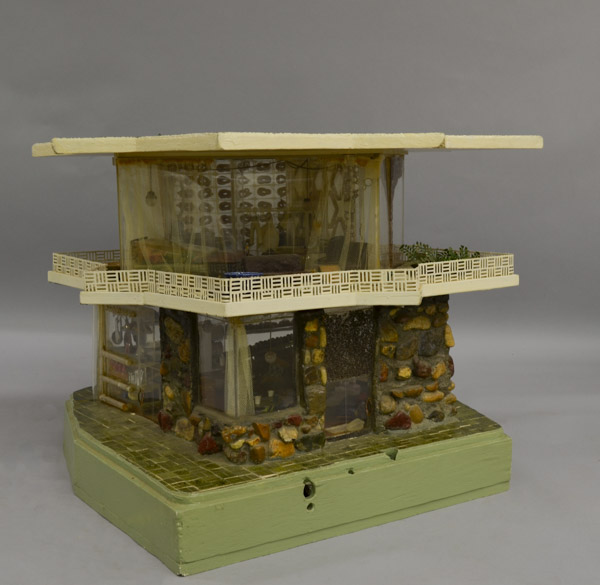
Patent Model-Self-Cleaning House, Jan. 31, 1984, Patent No. 4,428,085, Hagley Museum and Library

== Early life ==
Gabe was born in 1915 on a ranch near Boise, Idaho. Her mother Erenstine, died when Gabe was very young and she did not get along with her step-mother. Gabe spent most of her childhood with her father Frederick, as he worked as a building contractor and architect on construction sites. Gabe attended eighteen different elementary schools as her family travelled around the Pacific Northwest for work. In 1929, she graduated from the Girl's Polytechnic School in Portland, Oregon at the age of sixteen having completed six years of middle school and high school in two years. She had a difficult time in school and told Chuck Palahnuik, when interviewed for his book about unique characters in Portland Oregon, "I was born a most unusual person, so I had a heck of a time in school. Everything moved much too slowly," Gabe continued. "My last day, I stood up in class and screamed at my teacher, 'You told us that last week!'"

== Personal life ==
Gabe married Herbert Bateson, an electrical engineer in 1932 and they had two children. They ran a construction and maintenance company together for many years. The couple eventually divorced in the 1970s. After the divorce Gabe changed her last name which was a combination of her maiden and married names: Grace, Arnholtz, Bateson and E.

== Inventions ==
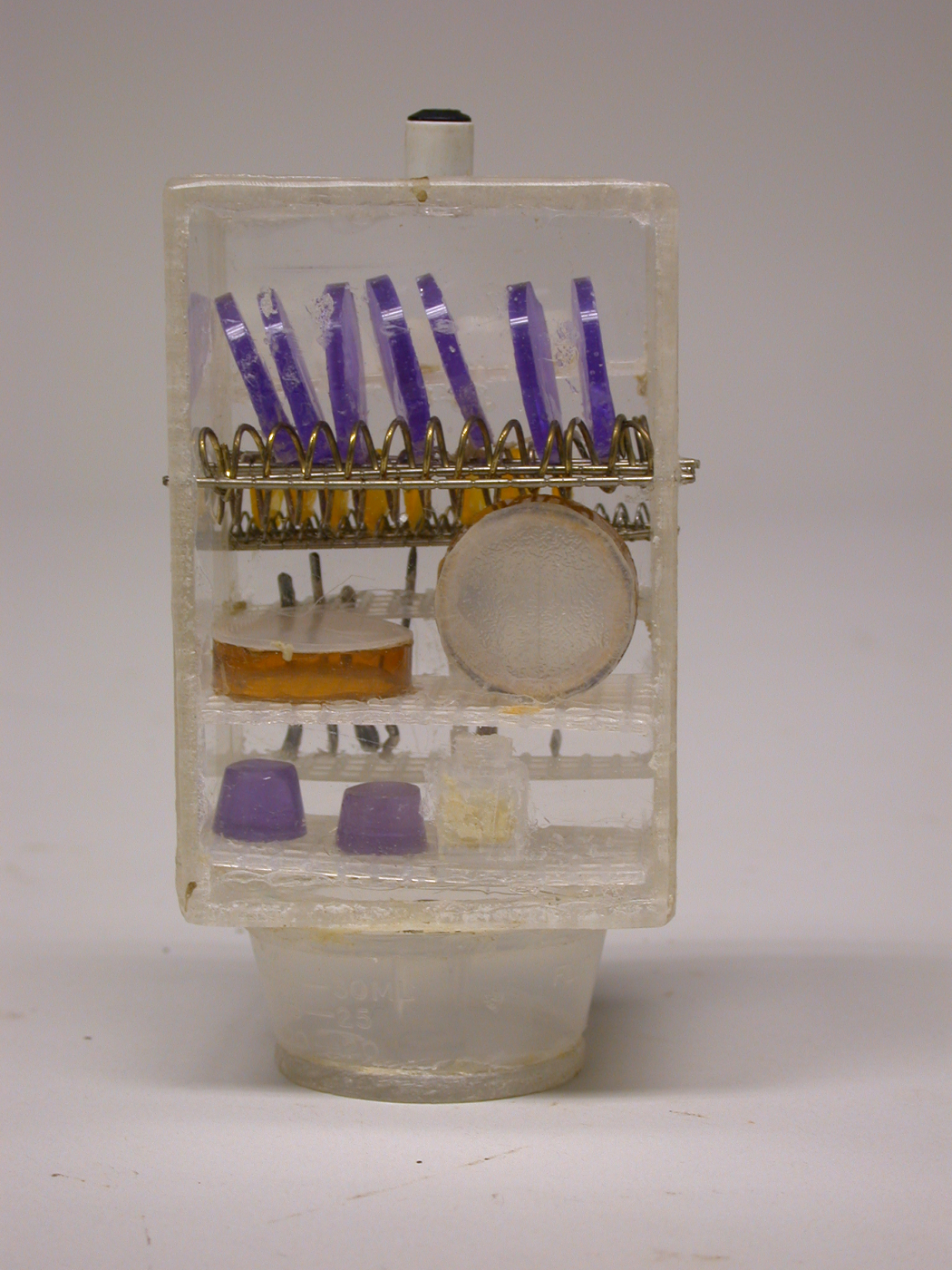
Self Cleaning Dishwasher Cabinet Model, Circa 1980, Hagley Museum and Library

Gabe's invention was borne out of frustration. "Why waste time loading a dishwasher, then unloading it and putting them in the cupboard? Why can't dishes be washed in the cupboard and save time?" Gabe wanted to do away with the thankless job of housecleaning. With her own money and construction skills, Gabe built a house on her property in Newberg which was full of devices that washed and dried the interior of the house. This led to her applying in 1980 and finally receiving patent number 4,428,085 on January 31, 1984, for Self-Cleaning Building Construction. Her patent application stated "A self-cleaning building construction comprises apparatus for applying a fine spray or mist of water and/or water and detergent to wall, floor and ceiling surfaces, followed by warm air drying. Floors slope in a direction for removing excess moisture via a drain. Also included are closet apparatus for cleaning clothing, cupboard dishwasher apparatus for cleaning stored dishes, self-cleaning bathtub apparatus, and self-cleaning washbasin apparatus."

Gabe built a two-story model of the patented house and toured the country doing interviews and lectures in the hopes of inspiring interest and selling her patent rights. Unfortunately she was never able to find a buyer and her home remained the only one of its kind. Over the years she offered tours of her home to visitors for a modest fee but it was not enough to maintain her patent or the upkeep of her house.

== Death and legacy ==
Gabe outlived her husband and her children. She died at the age of 101 at the end of 2016 in a nursing home in obscurity. It was not until July 2017 that the New York Times ran an obituary about Gabe that sparked people's interest in her again. Other publications picked up on this and ran their own articles on her including the Smithsonian Magazine and MIT. Gabe's house was sold when her family had to put her in a nursing home. The house still stands but most of the self-cleaning features have been removed by the current owner.

Artist Lily Benson visited Gabe at her home in 2005 and that visit inspired a short film by Benson based on Gabe's invention which was released in 2015.

== Collections ==
- Self-Cleaning House Model, January 31, 1984, Hagley Museum and Library
