= Red Square (painting) =

Painting by Kazimir Malevich

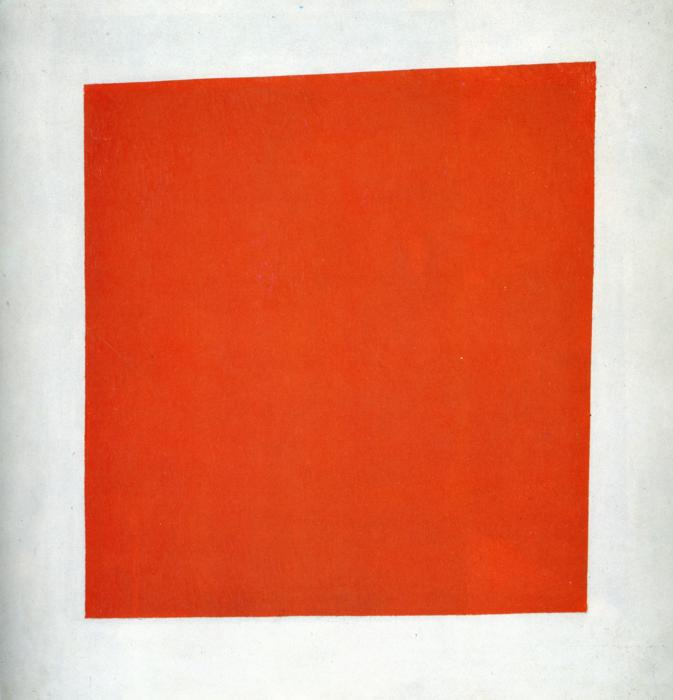
- Artist: Kazimir Malevich
- Year: 1915
- Medium: Oil on canvas
- Dimensions: 53 by 53 centimetres (21 in × 21 in)
- Location: Russian Museum, Saint Petersburg

Painterly Realism of a Peasant Woman in Two Dimensions, also known as Red Square, is a 1915 painting by Kazimir Malevich. Red Square was part of Malevich's Suprematist art movement (1915–1919), which aimed to create artworks that were universally understood.

A non-representational work, the painting shows a red quadrilateral on a white field. The red square is one of the Malevich's three suprematist squares, the other two being black and white.

Red Square is currently in the collection of the Russian Museum.

== Background ==
Malevich first began exploring the artistic potential of the square in stage curtains for the 1913 Russian Futurist/Cubo-Futurist opera Victory Over the Sun. The design reflected the synthesis of Russian and Western European art on the eve of World War I.

The Red Square was displayed at The Last Futurist Exhibition of Paintings 0,10 in Petrograd alongside other notable works by Malevich including Black Square and White on White.

Unlike Black Square and Black Circle, Red Square was not included in First Russian Art Exhibition held in Berlin in 1922 because the painting was considered less important by UNOVIS.

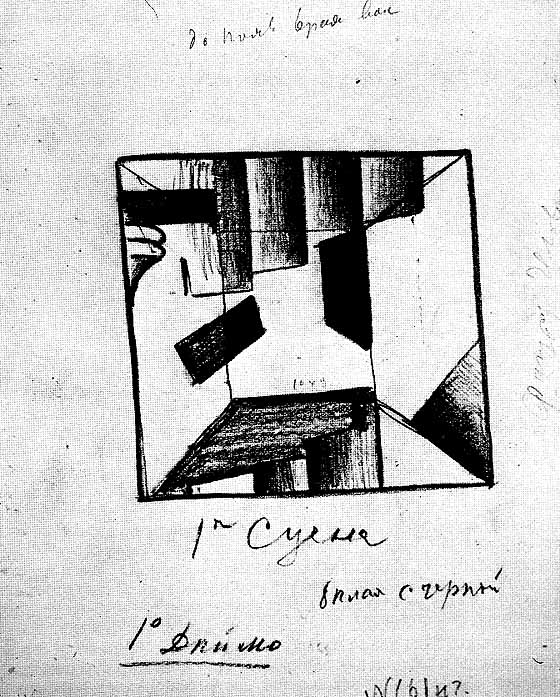
Stage design for Victory over the Sun, Act 1, Scene 1. 1913. Graphite pencil on paper, 25.9 x 20.2 cm.

Like many of Malevich's paintings from the time, Red Square does not have a clear orientation. Even in exhibitions where Malevich helped mount the works, it may have hung in various positions.

== Suprematism ==
Emphasizing pure abstraction and geometric shape, Red Square is an example of Suprematism. Concerned only with form and the purity of shape, particularly that of the square, Malevich primarily considered Suprematism as an exploration of visual language as well as a step in the evolution of religious understanding. The rejection of form was a fundamental premise of Suprematism. For Malevich, Suprematism was purely aesthetic, divorced from political or social meaning.

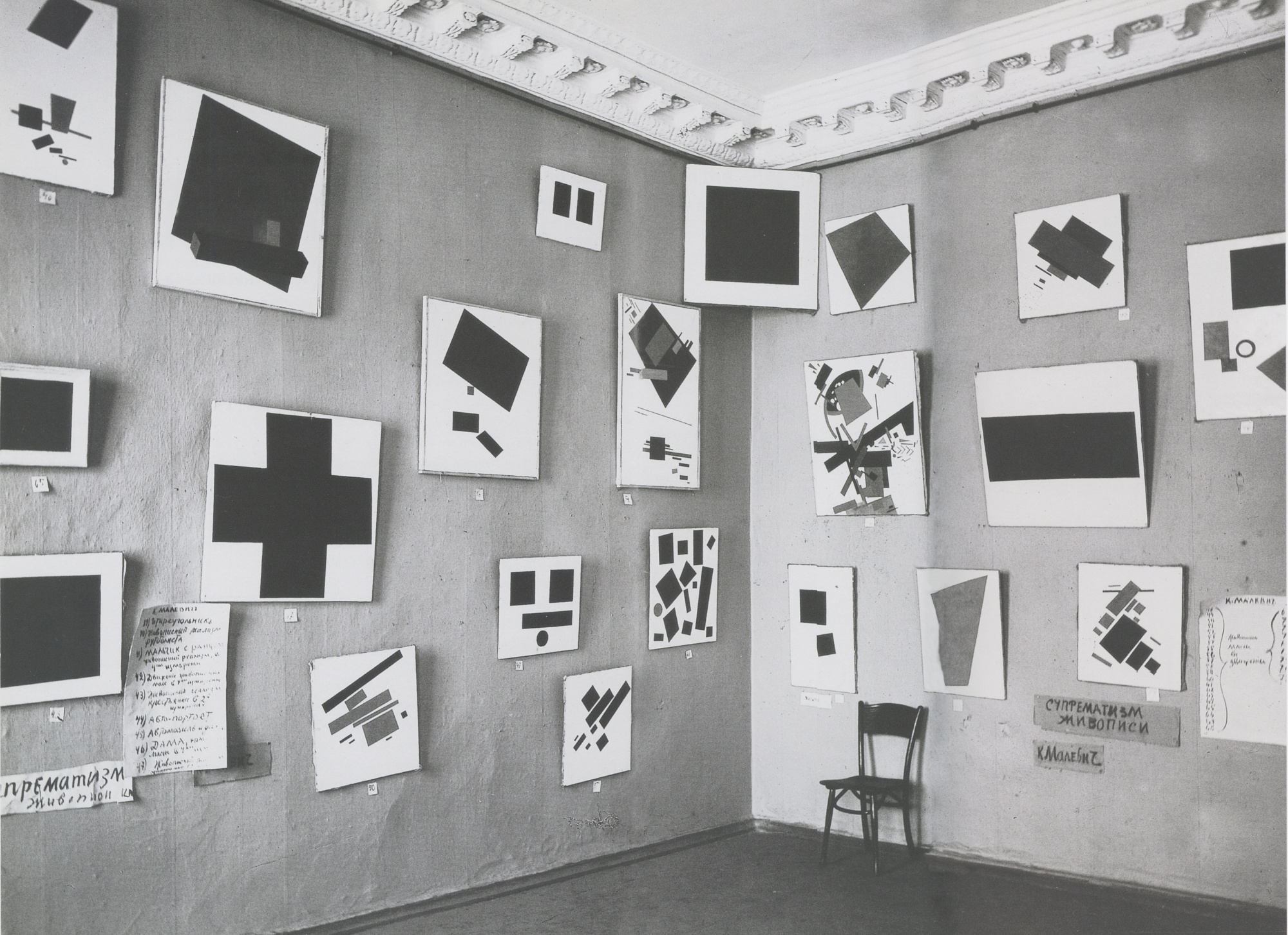
Suprematist works by Malevich at the 0,10 Exhibition in Petrograd.

On the back canvas of Red Square, there is an inscription that reads "Peasant Woman (Suprematism)," making this one of the first times Malevich used the term "Suprematism".

== Restoration ==
Red Square and two other works by Malevich were restored shortly before the artist's death because the paint had begun flaking. The flaking likely occurred due to Malevich repainting a section of Red Square that had previously been painted. His paintings have been continually restored, with the most extensive restorations taking place in 1976 and 1988.

== Description ==
In December 1920, Malevich looked back at the period of Suprematism, concluding that is marked by three evolutionary phases that corresponded with a square: a black, a red, and a white phase. Red Square therefore corresponds with the second evolutionary phase of the Suprematism. Describing his Suprematist works as nonobjective, but never abstract, Malevich intended to liberate painting from the burden of recognizable images.

When creating Red Square Malevich began by drawing a line at the top of the form in the proportion of 2:8:2. He then lowered one corner of the quadrilateral, stretching the shape into a distorted configuration. While the red quadrilateral may appear asymmetrical, it maintains its symmetry along one diagonal axis. This depiction of the quadrilateral demonstrates how Malevich was beginning to manipulate basic forms, with his compositions determined by the cohesion of space. On the canvas the quadrilateral was not intended to be an "image" but rather a "living form" with Malevich describing the square in a letter to Alexander Benous as the "single bare and frameless icon of our time".

Intimate in scale and densely painted, Red Square contains intense brushwork with the flat application of the red pigment creating an ambiguous effect on the surface of the painting. The ruby red pigment used by Malevich gives a depth and glow to the surface of the painting. The appearance of the color is uniform, without shadow or tone, yet the actual application of the color is not meticulous. Malevich's fragmentary use of varnish can be seen with only the form of the red quadrilateral being varnished. However, this is a departure from some of Malevich's other paintings where the white background, rather than the form, would be varnished. Malevich did not attach any symbolic relevance to color as Suprematist practices emphasized that the colors and shapes speak their own language. This is an expression of Malevich's belief that everything is in motion. In this way Malevich asserted that the dynamic of color is timeless.

== Sources ==
- Jakovljevic, Branislav. "Unframe Malevich!: Ineffability and Sublimity in Suprematism". Art Journal, volume 63, no. 3, Autumn 2004. JSTOR 4134488
