= Portrait of Paul Guillaume (De Chirico, Grenoble) =

Painting by Giorgio de Chirico in Grenoble

Portrait of Paul Guillaume is a 1915 oil on canvas painting by Giorgio de Chirico of the art dealer Paul Guillaume, now in the Museum of Grenoble, to which it was given by the artist in 1935, inspired by Guillaume's gift of Les époux to the same museum in 1927.

== Loans ==
- Tentoonstelling van de Afdeeling Moderne Fransche Kunst iut het Museum van Grenoble, Amsterdam, Stedelijk Museum, 12 October 1935 to 14 November 1935.
- Appolinaire, Bibliothèque nationale, Paris, 1969.
- Arte italiano, Desde las primeras vanguardias a la postguerra, Madrid, Centro de Arte Reina Sofia, 1990.
- Apollinaire, ses livres, ses amis, Paris, Bibliothèque historique de la ville de Paris, 1991.
- Giorgo de Chirico, un pittore e l'Europa, Rome, Palazzo delle esposizione, décembre 1992 à février 1993 / Gênes, Palazzo Ducale, mars à mai 1993.
- Les Origines de l'Art Moderne en France 1880 - 1939, Singapore, Singapore Art Museum, 1998.
- L'autre visage de la modernité, Düsseldorf, Kunstsammlung Nordrhein-Westfalen, 2001 / Munich, Lenbachhaus Kunstbau Städtische Galerie, décembre 2001 à mars 2002.
- Le retour à l'ordre, Musée de l'Annonciade, Saint-Tropez, 2002.
- L'Art italien et la Metafisica 1912-1935, musée de Grenoble, 2005.
- Giorgio de Chirico, Musée d'Art moderne de la ville de Paris 2009.
- Apollinaire, le regard du poète, Paris, musée de l'Orangerie, 2016 — n°62.
