= Self-Portrait as a Soldier =

Painting by Ernst Ludwig Kirchner

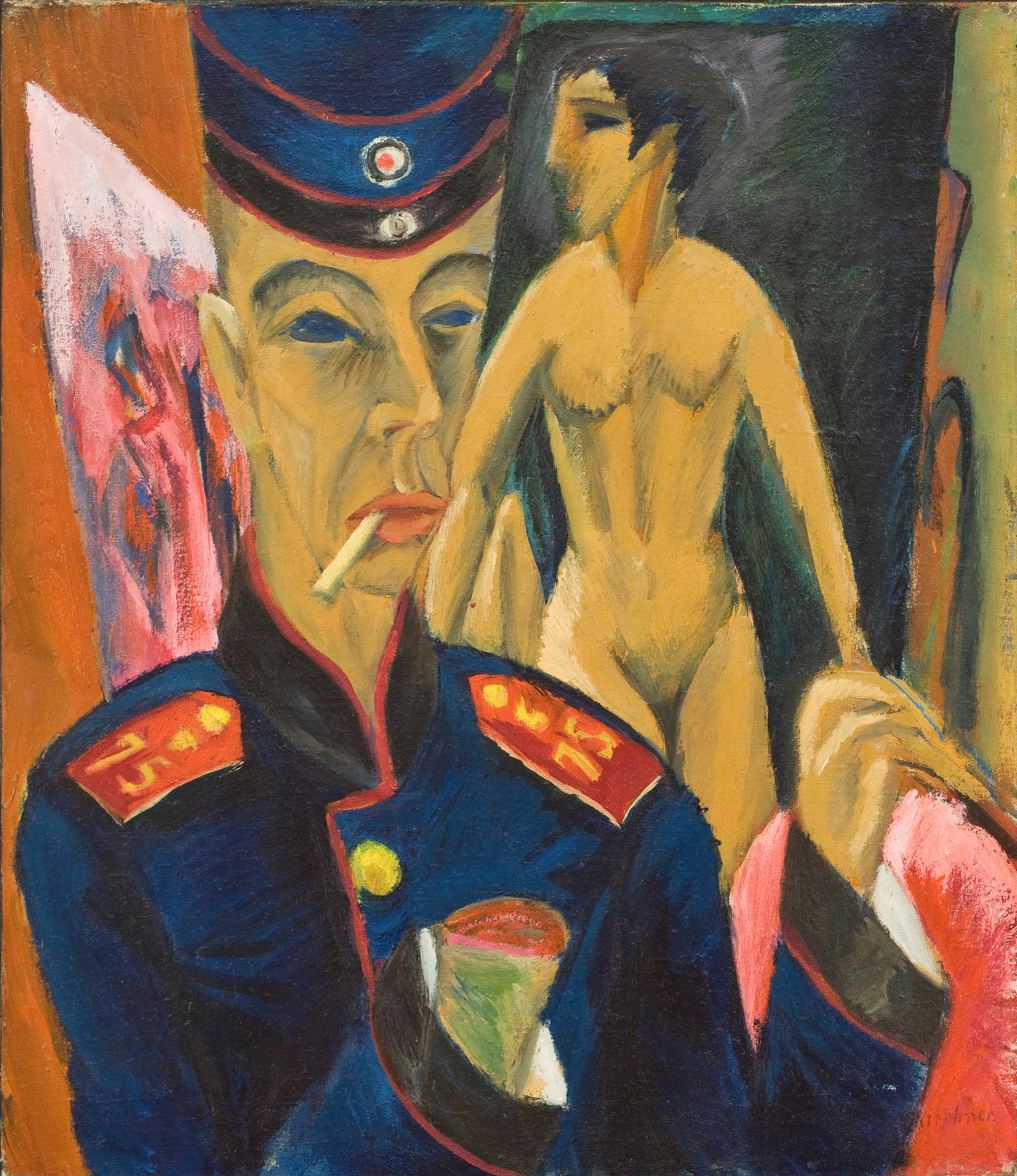
- Artist: Ernst Ludwig Kirchner
- Year: 1915
- Medium: Oil on canvas
- Dimensions: 69 cm × 61 cm (27 in × 24 in)
- Location: Allen Memorial Art Museum, Oberlin, Ohio

Self-Portrait as a Soldier, or Selbstbildnis als Soldat, is an Expressionist oil-on-canvas painting by the German artist Ernst Ludwig Kirchner. Kirchner created this self-depiction in 1915, following his medical discharge from military service during the First World War. The artwork measures 69 centimetres in height by 61 centimetres in width. The painting was first exhibited in the 'Städtische Galerie' in Germany between 1916 and 1919 and currently resides at the Allen Memorial Art Museum in Ohio USA. Critical interpretations of the painting attribute its stark Expressionist style and myriad of symbolic elements to the socio-political turbulence of Germany during the First World War. Self Portrait as a Soldier may be viewed as testimony to Kirchner's volatile mental and physical health and as a critique of the chaotic instability of Germany during the early 20th century.

== Subject matter ==
Self Portrait as a Soldier depicts Kirchner as a gaunt and utilitarian soldier wearing the 75th Mansfeld Field Artillery Regiment uniform. He stands in an artist's studio, positioned prominently within the artwork's foreground. A nude female figure, situated in front of a black canvas, is depicted behind him. The soldier holds up the bloodied stump of his right hand, which is juxtaposed against depiction of his left hand as deformed and claw-like. The soldier's military uniform is painted using rich blue and red colours. Skin tones of both the soldier and female figure are a sickly yellow. The artwork has a cropped composition, created by framing the figures with bright orange and green hues used in the background. Both Kirchner and the nude female figure are not drawn to scale. The Allen Memorial Art Museum cites that the "soldier has an elongated face and other blurred features, while the woman's shoulders are disproportionate to that of a true human form."

== Historical and socio-political context ==
Kirchner's 'Self-Portrait as a Soldier' was painted in 1915, a year after the commencement of the First World War (WW1). The impetus for Germany's involvement in WW1 was its alliance with Austria-Hungary who declared war on Serbia on 28 July 1914, following the assassination of Archduke Franz Ferdinand. The German invasion of Belgium in 1914 saw Britain declare war on Germany. The alliance system of WW1 pitted the Centrals Powers, encompassing Germany, Austria-Hungary, the Ottoman Empire and Bulgaria against the Allied Powers which compromised Russia, France, Great Britain and the United States. Throughout the war non-material and material living standards and civil liberties in Germany were extremely poor. Mary Cox's 'The First World War and the Blockade of Germany, 1914–1919' cites "that economic warfare in Germany was premeditated and designed to swiftly destroy German's entire economic and financial system." As well as "the destruction of Germany's communication and financial systems". Cox also states that "the blockade was to blame for the listlessness of German youth and their increased involvement in criminal activities". Matthias Blum contends that the "economic and physical deprivation" of WW1 left "deep scars of various kinds" upon Germany. Ultimately, Britain's naval blockade against Germany established to restrict the supply of food, oil and weaponry from 1914 to 1915 caused "deliberate starvation of citizens", disease and death amounting to comprehensive reduction of socio-cultural and political stability.

Trench warfare characterised WW1 and resulted in extended periods of gunfire across trenches. Artillery fire caused what is now recognised as post-traumatic stress disorder (PTSD). The mental and physical health of soldiers was further jeopardised by the squalor of trenches where corpses, rats, poisonous water, freezing cold temperatures, disease and malnutrition were common. Kirchner was discharged from active military service due to physical and mental incapacity. Subsequently, he suffered from "war neurosis and depression" which fuelled drug and alcohol addictions leading to severely diminished health in the years following 1915.

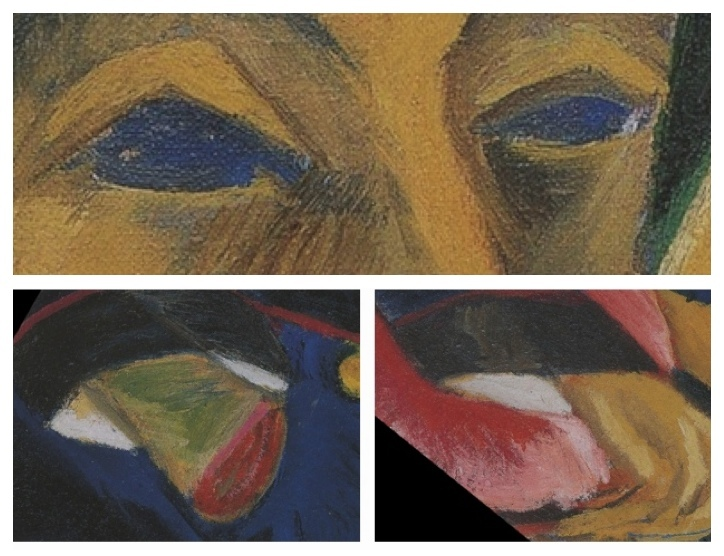
Three close-up perspectives of'Self-Portrait as a Soldier'.

== Visual analysis ==
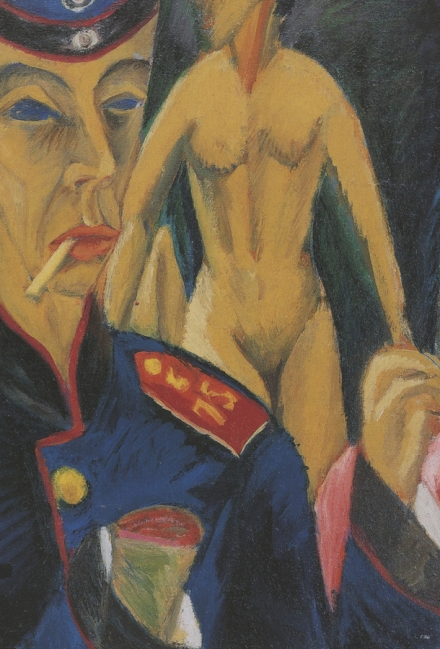
Nude female figure in the background of 'Self-Portrait as a Soldier'

Self Portrait as a Soldier depicts Kirchner smoking a cigarette which hangs loosely from his lips. Common analysis of this suggests that Kirchner has chosen to depict himself within a state of thought. This draws on firm precedence for the act of smoking as "a symbol for metamorphic imagination, while tobacco itself intoxicates the mind". Within 'Ernst Ludwig Kirchner's Self Portrait as a Soldier', Peter Springer postulates that the soldier's dark blue eyes emanate lifelessness and emphasise constant preoccupation with the horrors of war through their reflection of the blue military uniform. Kirchner uses an intense bright blue to create the uniform's fabric. This tonal choice sharply contrasts with the lighter, sickly yellow hues of the soldier's skin. Critical interpretation of the work stresses how these colour choices drain the soldier's face of vitality which emphasise his weakness and despondency. In 'The diagnosis of art: Ernest Ludwig Kirchner's nervous breakdown' by Jeffery. K Aronoson, and Manoj Ramachandram, the use of jaundice green and gory red colours are said to highlight that the injury is recent and unhealed. Much like the psychological scars of Kirchner's military service. Kirchner has juxtaposed his stump against the long, distorted fingers of his left hand which appears claw like. Art historians have speculated that distortion of these fingers is intended to create a paintbrush for a hand. For many art historians, Kirchner's fictitious self-depiction as an amputee is notable. The imagery of self-amputation may underscore the loss and fear felt by Kirchner regarding his artistic abilities and manhood following military service. Behind his self-depiction Kirchner has included a naked female figure. The use of harsh black outlines to define the woman's emaciated figure emulate strong Primitivist influence. Peter Springer, among others, suggests that the relationship between Kirchner's self-depiction and the female figure hints at tension and animosity. It is proposed that the differences in scale between the two subjects emphasises the corruption of power and imbalance of gendered autonomy and responsibility.

The careful selection and amalgamation of visual and symbolic features in Self Portrait as a Soldier can be read as Kirchner's ultimate condemnation of military conscription. The Allen Memorial Art Museum propound that Kirchner's exaggerated depiction of the severe psychological and physical consequences of military service underlie an "unshakeable, almost pathological fear of the effects of war on himself as an artists and human being". Similarly, Claudia Siebrecht divulges that "through his art, Kirchner revealed himself to the world as a man crippled by the experience of war, and as someone whose pre-war existence and masculine self-had been eradicated."

== Style and techniques ==
Self-Portrait as a Soldier is marked by Kirchner's distinctive Expressionist style and affinity for Primitivist influences.

=== Expressionism ===
Expressionism flourished between approximately 1905 to 1920 within Europe, emerging in Germany prior to WW1. Kirchner was a founding member and prominent advocate for Die Brücke, an Expressionist group founded in 1905. Expressionism was concerned with the expression of emotions and heightened individuality in opposition to bourgeois life fuelled by industrialisation and urbanisation. The movement symbolised artistic revolt against traditional aesthetics, techniques and appraisal of art. Expressionism advocated the expression of one's "internal emotion rather than external impressions". The amplification and distortion of form and colour, often non-naturalistic in hue, was central to Expressionism. Kirchner's 'Self-Portrait as a Soldier' epitomises Expressionism through depiction of the horrors of war and of Kirchner's internal psyche and individual symbolic reflection upon anxiety, disability and anguish. Technical application of oil paint to create Self Portrait as a Soldier also relays Expressionist influence. Peter Springer states that the work's thin, sharp directional lines and the perceived volatility of paint application evoke Kirchner's nervous activity in creating the work.

=== Primitivism ===
'Self-Portrait as a Soldier' also exhibits Primitivist influence, notably through Kirchner's androgynous naked female figure and the use of thin, sharp outlines to emphasise the "sketchy abstraction, mask-like rigidity and stark stylisation" of form. "Primitive Art", pertaining to the art and ritual objects of ancient cultures, notably from African or Central Asian regions, was as great passion of Kirchner's and a further reason for the denunciation of his art as 'degenerate' during the Nazi regime.

=== Technical notes ===
The Allen Memorial Art Museum's catalogue (AMAM) provides key technical notes upon 'Self-Portrait as a Soldier'. The museum cites that "paint is applied evenly with visible brushstrokes completely covering the ground. Forms are outlined in black; colours are worked wet-in-wet." With regards to the presentation and preservation of the work, AMAM's catalogue states that "the original plain-weave canvas was line, re-stretched on an ICA-type spring stretcher, and coated with a synthetic varnish in 1956". The painting is in good condition apart from observation that "the back of the lining canvas was treated with an aluminium paint and the edges covered with black tape. This tape has since caused some staining to the perimeter of the original paint surface." Ultimately, AMAM cites that "minor in-painting and fills at the corners and along the top edge" of the artwork are the only significant signs of deterioration.

== Nazi-era classification as "degenerate art" ==
The confiscation and denunciation of 'Self-Portrait as a Soldier' by National Socialists profoundly shaped the work's political identity and notoriety. The Nazi regime, active in Germany from 1933 to 1945, upheld a strong anti-Bolshevik agenda which amounted to vehement rejection of modern art. In 1937, Kirchner's 'Self-Portrait as a Soldier', amongst other works, was confiscated by National Socialists and branded 'degenerate'. The Nazi regime "suppressed art whose content they perceived as a threat to traditional values and institutions." This facilitated elimination of many modern art movements including Dadaism, Cubism, Futurism and Constructivism. The 6th division of the Reich Ministry of Public Enlightenment and Propaganda (Reichsministerium für Volksaufklärung und Propaganda) was responsible for the confiscation and banishment of Self Portrait as a Soldier to a Berlin warehouse. In 1937 'Self-Portrait as a Soldier' was displayed as part of an exhibition entitled "Degenerate Art" organised by Adolf Ziegler. Kirchner's Self-Portrait was retitled "Soldier with Whore" and exhibited alongside 650 works which were said to underpin "society's moral decay and [the] eroding [of] traditional family values". The condemnation of Kirchner's work as "degenerate" preceded his suicide less than a year later in 1938.

== Provenance and exhibitions ==
=== Provenance ===
Year	Gallery or Individual in possession	City	Country
1916–1919	Städtische Galerie (Dresden City Art Gallery)	Dresden	Germany
1919	Obtained by Art dealer Ludwig Schames	Frankfurt	Germany
1919–1937	Städel Museum (Also known as the Städelsches Kunstinstitut and Stâdtische Galerie)	Frankfurt	Germany
1937–1943	Confiscated by National Socialists during Nazi regime (Reichsministerium für Volksaufklärung und Propaganda) after classification as "Degenerate art". Stored in a warehouse alongside other such illegal artwork	Berlin	Germany
1943–1945	Kurt Feldhäusser		Germany
1945-unknown	Marie Feldhäusser (mother of Kurt who acquired his collection upon his death during a German air raid)	New York	United States
Unknown-1950	Weyhe Gallery	Brooklyn, New York	United States
1950–present	Allen Memorial Art Museum (Oberlin College)	Oberlin, Ohio	United States

=== Exhibitions ===
Year	Name of Exhibition	Nature of Exhibition	Gallery name	City	Country
1936	Der Bolschewismus	Group	Bibliotheksbau des Deutschen Museums	Munich	Germany
1937	Degenerate Art Exhibition	Group	The German Institute of Archaeology located in the Hofgarten	Munich	Germany
1939	Grosse Antibolschewistische (Great Anti-Bolshevik Exhibition)	Group	Organised by the Reichspropagandaleitung this was a travelling exhibition which supported the Nazi's 'Anti-Bolshevik' campaign	Various Major Cities	Germany
1952	In the Flat and the Round	Group	Modern Art Association	Cincinnati	United States
1952	Ernst Ludwig Kirchner	Individual	Curt Valentin Gallery	New York	United States
1954	Paintings and Drawings from Five Centuries: Collection Allen Memorial Art Museum.	Group	M. Knoedler & Company	New York	United States
1957	War and its Aftermath: 1914–1925.	Group	Busch-Reisinger Museum at Harvard University	Cambridge	United States
1958	Ernst Ludwig Kirchner, German Expressionist.	Individual	North Carolina Museum of Art	Raleigh	United States
1960	What is Modern Art?	Group	Toledo Museum of Art	Toledo	United States
1961	The logic of Modern Art	Group	The Nelson-Atkins Museum of Art	Kansas City	United States
1962	An American University Collection: Works of Art from the Allen Memorial Art Museum, Oberlin, Ohio	Group	London County Council	London	United Kingdom
1966	Treasures from the Allen Memorial Art Museum.	Group	The Minneapolis Institute of Arts	Minneapolis	United States
1968–69	Ernst Ludwig Kirchner	Individual	Seattle Art Museum	Seattle	United States
1968–69	Ernst Ludwig Kirchner	Individual	Pasadena Art Museum and Museum of Fine Arts	Boston	United States
1978	German and Austrian Expressionism, Art in a Turbulent Era	Group	The Museum of Contemporary Art	Chicago	United States
1979–80	Ernst Ludwig Kirchner	Individual	National Galerie	Berlin (also shown in Munich and Zurich)	Germany
1985	German Art in the 20th Century, Painting and Sculpture 1905–1985.	Group	Royal Academy of Arts	London	United Kingdom
1991	"Degenerate Art": The Fate of the Avant-Garde in Nazi Germany.	Group	Los Angeles County Museum of Art	Los Angeles	United States
1991	"Degenerate Art": The Fate of the Avant-Garde in Nazi Germany.	Group	The Art Institute of Chicago	Chicago	United States
1991	"Degenerate Art": The Fate of the Avant-Garde in Nazi Germany.	Group	Smithsonian	Washington	United States
2014	The Great war in Portraits	Group	National Portrait Gallery	London	United Kingdom

The table above does not provide sufficient information regarding exhibition after 1991 owing to a lack of information provided on the Allen Memorial Art Museum website.

== Sources ==
- Abrahams, Simon. "Kirchner's Self-Portrait as Soldier (1915)" Ever Painter Paints Himself (EPPH). Last modified 29 October 2013. https://www.everypainterpaintshimself.com/article/kirchners_self_portrait_as_soldier_1915
- Aronoson, Jeffery. K and Ramachandram, Manoj. "The Diagnosis of art: Ernest Ludwig Kirchner's 'nervous breakdown'" Journal of the Royal Society of Medicine 103, no.3 (2010): 112–113.
- Blum, Matthias. "Government decisions before and during the First World War and the living standards in Germany during a drastic natural experiment" Explorations in Economic History 48, no.4 (2011):556–567
- Clegg, Elizabeth "Kirchner: Expressionism and the City Dresden and Berlin 1905–1918", Apollo Magazine 158, no. 500 (2003): 55–56
- Cox, Mary. E. "The First World War and the Blockade of Germany, 1914–1919", in Hunger in War and Peace. Edited by Mary. E Cox, 1–51. Oxford: Oxford University Press, 2019
- Ettlinger, L. D. "German Expressionism and Primitive Art." The Burlington Magazine 110, no. 781 (1968): 191–201.
- Gaehtgens, Thomas. W and Foerschner, Anja. "Ernst Ludwig Kirchner's Drawings of the Apocalypse" Getty Research Journal 6 (2014): 83–102
- Gee, Malcom. "Ernst Ludwig Kirchner" The Burlington Magazine 145, no.1206 (2003):661–662
- Goggin, Mary–Margaret. "'Decent' vs. 'Degenerate' Art" Art Journal 50, no.4 (1991):84–92
- Hamburger, Daniel. "German Expressionist Art" Allen Memorial Art Museum, Last modified June 13, 2015. http://www2.oberlin.edu/amam/Kirchner_SelfPortrait.htm
- Kaiser, David. E. "Germany and the Origins of the First World War." The Journal of Modern History 55, no.3 (1983):442–474
- Kornfeld, E.W and Stauffer, Christine, E. "Biography Ernst Ludwig Kirchner" Kirchner Museum Davos. Last Modified 1992. http://www.kirchnermuseum.ch/en/el-kirchner/
- Langely, Edwina. "The Remarkable Expressionism of Ernst Ludwig Kirchner". AnOther. Last modified April 6, 2016. https://www.anothermag.com/art-photography/8551/the-remarkable-expressionism-of-ernst-ludwig-kirchner
- Levi, Neil. "'Judge for Yourselves!'—The 'Degenerate Art' Exhibition as Political Spectacle" The MIT Press 85, (1998):41–64
- Mette, Meghan E. "Icon of Heroic "Degeneracy": The Journey of Ernst Ludwig Kirchner's Self-Portrait as a Soldier" Oberlin College Honours Theses (2016) 1–64
- Moseman, Eleanor. F. "E.L Kirchner, Czech Cubism and the Representation of Spirit in Portraiture, 1915–1918" The Space Between 4, no.1 (2008):12–34
- Peters, Olaf. "Fear and Propaganda: National Socialism and the Concept of "Degenerate Art"" Social Research: An International Quarterly 83, no.1 (2016)39–66
- Roggenkamp, Shawn. "Ernst Ludwig Kirchner, Self-Portrait as a Soldier" Smart History. Last modified 7 June 2016. https://smarthistory.org/kirchner-self-portrait-as-a-soldier/
- Siebrecht, Claudia. "The image of the soldier: Portrayals and concepts of martial masculinity from the Wars of liberation to the First World War in Germany" Journal of War and Cultural Studies 5, no. 3 (2012): 261–275
- Springer, Peter. Hand and Head: Ernst Ludwig Kirchner's Self Portrait as a Soldier. Translated by Susan Ray. Los Angeles: University of California Press, 2002.
