= Portrait of Edith (the artist's wife) =

Painting by Egon Schiele

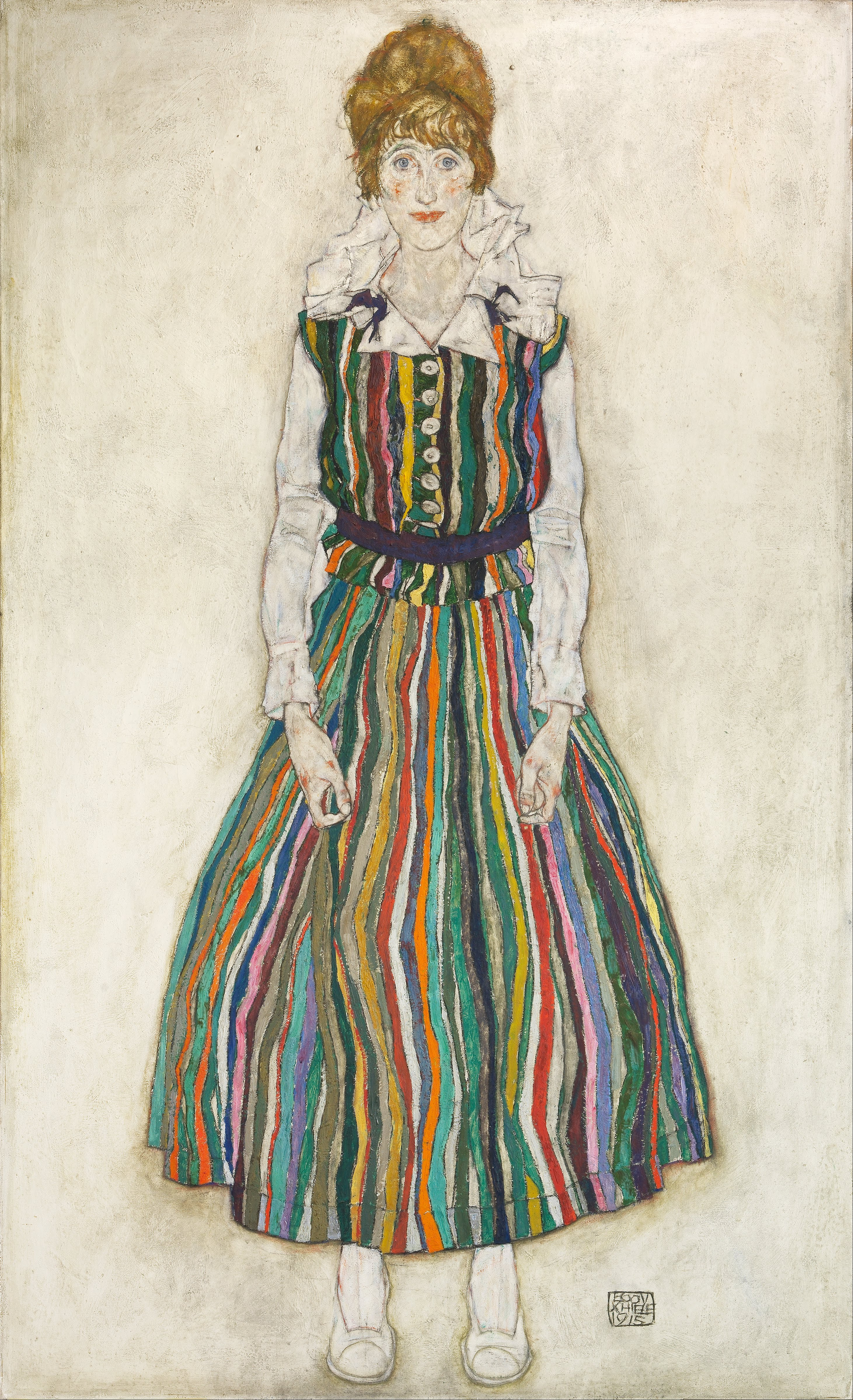
- Year: 1915
- Dimensions: 1,837 mm (72.3 in) × 1,147 mm (45.2 in)
- Location: Kunstmuseum Den Haag
- Accession: 0331896

Portrait of Edith (the artist's wife) is a painting by the Austrian artist Egon Schiele. The sitter is Edith Harms, "a middle-class woman from a well established family." It was painted in 1915, during a period of leave for Schiele from the First World War.

Schiele's paintings are renowned for their portrayals of stark nudity, but the portrait of his wife is in contrast to this. Her long, colourful dress covers her body and creates a much more modest image.

The painting hangs in the Kunstmuseum, in The Hague.
