= The Yellow Curtain =

1915 painting by Henri Matisse

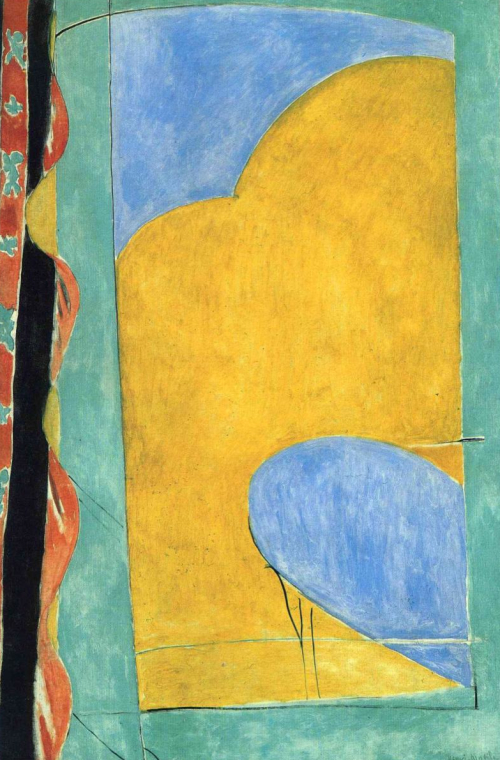
- Artist: Henri Matisse
- Year: 1915
- Medium: Oil on canvas
- Dimensions: 146 cm × 97 cm (57 1/2 in × 38 1/8 in)
- Location: Museum of Modern Art; New York

The Yellow Curtain (French: Le rideau jaune) is a painting by Henri Matisse created in 1915. Its size is 57 1/2 in × 38 1/8 in (146 cm × 97 cm). It is in the collection of the Museum of Modern Art, in New York.

Matisse's original title for the painting, Composition, draws attention to its abstract quality. Interviewed in 1931, Matisse explained that the painting represents a view from a curtained window in his home at Issy-les-Moulineaux, including the blue glass canopy that covered the front door.

It was donated to them as a gift of Jo Carole and Ronald S. Lauder, Nelson Rockefeller Bequest, gift of Mr. and Mrs. William H. Weintraub, and Mary Sisler Bequest, all by exchange.

== See also ==
- List of works by Henri Matisse
