= The Red Tower in Halle =

1915 painting by Ernst Ludwig Kirchner

Der Rote Turm in Halle
- The Red Tower in Halle (English)
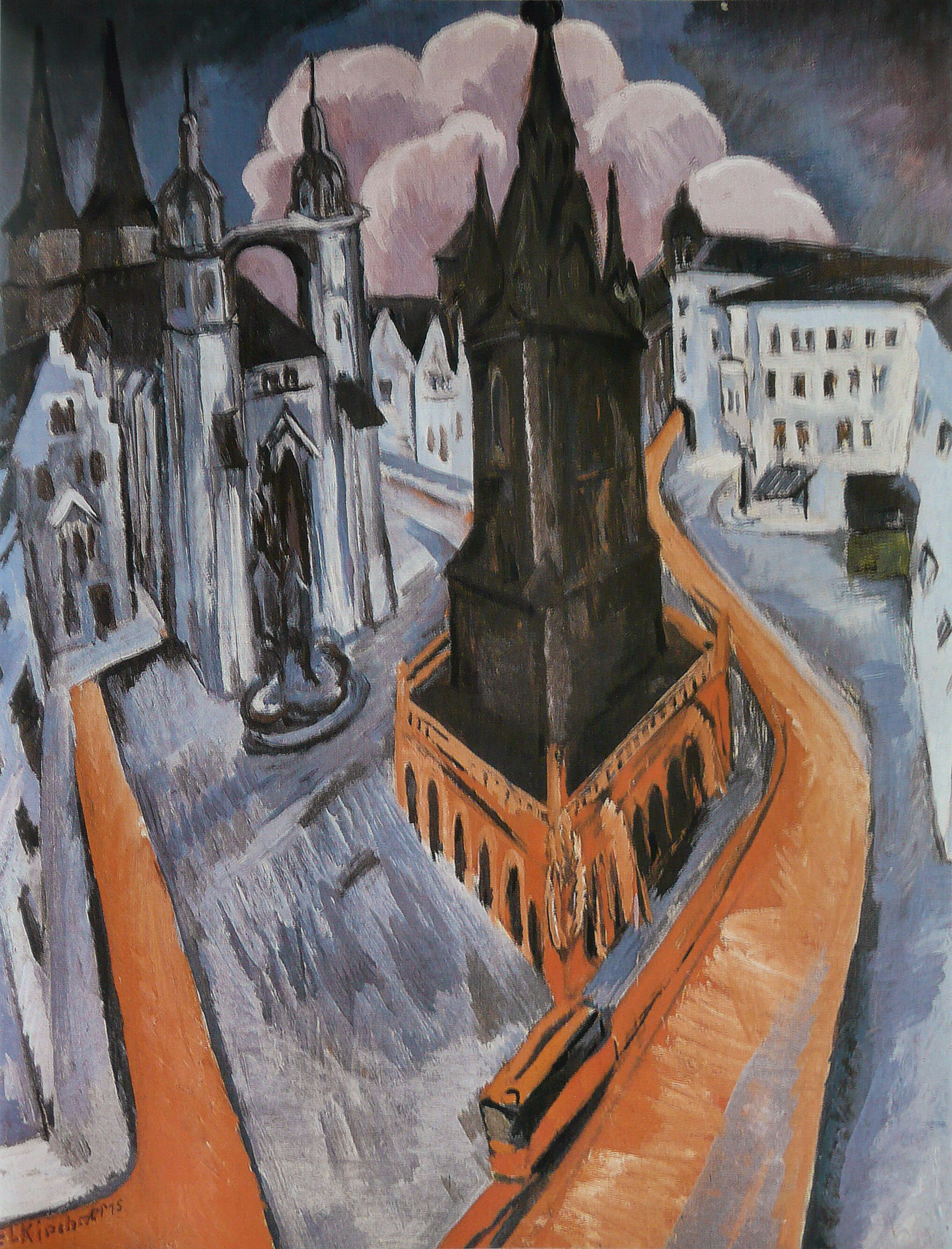
- Artist: Ernst Ludwig Kirchner
- Year: 1915
- Medium: Oil on canvas
- Dimensions: 120 cm × 91 cm (47 in × 36 in)
- Location: Museum Folkwang, Essen

The Red Tower in Halle (German: Der Rote Turm in Halle) is an oil-on-canvas painting by the German expressionist painter Ernst Ludwig Kirchner, executed in 1915. It is now housed at Museum Folkwang, Essen.

== Description ==
The painting shows the market square in the town of Halle with the Red Tower. The 15th-century neo-Gothic bell tower surmounts a red brick building. On the left stands the Marktkirche with its four towers. Only the tram crosses the deserted square. The view is plunging and unfolds parallel to the plane of the painting. Clouds of smoke in the background recall the proximity of war.
