= Art in Paris =

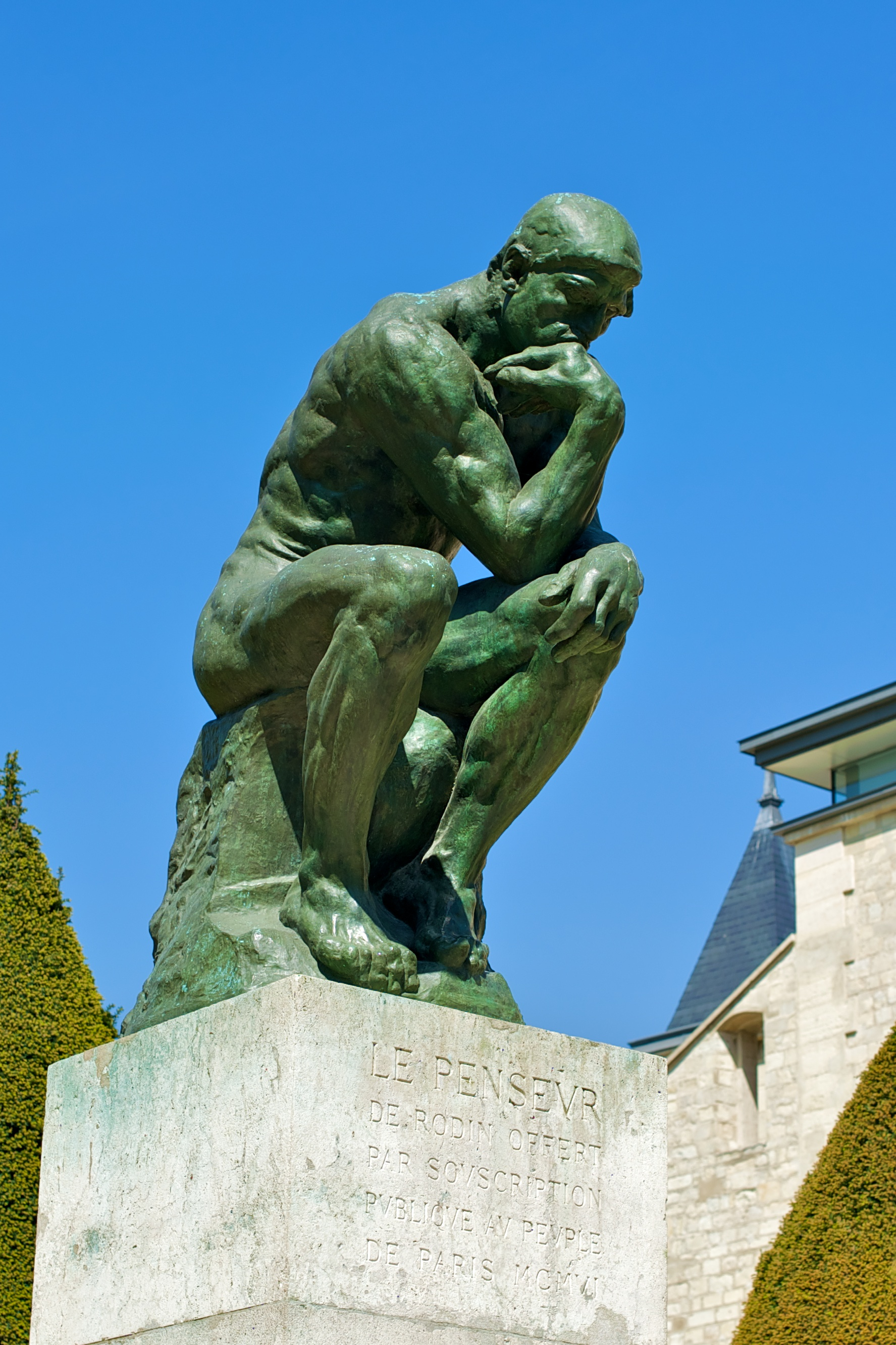
The Thinker, a bronze sculpture by Auguste Rodin

Mona Lisa, a painting by Leonardo da Vinci

For centuries, Paris has attracted artists from around the world, arriving in the city to educate themselves and to seek inspiration from its artistic resources and galleries. As a result, Paris has received a reputation as the "City of Art". In the city developed art schools and movements centered on French and immigrant artists, including the School of Paris. Home to some of the world's most famous museums and galleries, including the Louvre and the Musée d'Orsay, the city today remains home to a thriving community of artists. Paris is recognized globally for its public landmarks and masterpieces of architecture including the Arc de Triomphe and a symbol of France, the Eiffel Tower.

== History ==
Prior to the 12th century, Paris was not yet famed for its art. Italian artists were a profound influence on the development of art in Paris in the 16th and 17th centuries, particularly in sculpture and reliefs. Painting and sculpture became the pride of the French monarchy and the French royals commissioned many Parisian artists to adorn their palaces during the French Baroque and Classicism era. Sculptors such as Girardon, Coysevox and Coustou acquired a reputation for being the finest artists in the royal court in 17th century France. Pierre Mignard became first painter to the king during this period. In this medieval era, depictions of the Virgin Madonna and her Blessed Child were common, and were written to have shown Paris a "protective presence". They were frequently damaged, most of the time intentionally. One source states that one vandalised depiction preternaturally oozed out blood.

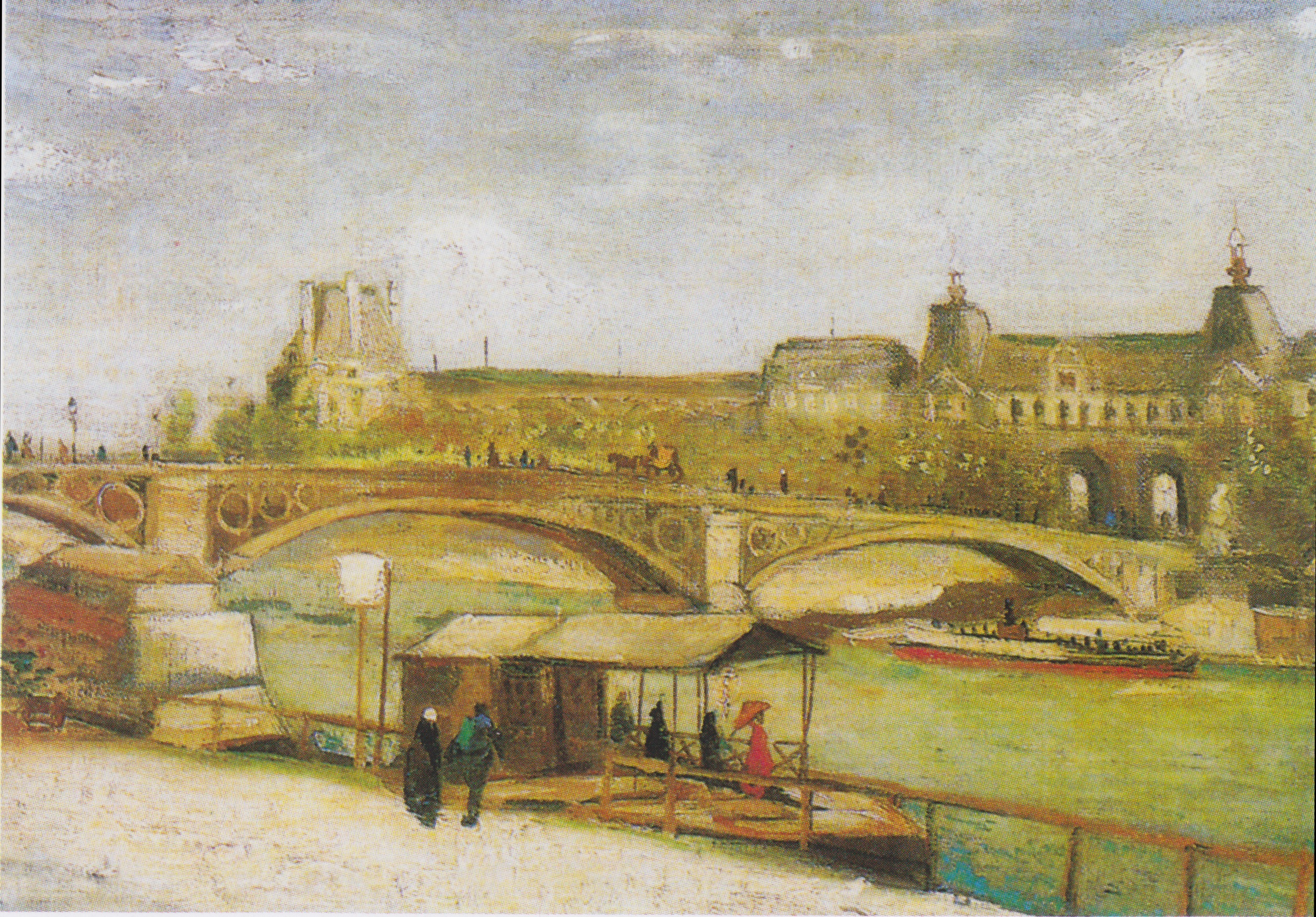
Vincent van Gogh, 1886, Pont du Carrousel du Louvre

Paris was in its artistic prime in the 19th century and early 20th century, when Paris had a colony of artists established in the city, with art schools associated with some of the finest painters of the times. The French Revolution and political and social change in France had a profound influence on art in the capital. Many painters moved towards using vibrant colours and elements of fantasy in their paintings, and Paris was central to the development of Romanticism in art, with painters such as Géricault.

Impressionism, Symbolism, Art Nouveau, Neo-Impressionism, Divisionism, Fauvism, Cubism, Art Deco and Abstract art movements evolved in Paris. In the late 19th century and early 20th century many artists worldwide flocked to Paris to exhibit their works in the numerous salons and expositions, such as the Salon d'Automne and Salon des Indépendants, to make a name for themselves.

Jean Metzinger, Le goûter (Tea Time), 1911, 75.9 x 70.2 cm, Philadelphia Museum of Art. Exhibited at the 1911 Salon d'Automne. André Salmon dubbed this painting "The Mona Lisa of Cubism"

Paris continued to exert a "strong pull on many aspiring artists from the French provinces" at the beginning of the 20th century. Many people, especially women, were attracted by the city's bohemian culture and anti-bourgeois attitudes and found that the city provided them with an artistic and sexual freedom to express themselves unlike in other areas of France. Groups of painters also moved to the city from abroad and formed their schools and galleries in the city, increasing its artistic diversity. For instance, the Académie Vassilieff, which was a special school founded for Russian art students, was specially popular with Russian female painters in the early 20th century, along with the Académie de La Palette, specialized in Cubism. The Académie Julian was established in 1868. Painters such as Vincent van Gogh, Paul Cézanne, Henri Rousseau, Pablo Picasso, Henri Matisse, Jean Metzinger, Albert Gleizes, Robert Delaunay, Fernand Léger, Henri Le Fauconnier, Juan Gris, María Blanchard, Amedeo Modigliani, Amédée Ozenfant, André Dunoyer de Segonzac, Roger de La Fresnaye and many others became associated with Paris. Following the Armory Show of 1913, New York City increasingly competed with Paris as a hub for artists, and its museums acquired some of the world's most valuable paintings.

== Schools ==
In 1648, the Royal Academy of Painting and Sculpture was established to accommodate for the dramatic interest in art in the capital. This served as France's top art school until 1793. Many American artists continued to learn their trade in Parisian schools in the 20th century. From 1900 to 1914, several academies were established in Paris by well-known artists, such as the Académie de La Palette, Académie Alexander Archipenko, Académie de la Grande Chaumière, Académie Humbert, Académie Matisse, Académie Ranson, Académie Russe de Peinture et de Sculpture, Académie Vasilieff, and Académie Vitti. Their competition included more established art schools such as the Académie Colarossi, Académie Julian, Académie Delécluse, and École nationale supérieure des Beaux-Arts. The Golden Age of the School of Paris ended with World War II when surrealism became the trend, but Paris remains extremely important to world art and art schooling, with many schools and institutions catering to artists, including the Paris College of Art. Paris also has numerous institutions which specialize in teaching modern art forms, such as the Paris American Academy, which specializes in teaching fashion and interior design.

Other schools include:

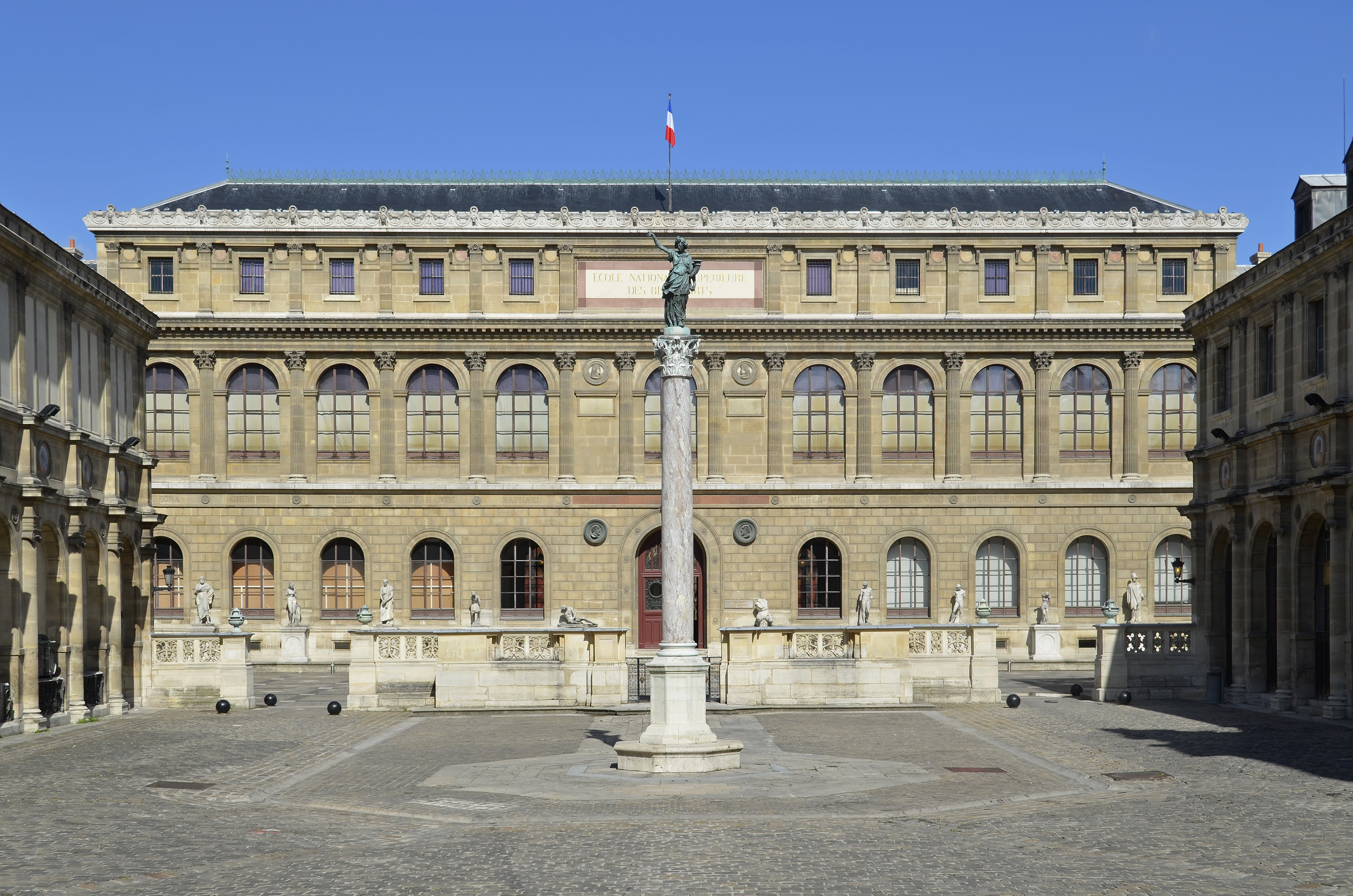
École Nationale Supérieure des Beaux-Arts

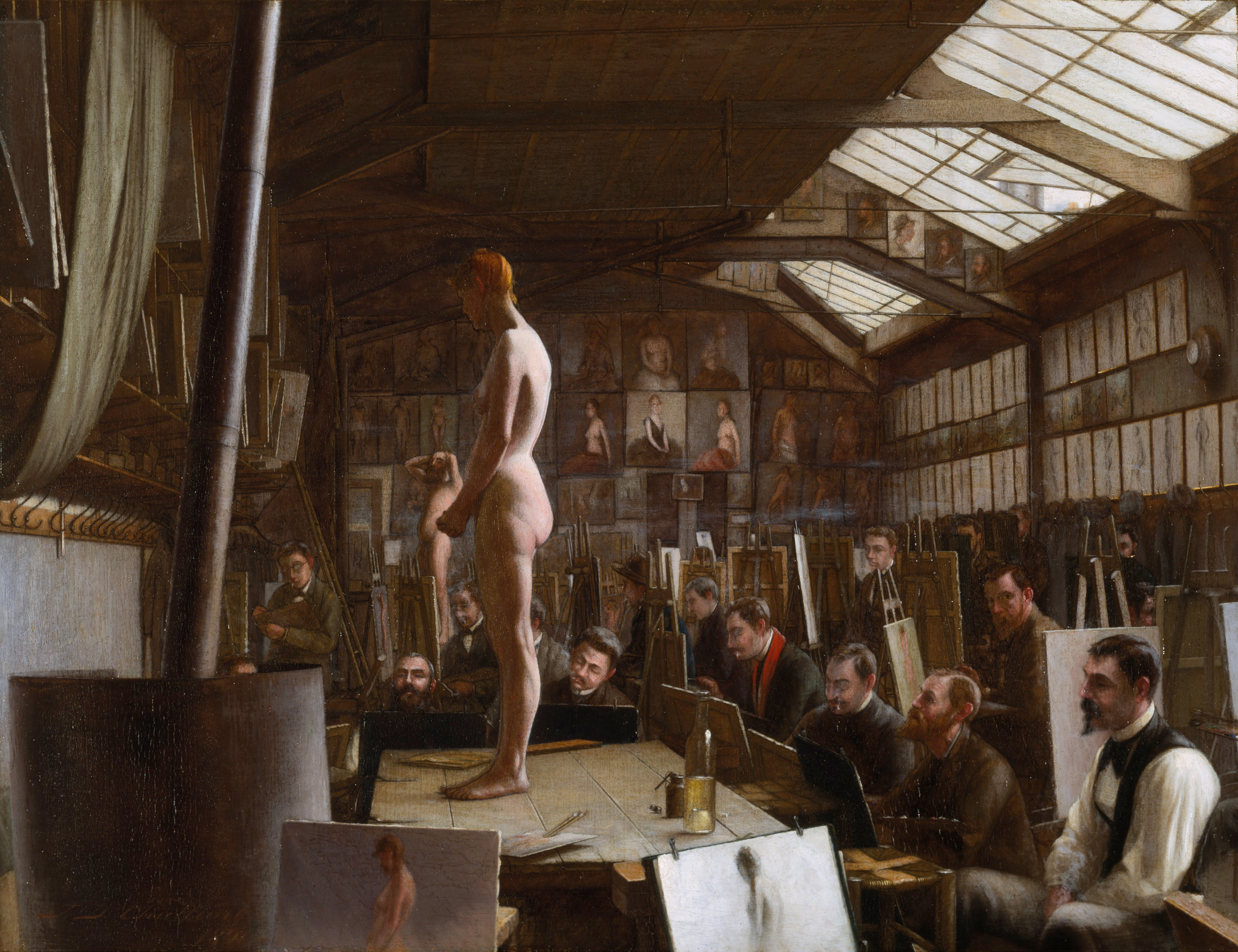
Académie Julian

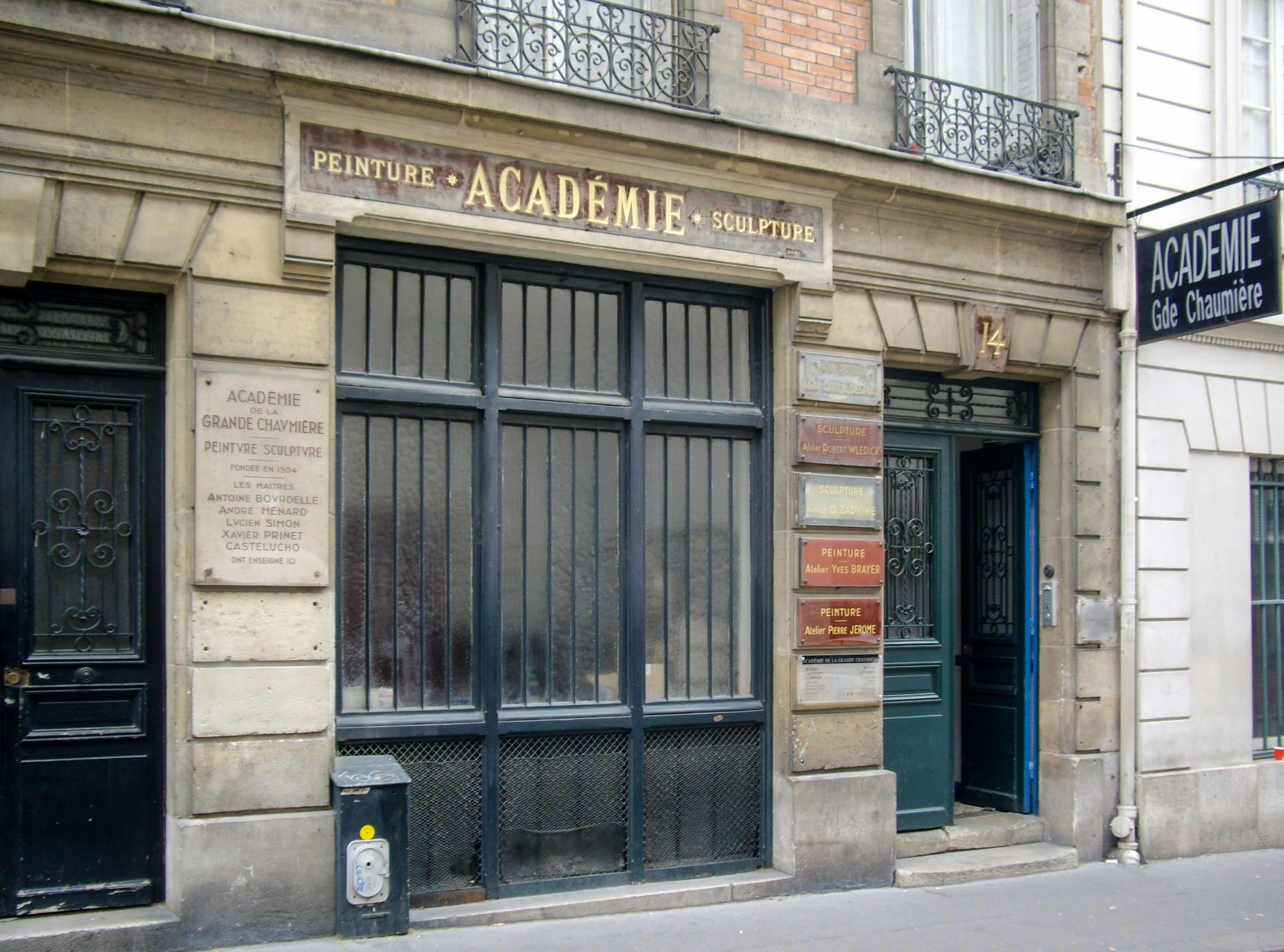
Académie de la Grande Chaumière

- Académie de La Palette
- Académie royale de peinture et de sculpture
- Académie Scandinave
- École Duperré
- École des Beaux-Arts
- École du Louvre
- École nationale supérieure des arts appliqués et des métiers d'art
- Gobelins School of the Image
- Institut des Hautes Études en Arts Plastiques
- Parsons Paris
- École intuit.lab

== Museums ==
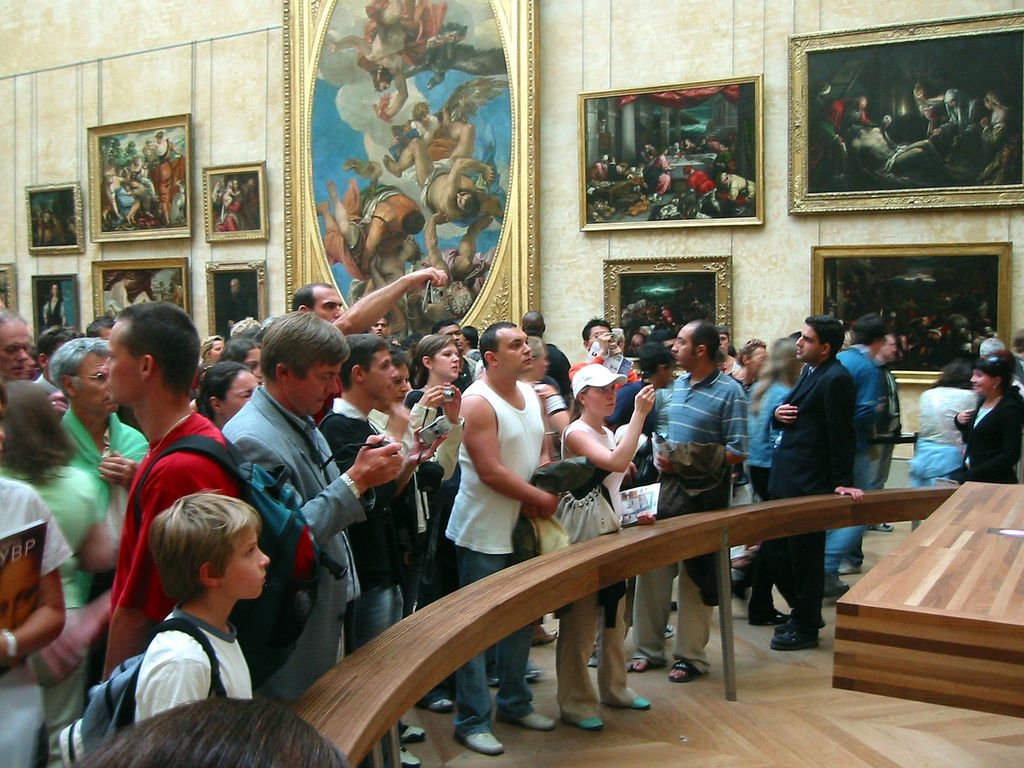
The Mona Lisa Room at the Louvre.

The Louvre is the world's largest and most famous museum, housing many works of art, including the Mona Lisa (La Joconde) and the Venus de Milo statue. Known as the Great Louvre, it is the national museum and art gallery of France. Francis I (a connoisseur of Art), initially started building the Louvre as part of the royal palace erected at a location where a 12th-century fortress of Philip Augustus existed. The palace underwent several additions over the centuries. Finally, after the court moved to Versailles in 1682, a proposal to convert the Louvre into a public museum was mooted in the 18th century, and in 1793 Musée Central des Arts in the Grande Galerie was opened to the public. Under Napoleon III, Louvre was further enlarged, and as completed, it has two main quadrilaterals and within two large courtyards. It is considered to possess one of the richest art collections in the world. Its collection is now mainly European art up to the Revolutions of 1848 as paintings of later date have been moved to the Orsay Museum that opened in 1986. Some of the master pieces held by the museum are of the Italian Renaissance painters, and Flemish and Dutch painters of the Baroque period. Some other notable galleries in the Louvre are the department of Egyptian antiquities (collection from 1826) and the Mesopotamian art (in the Near Eastern antiquities gallery).

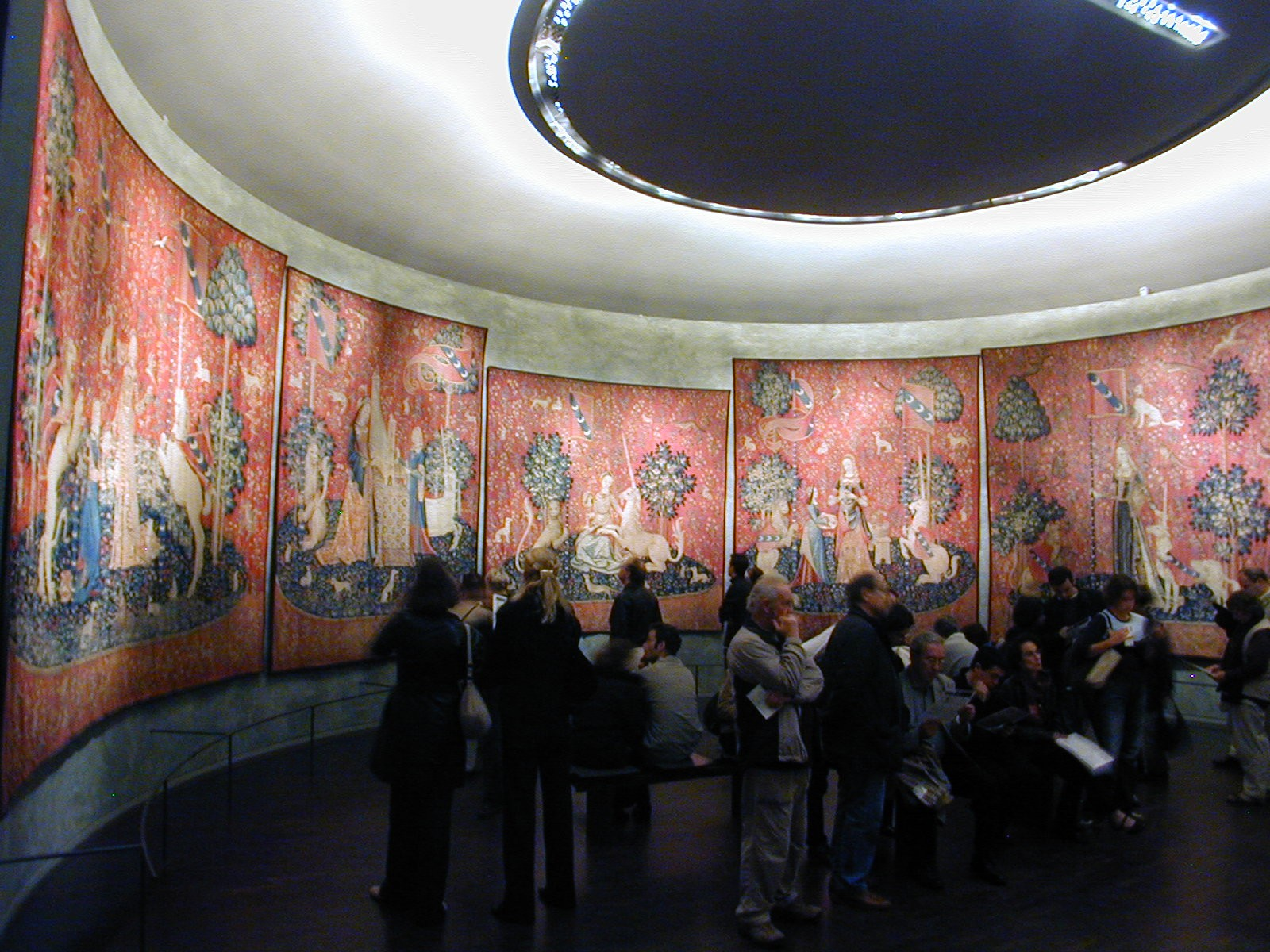
Lady and the Unicorn in the Musée National du Moyen Âge.

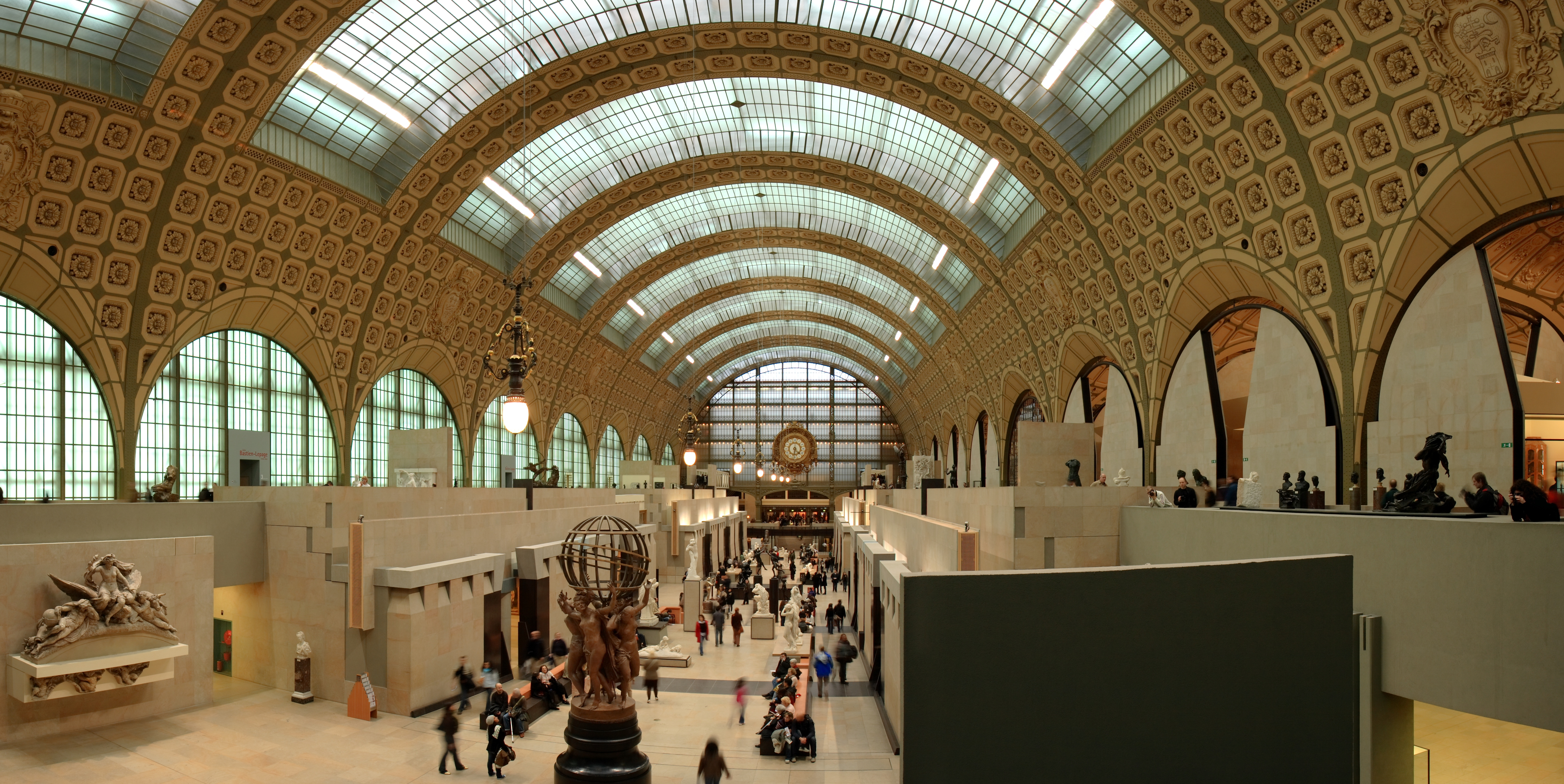
The main hall in the Orsay Museum.

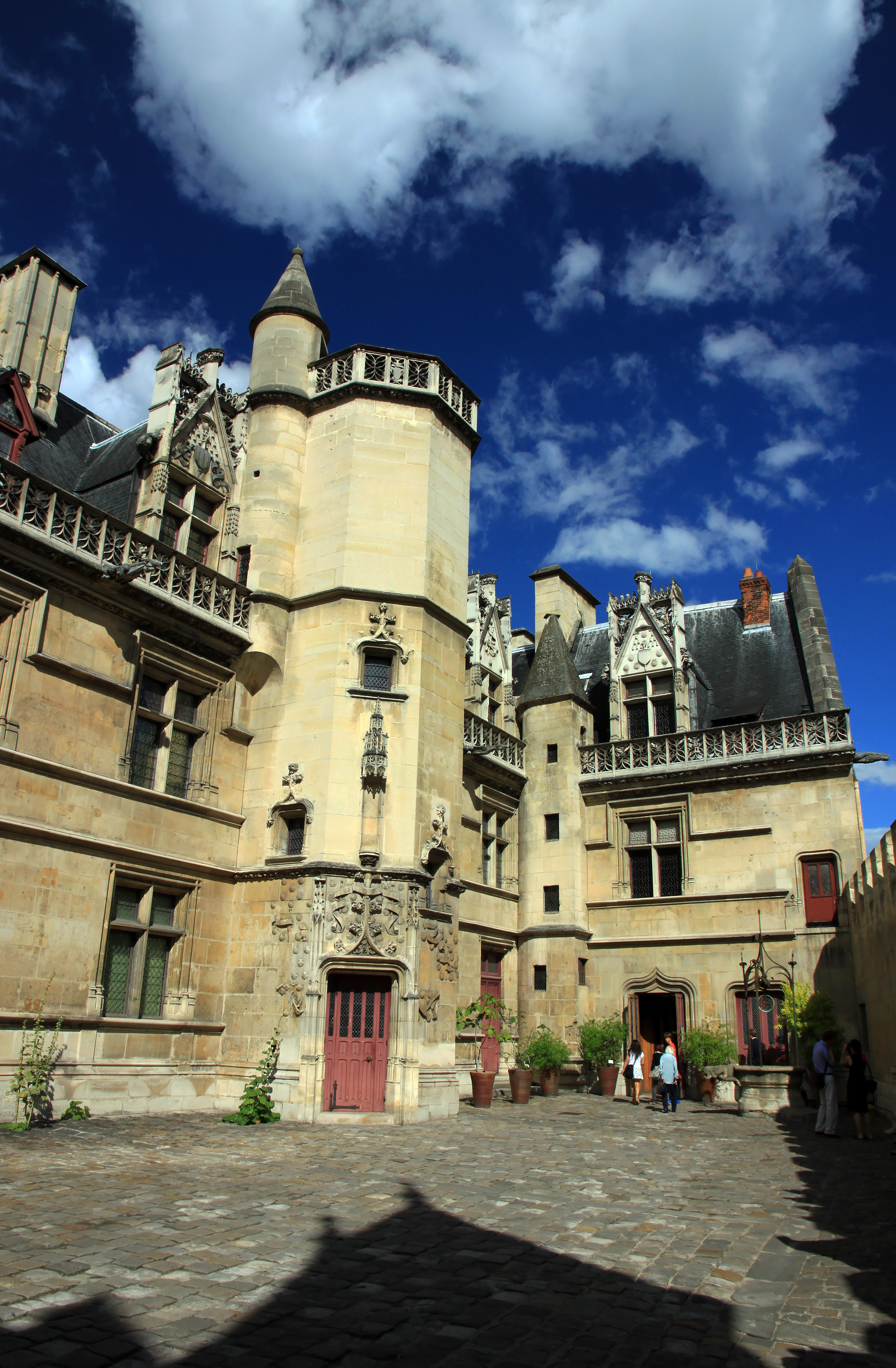
Musée de Cluny

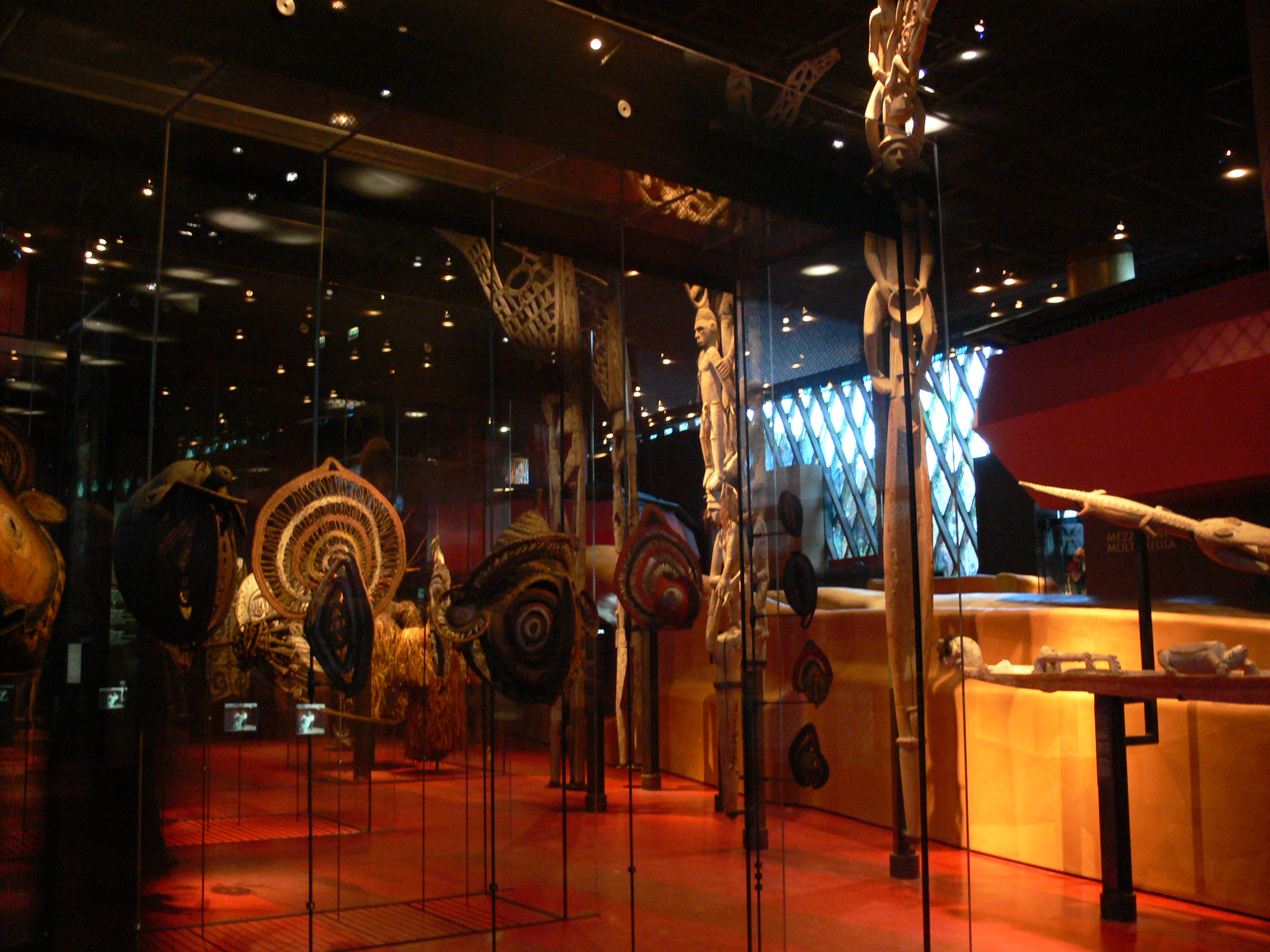
African exhibit at the Musée du quai Branly.

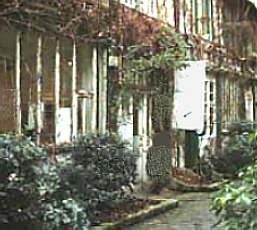
Musée du Montparnasse opened in the former studio of painter, Marie Vassilieff.

Works by Pablo Picasso and Auguste Rodin are found in the Musée Picasso and the Musée Rodin respectively. The Picasso museum, which was renovated in 2013, is housed in the Hôtel Salé, a mid nineteenth century edifice. It has a rich collection of 3500 drawings, engravings, paintings, ceramic works and sculptures by Pablo Picasso (1881–1973). It was gifted to the government by the kin of Picasso as compensation for the estate tax (droits de succession).

Art and artifacts from the Middle Ages and Impressionist eras are kept in the Musée de Cluny and the Musée d'Orsay, respectively. The Musée de Cluny is now named as the Musée National du Moyen Âge. It is housed in the Hôtel des Abbés de Cluny, a 15th-century monument built in medieval architectural style and also holds the remnants of Gallo-Roman thermes (baths) dated around to 200 AD, which is called the cool room. The exhibits in the museum are the former with the prized tapestry cycle The Lady and the Unicorn (La Dame à la Licorne), Netherlands tapestries of the late-15th-century, and gold, ivory and enamel artifacts including manuscripts which are lighted.

Paris's newest (and third-largest) museum, the Musée du quai Branly, opened its doors in June 2006 and houses art from Africa, Asia, Oceania, and the Americas, including many from Mesoamerican cultures. In 1998, under the same French president Jacques Chirac, Japanese cultural House in Paris (French: Maison de la culture du Japon à Paris) has opened offices near Eiffel Tower. This place show various exhibits on Japanese Art and Culture in Paris. Few art galleries have developed around those places. 7th district have been in recent years active location for new museums development.

The Orsay Museum is located in a refurbished former Orsay Railway Station (Gare d'Orsay), a large building in the Beaux Arts architectural style, on the left bank of the Seine River. The museum was opened in 1986 and has exhibits of French painting, sculpture, photography, and decorative arts of the mid and late 19th century; French academic painting and sculpture of the 19th century are by many artists "of the late Romantic and Neoclassical, Realist, Barbizon, Impressionist, Post-Impressionist, Divisionist, and Nabi schools." One of the few newly established contemporary art galleries is Ricardo Fernandes Gallery which is located inside the Marche Dauphine.

During the early 20th century, a group of artists referred to as the École de Paris, many of whom were of Jewish origin congregated in Montparnasse. The artistic community of Montparnasse is chronicled at the Musée du Montparnasse. The Musée du Montparnasse located in the 15th arrondissement, in Montparnasse Quarter was opened in May 1998. It was the workshop (atelier) of the Russian painter, Marie Vassilieff, in the early 19th century. Roger Pic and Jean-Marie Drot established the museum as a nonprofit operation. The museum presents a history of the many well known artists such as Amedeo Modigliani, Chaïm Soutine, Pablo Picasso, and others. It holds temporary exhibitions of works by Montparnasse artists of the past and present.

Starkly apparent with its service-pipe exterior, the Centre Georges Pompidou, also known as Beaubourg, houses the Musée National d'Art Moderne.

Many of Paris's once-popular local establishments have come to cater to the tastes and expectations of tourists, rather than local patrons, such as Le Lido on the Avenue Champs-Élysées, among others. The Moulin Rouge cabaret-dancehall, for example, is a staged dinner theatre spectacle, a dance display that was once but one aspect of the cabaret's former atmosphere. All of the establishment's former social or cultural elements, such as its ballrooms and gardens, are gone today.

== Sculpture ==
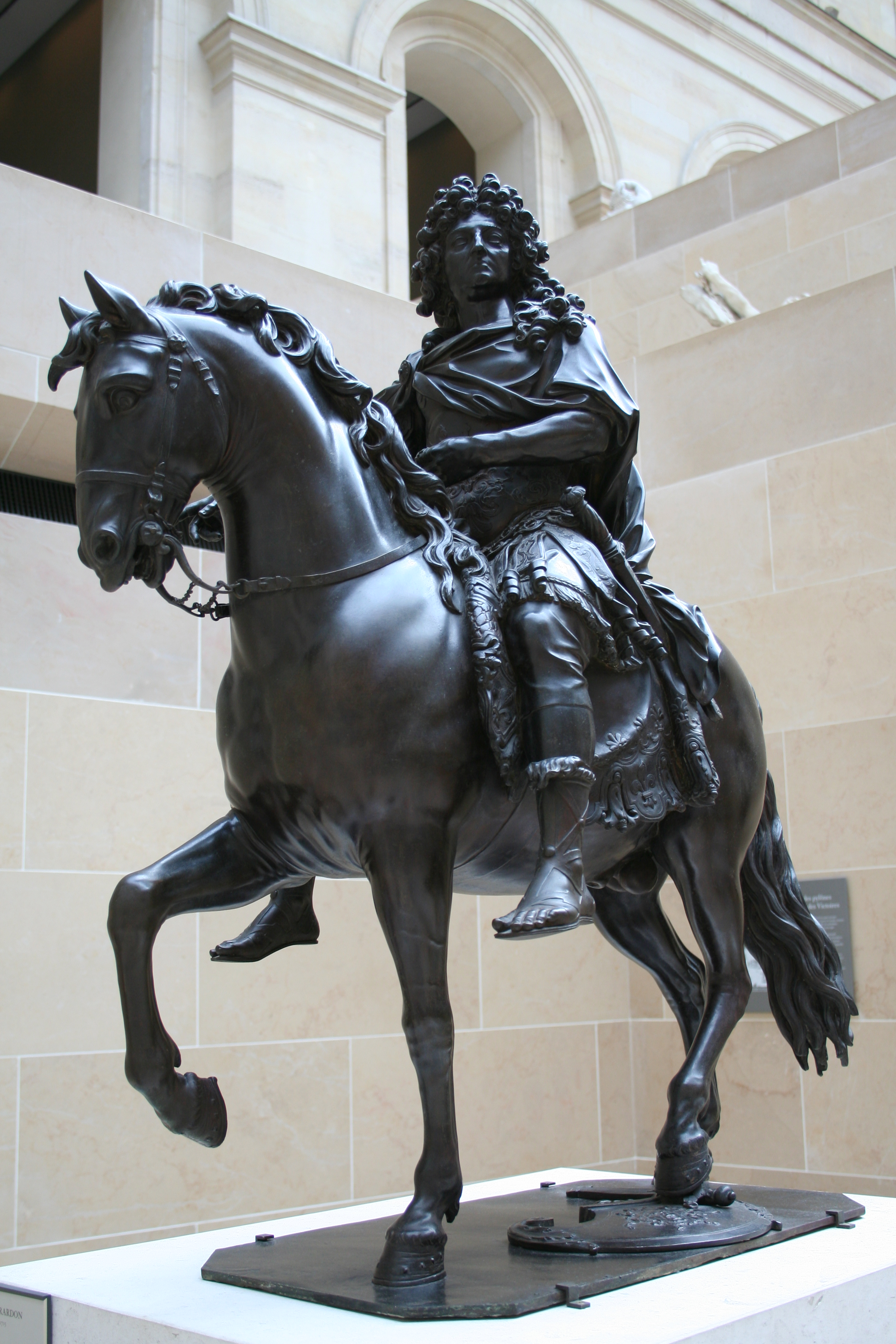
Louis XIV equestrian statue

The city is filled with sculptures. The equestrian statue of Louis XIV in the Place Vendôme is one of the largest pieces of bronze sculpture ever made, weighing more than 60,000 pounds, and was formed in one cast without a joint. Some of the other prominent statues in Paris are The Thinker, Venus de Milo, and Winged Victory of Samothrace.

== Photography ==
Like painting and sculpture, Paris has also attracted communities of photographers, and was an important centre for the development of photography; indeed inventor Nicephore Niepce produced the first permanent photograph on a polished pewter plate in Paris in 1825, and then developed the process with Louis Daguerre. Paris become the home of a form of photography, Surrealist photography. Numerous photographers achieved renown for their photography of Paris, including Eugene Atget, noted for his depictions of street scenes, Robert Doisneau, noted for his playful pictures of people and market scenes, Marcel Bovis, noted for his night scenes, and others such as Jacques-Henri Lartigue and Cartier-Bresson. Paris also become the hotbed for an emerging art form in the late 19th century, poster art, advocated by the likes of Gavarni.

== Events ==
The leading French art fair, Foire internationale d'art contemporain (FIAC), is a manifestation of contemporary art that has taken place every year since 1974 in October in Paris. For several days, this exhibition becomes the international meeting place between galleries, collectors, curators, museum directors and personalities from around the world. Another annual art event held in Paris is the Art Paris Art Fair. During 2013, the fair attracted more visitors than in the previous year, when 1500 artists (43% from foreign countries) participated. The fair had 57% of French galleries and 52% new galleries. The event for 2014 is proposed to be held from 27 to 30 March 2014 at the Grand Palais, with 144 international galleries likely to be on display. The theme proposed is modern and contemporary art including photography, design and art books.

== See also ==
- School of Paris
- Art in France

== Bibliography ==
- Berger, Robert W. (1 January 1999). Public Access to Art in Paris: A Documentary History from the Middle Ages to 1800. Penn State Press. ISBN 978-0-271-01749-5.
- Coburn, Annie; Poisson, Bernard; Vincens, Suzy (12 January 2007). Suzy in Paris: Guide to Unique Paris Promenades. Annie Coburn. ISBN 978-1-4196-2854-2.
- Elmes, James (1826). A General and Bibliographical Dictionary of the Fine Arts: Containing Explanations of the Principal Terms Used in the Arts of Painting, Sculpture, Architecture, and Engraving, in All Their Various Branches; Historical Sketches of the Rise and Progress of Their Different Schools; Descriptive Accounts of the Best Books and Treatises on the Fine Arts; and Every Useful Topic Connected Therewith (Public domain ed.). T. Tegg.
- Hazan, Eric (23 May 2011). The Invention of Paris: A History in Footsteps. Verso Books. ISBN 978-1-84467-800-6.
- Higonett, Patrice L. R (30 June 2009). Paris: Capital of the World. Harvard University Press. ISBN 978-0-674-03864-6.
- Lawrence, Rachel; Gondrand, Fabienne (2010). Paris (City Guide) (12th ed.). London: Insight Guides. ISBN 9789812820792.
- Michelin (2011). Paris Green Guide Michelin 2012–2013. Michelin. ISBN 978-2-06-718220-2.
- Montclos, Jean-Marie Perouse De (2003). Paris, City of Art. Harry N. Abrams. ISBN 978-0-86565-226-2.
- Nevez, Catherine Le (1 October 2010). Paris Encounter. Lonely Planet. ISBN 978-1-74220-503-8.
- Perry, Gillian (January 1995). Women Artists and the Parisian Avant-garde. Manchester University Press. ISBN 978-0-7190-4165-5.
