= Académie de La Palette =

Former art school in Paris, France

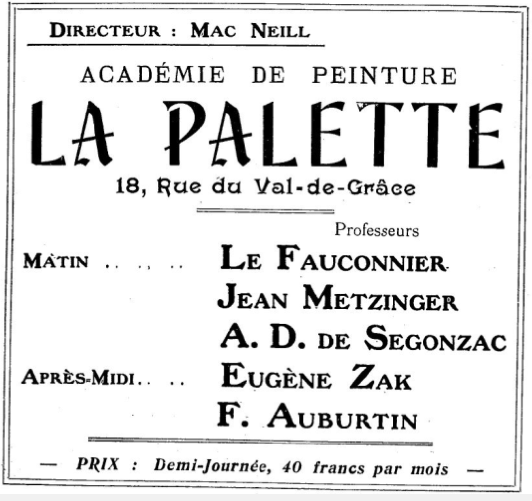
Advertisement for l'Académie de la Palette in La Revue de France et des pays français March 1912 (Paris)

Académie de La Palette (French pronunciation: [akademi də la palɛt]), also called Académie La Palette and La Palette, (English: Palette Academy), was a private art school in Paris, France, active between 1888 and 1925, aimed at promoting 'conciliation entre la liberté et le respect de la tradition'.

Early on the Académie de La Palette developed a reputation as a progressive art school. In 1902, with Jacques-Émile Blanche as director of the academy, the concept had been 'any attempt at imitation are now abandoned' [toute tentative d'imitation étant désormais abandonnée].

From 1912, when the Cubists Henri Le Fauconnier and Jean Metzinger took over the direction of the school, the role of the Académie de La Palette as the nexus for the avant-garde at the forefront of the Parisian art scene was secured.

== History ==
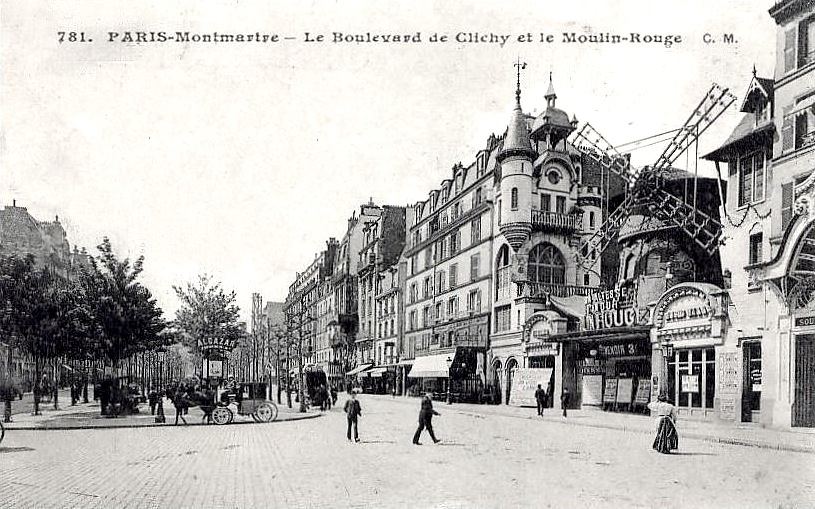
Paris Montmartre, ca.1900, Le Boulevard de Clichy et le Moulin-Rouge, 18th arrondissement of Paris. The Académie de La Palette, 104 Bld de Clichy, would be located toward the center of the photograph

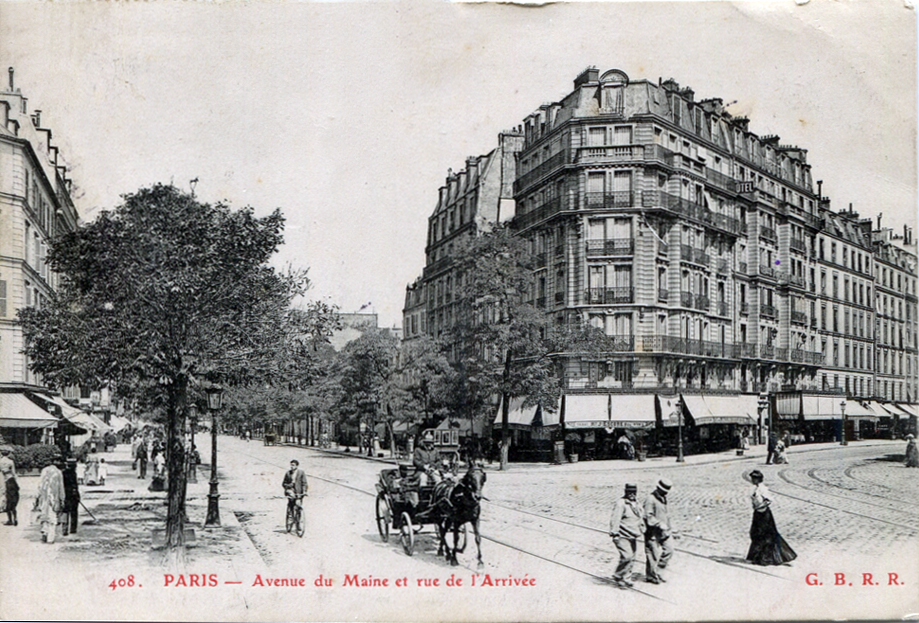
Paris, ca.1900, Rue de l'Arivée, Avenue du Maine, Montparnasse, 15th arrondissement of Paris

From 1900 to 1914 many academies were formed in Paris under the direction of well-known established artists, such as the Académie Matisse, Académie Alexander Archipenko, Académie de la Grande Chaumière, Académie Humbert, Académie Ranson, Académie Russe de Peinture et de Sculpture, Académie Vasilieff, and Académie Vitti. These schools had for competition not only each other but those already established academies that had become popular prior to the 1900s such as Académie de La Palette, Académie Julian, Académie Colarossi and the vast École nationale supérieure des Beaux-Arts.

According to some sources, the Académie de La Palette was originally located in Montparnasse, Rue de l'Arrivée in the 15th arrondissement of Paris, and may have had as founder the Swiss painter Martha Stettler, linking it to the Académie de la Grande Chaumière, also founded by Stettler. It remains unclear exactly when the academy was founded.

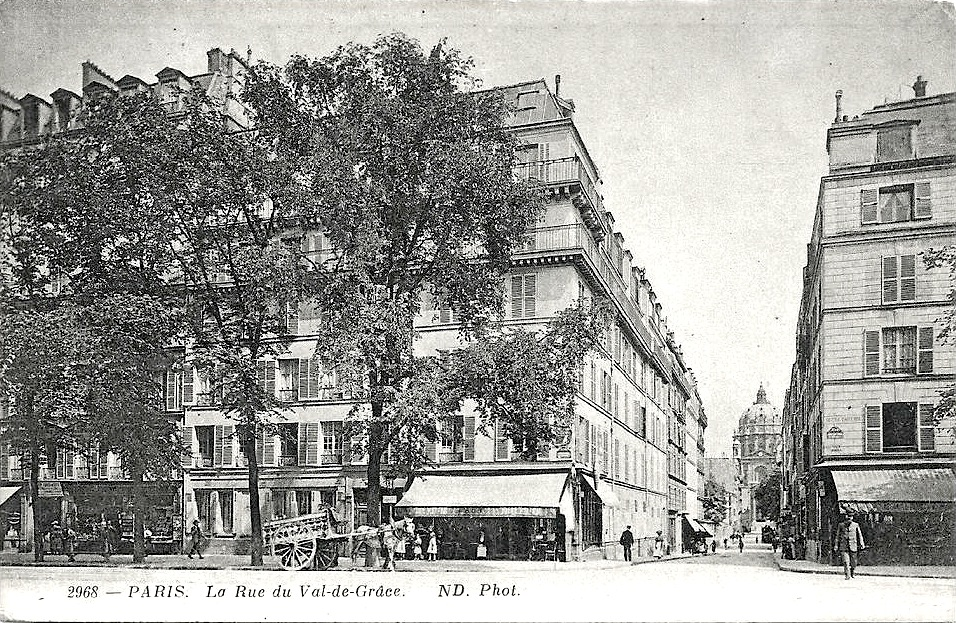
Rue du Val-de-Grâce, Paris, ca.1900

According to another source, the artist Fernand Cormon founded an art school in 1882 by the name of Atelier Cormon, at 10 rue Constance in Paris. In 1888 the academy moved to 104 Boulevard de Clichy in the 18th arrondissement of Paris where it became known as Académie de La Palette. At that location Eugène Carrière became a professor, along with Pierre Puvis de Chavannes. At that time artists such as Santiago Rusiñol studied at La Palette under Henri Gervex.

Between 1902 and 1911 Jacques-Émile Blanche directed the academy; his bilingualism attracting many English and North American students seeking exposure to the latest avant-garde tendencies. Under his tutelage instruction was offered in both French and English. Teachers during the early years included Lucien Simon, Charles Cottet, Georges Desvallières, who co-founded the Salon d'Automne, Edmond Aman-Jean, Lucien Simon, Charles-François-Prosper Guérin, René François Xavier Prinet (1861-1946) and others. According to a notice in the journal La Revue de France et des Pays Français (March–April 1912), Mac Neill had been the director of the school.

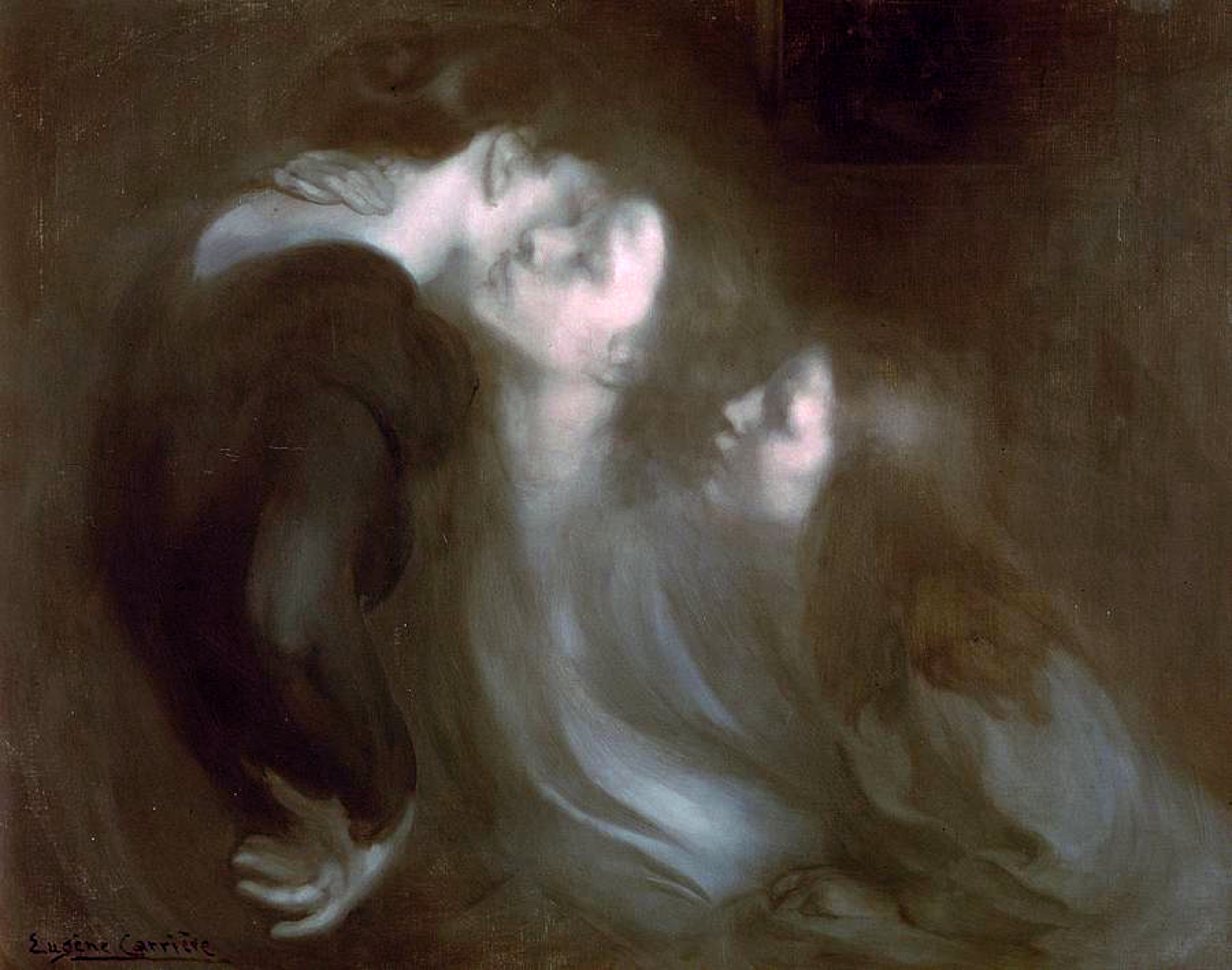
Eugène Carrière, 1899, Le Réveil, Le Baiser à la mère (Her Mother's Kiss), oil on canvas, 94 x 120 cm, Pushkin Museum, Moscow

In 1905 the Russians Sonia Terk, Elisabeth Iwanowna Epstein and Marie Vassilieff graduated from this academy. Fellow students at La Palette included Amédée Ozenfant, André Dunoyer de Segonzac and Roger de La Fresnaye.

At the outset of 1912 the art school relocated to 18 rue du Val-de-Grâce in the 5th arrondissement of Paris. In February, Henri Le Fauconnier was appointed to succeed Jacques-Émile Blanche as chef d'atelier. Le Fauconnier commissioned Jean Metzinger and André Dunoyer de Segonzac as full-time instructors for the morning sessions; Eugène Zak and Jean Francis Auburtin took over in the afternoon. Dunoyer de Segonzac had from 1907 attended the school and worked part-time together with John Duncan Fergusson.

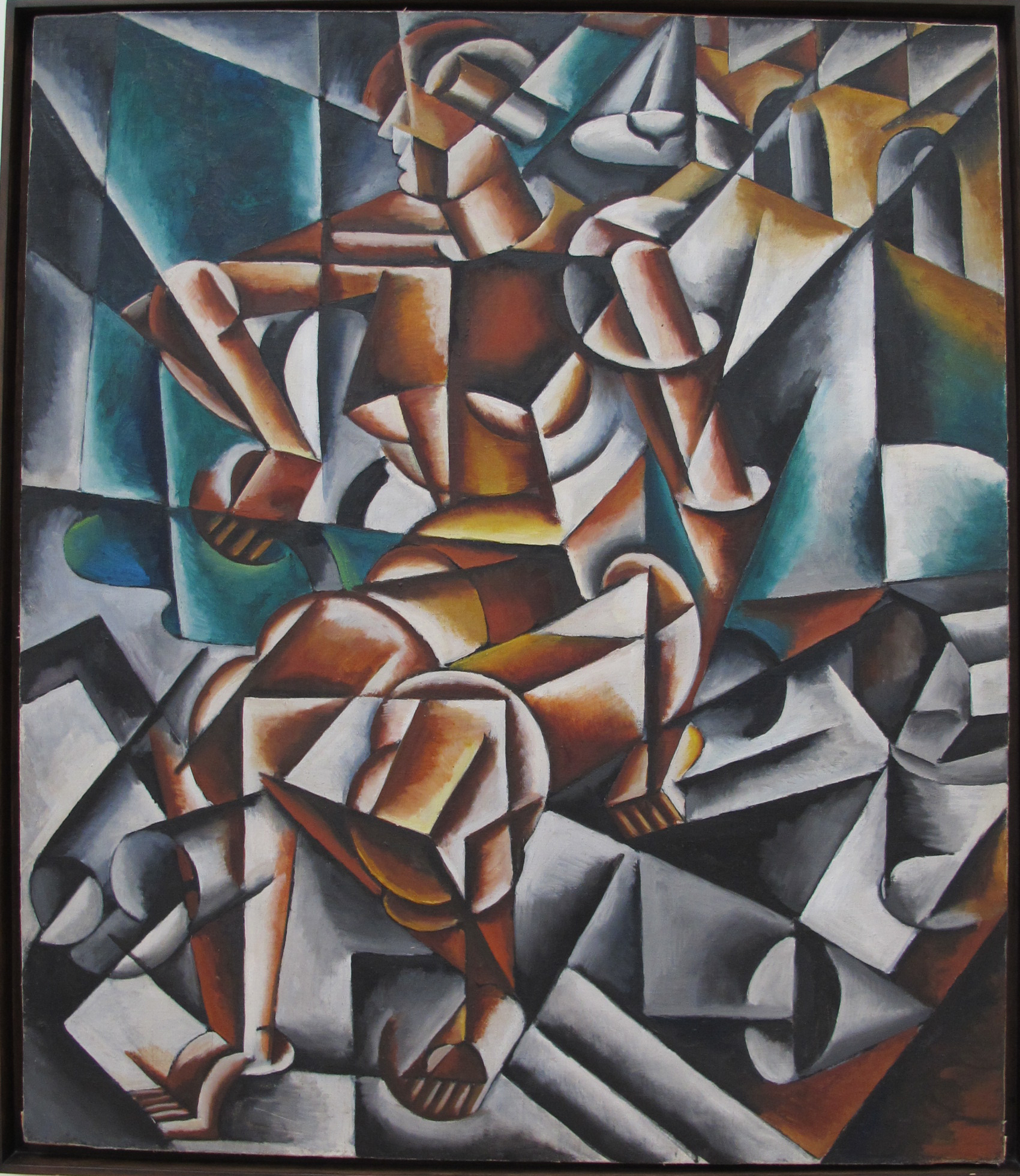
Lyubov Popova, 1912-13, Air Man Space (Sitzender weiblicher Akt)

Marc Chagall, 1911-12, Trois heures et demie (Le poète), Half-Past Three (The Poet) Halb vier Uhr, oil on canvas, 195.9 x 144.8 cm, The Louise and Walter Arensberg Collection, 1950, Philadelphia Museum of Art

At this time the academy primarily attracted French, Danish and Russian students. Some of the students known to have attended were Marcel Gromaire and Marc Chagall. Though Chagall's studies at La Palette were intermittent and succinct, it was there that Chagall frequented artists at the forefront of the Parisian avant-garde. His experimentations at the time centered on Fauvist colors and Cubist construction. His instructors were Le Fauconnier and Metzinger.

In the fall of 1912 Liubov Popova and Nadezhda Udaltsova enrolled at La Palette following the advice of Alexandra Exter. According to Udaltsova, Jean Metzinger encouraged the students to the visit galleries and salons where Cubist works were exhibited. The price for a half-day classes was 40 francs per month. Metzinger's students at La Palette included Serge Charchoune, Jessica Dismorr, Nadezhda Udaltsova, Varvara Stepanova and Lyubov Popova.

== Case histories ==
- Lyubov Popova began studying in the studios of Henri Le Fauconnier, Jean Metzinger, and André Dunoyer de Segonzac at the Académie de la Palette in Montparnasse December 1912 at the age of 23. Nadezhda Udaltsova writes in her diaries that Popova's "sketches are not bad except that all her figures are distended". Udaltsova later continues: "L.S. [Popova] is much bolder than I am. Metzinger has already praised her". Popova continues her work at La Palette until May, while Udaltsova returned to Moscow around February.

"In November 1912 I went to Paris with Liubov Popova", Udaltsova writes in her memoirs, "Sofia Karentnikova and Vera Petel also travelled with us although they soon returned to Moscow. After looking around, Popova and I began to search for a studio. Our intention had been to work with Matisse but his school was already closed, so we went over to Maurice Denis’s studio. But there we ran into a Red Indian with feathers sitting against a red background and we ran away. Someone then told us about La Palette, the studio of Le Fauconnier. We went there and immediately decided that it was what we wanted… Le Fauconnier, Metzinger and Segonzac used to visit the studio once a week. Le Fauconnier offered pictorial solutions for the canvas while Metzinger spoke of Picasso’s latest accomplishments. That was still the time of classical Cubism without all the vie banale – which first appeared in the form of wallpaper and appliqués in the works of Braque. Le Fauconnier was a ferocious expert and many a student trembled before the canvas. Both Le Fauconnier and Metzinger responded positively to my works and I was so happy when Metzinger told me two weeks later, “Vous avez fait de progrès extraordinaire” [“You have made extraordinary progress”]. How the students looked at me!. Another entry in Udaltsova’s diary reads: “Liubov Sergeevna [Popova] understood little of what Le Fauconnier was saying. Everything is broken down into a thousand lines; she has no feel for the plane".

Popova continued working in a Cubist style influenced in particular by Jean Metzinger through 1913.

- Joseph Csaky in 1910 won a scholarship in Szeged, giving him enough money to attend l'Académie de la Palette. He wrote of the direction his art had taken during the crucial years, and its relation to La Palette:

"There was no question which was my way. True, I was not alone, but in the company of several artists who came from Eastern Europe. I joined the cubists in the Académie La Palette, which became the sanctuary of the new direction in art. On my part I did not want to imitate anyone or anything. This is why I joined the cubists movement." (Joseph Csaky)

- Amédée Ozenfant around 1906 had enrolled in the Académie de la Palette, where he studied under Jacques-Émile Blanche and Charles Cottet. There he befriended Roger de La Fresnaye and André Dunoyer de Segonzac, his fellow students at the time.
- Aristarkh Lentulov, from 1910, studied under Le Fauconnier both at his private studio and at La Palette. Whilst there, he became acquainted with contemporary French painters such as Albert Gleizes, Jean Metzinger, Fernand Léger and Robert Delaunay. After absorbing Fauve and Cubist principles he developed his own unique style of painting with bright colors. After his return to Russia in 1912 he became a major influence on what would become the Russian Cubo-Futurism.
- Marguerite Thompson Zorach studied briefly with conservative painter Jean Francis Auburtin at the Académie de la Grande Chaumière, but was dissatisfied with the conventional style of painting. She enrolled at the more liberal Académie de la Palette where she began experimenting with Fauvism under the instruction of John Duncan Fergusson. During her time abroad, Zorach traveled extensively. She painted more abstractly, developing a style that was completely flat.

In 1911 during her last year in Europe, Thompson Zorach began classes at Académie de la Palette under Jacques-Emile Blanche and John Duncan Fergusson. The Frenchman, Blanche, was a liberal academician and successful portraitist known for his loose renderings of his friends Jean Cocteau, Virginia Woolf and Walter Richard Sickert. The Scot, Fergusson, known as the "Scottish Clourist" emphasized using bold color, impasto, brushwork and design elements. These artists/professors had a strong impact on Thompson as they were interested in the effects of luminosity and color, allowing her to refine her Fauvist tendencies. Jessica Dismorr attended classes at La Palette during the same period.

In 1912, she returned to Fresno and exhibited in Los Angeles. Disappointed with the poor reception of her paintings, Zorach moved to New York where she joined fellow La Palette student William Zorach whom she married later that year. In 1913, Zorach saw the work of Picasso and Braque at the Armory Show and began incorporating elements of Cubism in her work.

As a teacher at La Palette, Fergusson was crucial in the development of Thompson, more so perhaps than Blanche. Fergusson was in charge of a group that labeled themselves the "Post-Impressionists", even though they were all much closer to Fauvism stylistically.

- Henri Hayden, upon arrival in Paris in 1907 intended to stay for only a year, but lived in France until his death. He attended the Académie La Palette for several months, under the direction of Charles Guérin et Georges Desvallières.
- Sonia Delaunay-Terk, through Max Liebermann, an acquaintance of her uncle, came into contact with the German art world and went to live in Karlsruhe in 1903. She began studying painting at the studio of Schmidt-Reuter. Two years later she furthered her training at the Académie la Palette in Montparnasse, Paris. Unhappy with the method of teaching, which she thought too critical, she spent less time at the La Palette and more time visiting galleries and museums.
- Jessica Dismorr attended the Slade School of Art, 1902–03, before training under Max Bohm at Etaples. From 1910 to 1913 she studied at the Académie de la Palette under Jean Metzinger and was in the circle around the Scottish Colourist John Duncan Fergusson.

== Alumni ==
=== Directors ===
- Jacques-Émile Blanche
- Eugène Carrière
- Henri Le Fauconnier
- Mac Neill

=== Instructors ===
- Edmond Aman-Jean
- Jean Francis Auburtin
- Jacques-Émile Blanche
- Eugène Carrière
- Pierre Puvis de Chavannes
- Charles Cottet
- Maurice Denis (?)
- George Desvallières
- Maxime Dethomas
- Henri Le Fauconnier
- John Duncan Fergusson
- Roger de La Fresnaye
- Henri Gervex
- Charles-François-Prosper Guérin
- Pierre Laprade
- Jean Metzinger
- René François Xavier Prinet
- Santiago Rusiñol
- André Dunoyer de Segonzac
- Lucien Simon
- Eugeniusz Żak (Eugène Zak)

=== Notable alumni ===
- Yves Alix
- Boris Anrep
- Alexander Arnshtam
- Jean-Louis Boussingault
- Emily Carr
- Marc Chagall
- Serge Charchoune
- Roger Chastel
- Yvonne Chastel
- Joseph Csaky
- Sonia Delaunay
- Erik Detthow
- Jessica Dismorr
- Bernard Dorival
- Elisabeth Iwanowna Epstein
- István Farkas
- Jean Fautrier
- Roger de La Fresnaye
- Wilhelm Gimmi
- Édouard Goerg
- Duncan Grant
- Margaret Grierson
- Marcel Gromaire
- Henri Hayden
- Elemér Kóródy
- Henry Lamb
- Aristarkh Lentulov
- Georges Lepape
- Gustave Miklos
- Luc-Albert Moreau
- Vera Mukhina
- Albert Naur
- Vera Nilsson
- Amédée Ozenfant
- Amédée de La Patellière
- Vera Pestel
- Francis Picabia
- Lyubov Popova
- Alexander Romm
- Santiago Rusiñol
- André Dunoyer de Segonzac
- John Sten
- Varvara Stepanova
- Imre Szobotka
- Nadezhda Udaltsova
- Marie Vassilieff
- Marguerite Thompson Zorach
- William Zorach
- Ignacio Zuloaga
