= Charles-François-Prosper Guérin =

French painter (1875–1939)

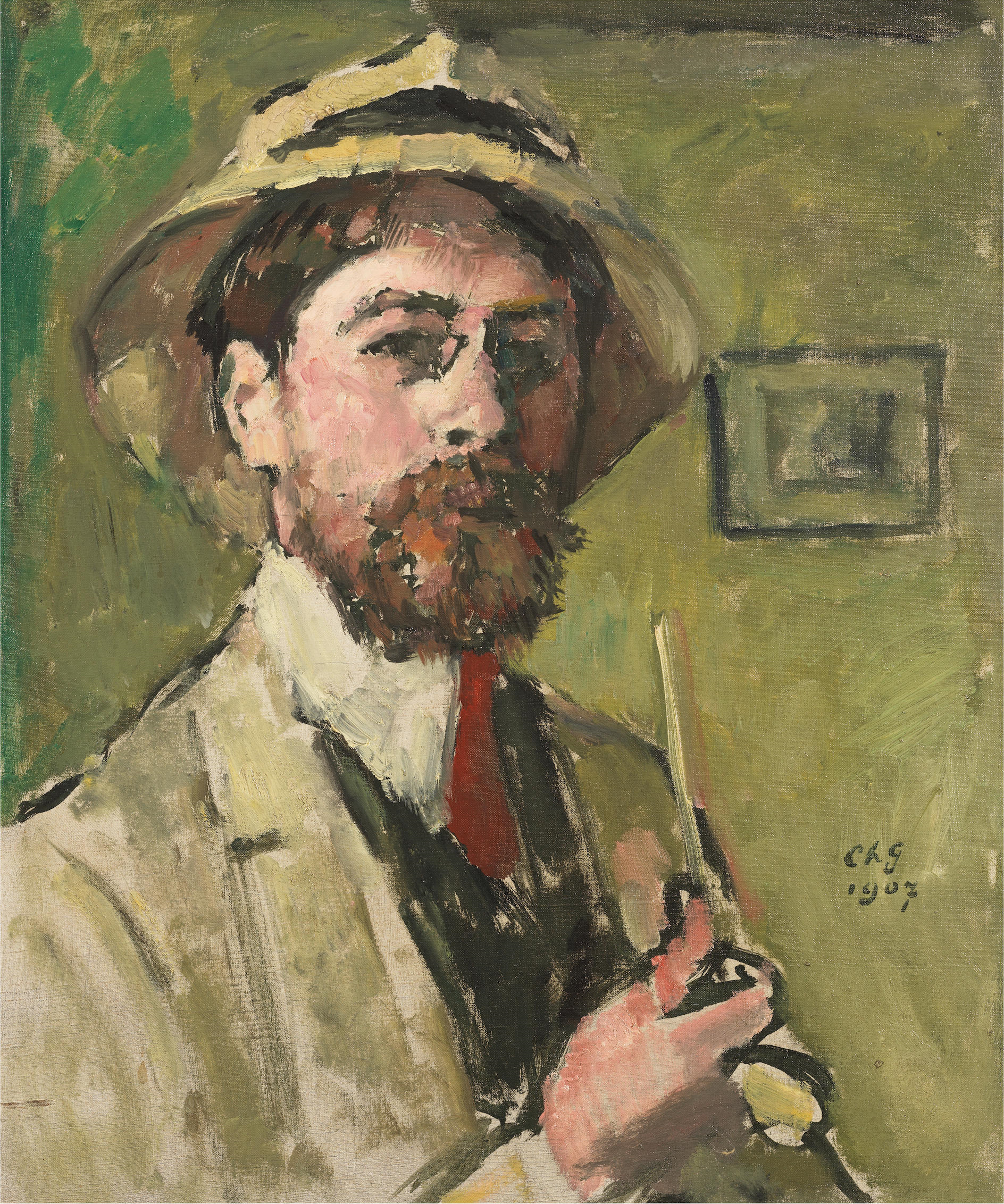
Self Portrait, 1907, of Charles-François-Prosper Guérin

Charles-François-Prosper Guérin (1875 in Sens – 1939) was a French Post-Impressionist painter.

Guérin studied with Gustave Moreau in the l'École des Beaux Arts à Paris, and had one exhibition at the Grafton Galleries in 1910; in a review Huntly Carter wrote of his "daring extravagance" and that he "show[ed] how the strongest primary colours can be used without crudity, and whose work has a decorative value which the average muddy and colourless work of our day does not possess".

Guérin attained some historic notoriety for sitting on the jury of the Salon d'Automne of 1908, which rejected almost all of the paintings of Georges Braque. The other jury members were Henri Matisse, Georges Rouault, and Albert Marquet, all of whom had also been students of Moreau. The jury's action caused Braque—who had been a great success the year before—to withdraw completely from the Salon. Braque subsequently entered into an exclusive contract with the dealer Daniel-Henry Kahnweiler requiring him (and Picasso) to avoid salons, during which time Braque and Picasso developed cubism.

Guérin was teaching at the Académie de La Palette in 1907 when Henri Hayden studied there and at the Académie Moderne in 1913 when Blanche Lazzell enrolled there, as well as at the Académie de la Grande Chaumière. Two works by Guérin, loaned by his dealer and gallerist Eugène Druet, were exhibited in the seminal 1913 Armory Show of Modern Art in New York City.

== Works ==
Some pictures by Guérin

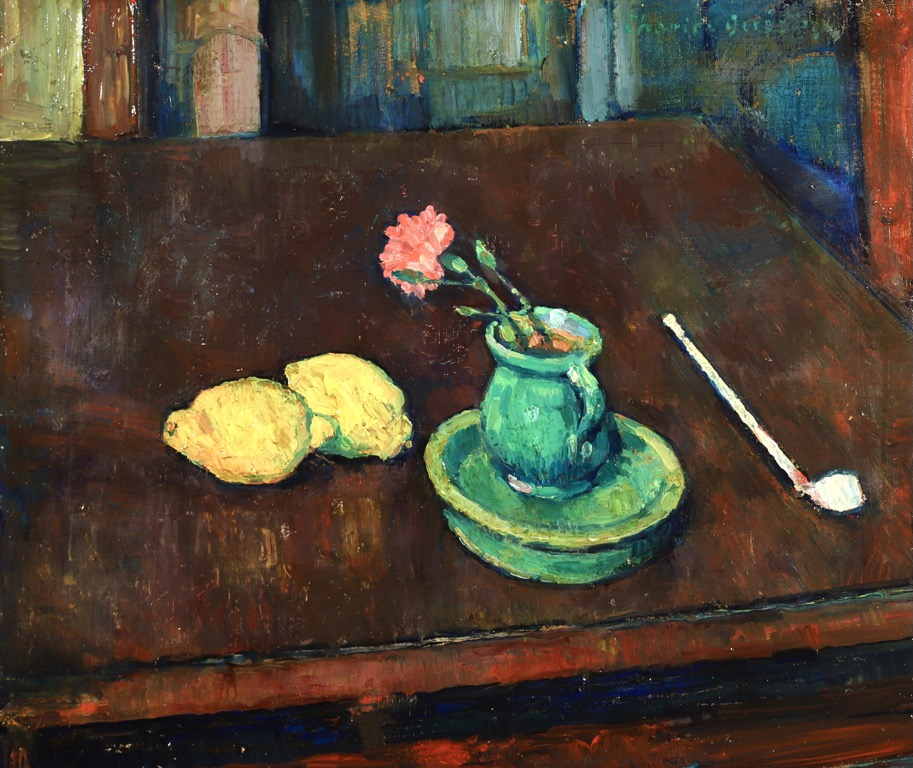
Nature-morte aux deux citrons et à l'oeillet

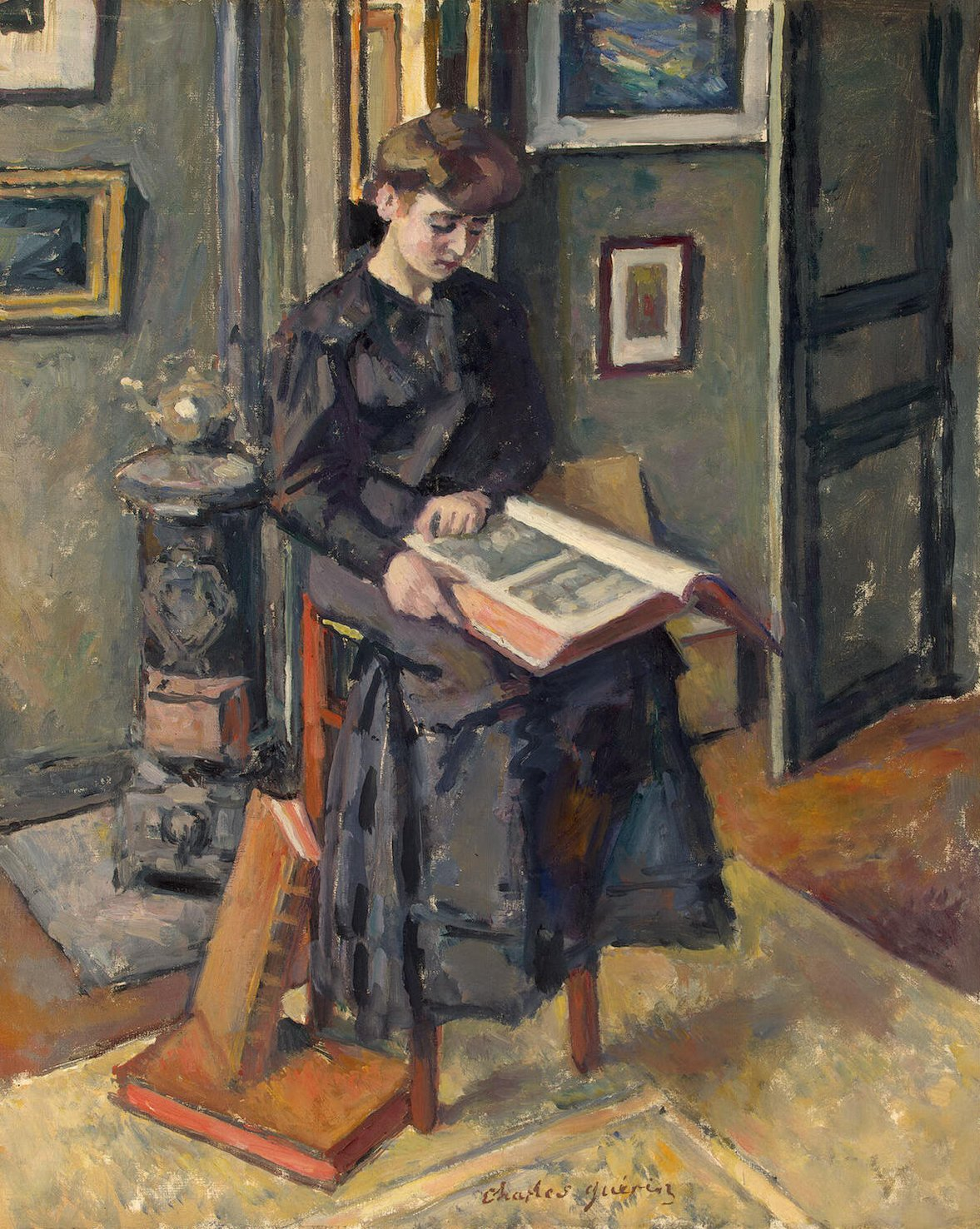
Girl Reading a Book

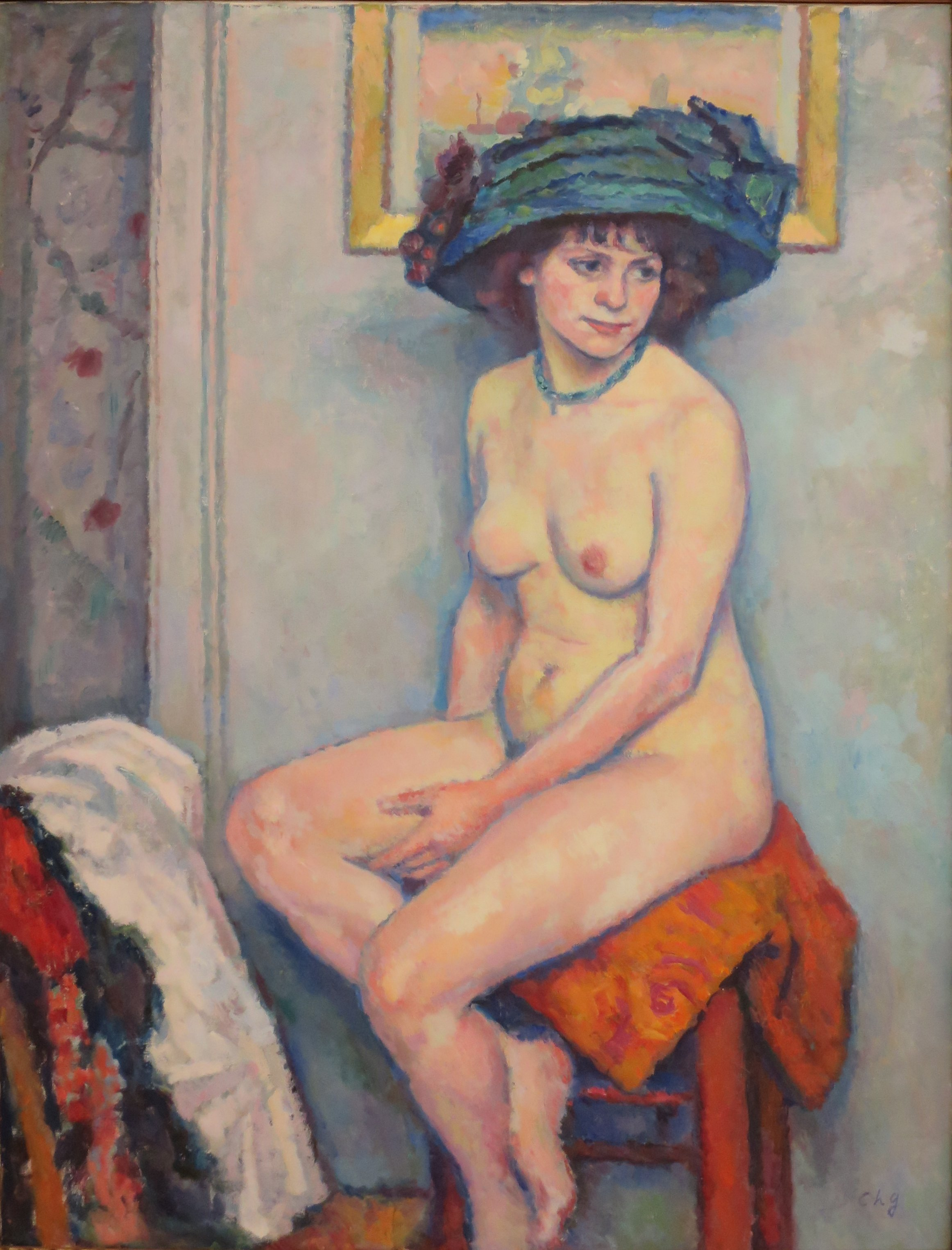
Nude

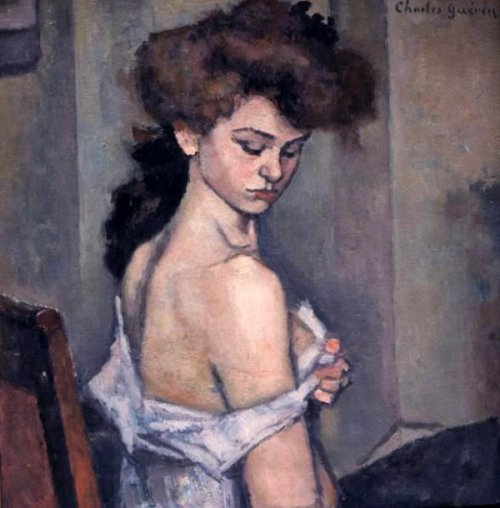
Nude

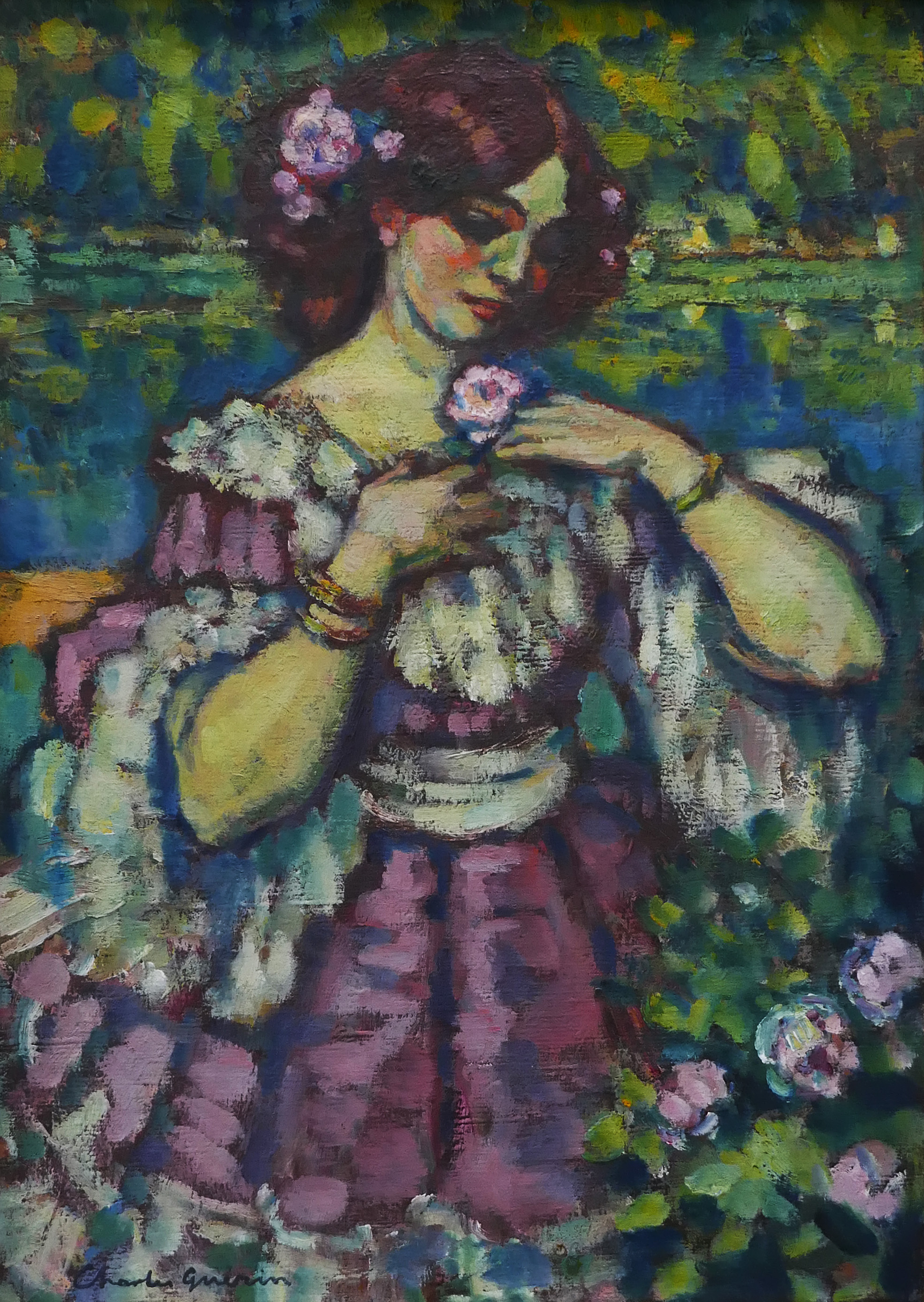
Lady with a Rose

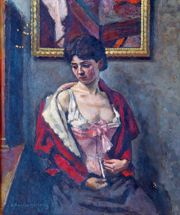
Portrait of a woman

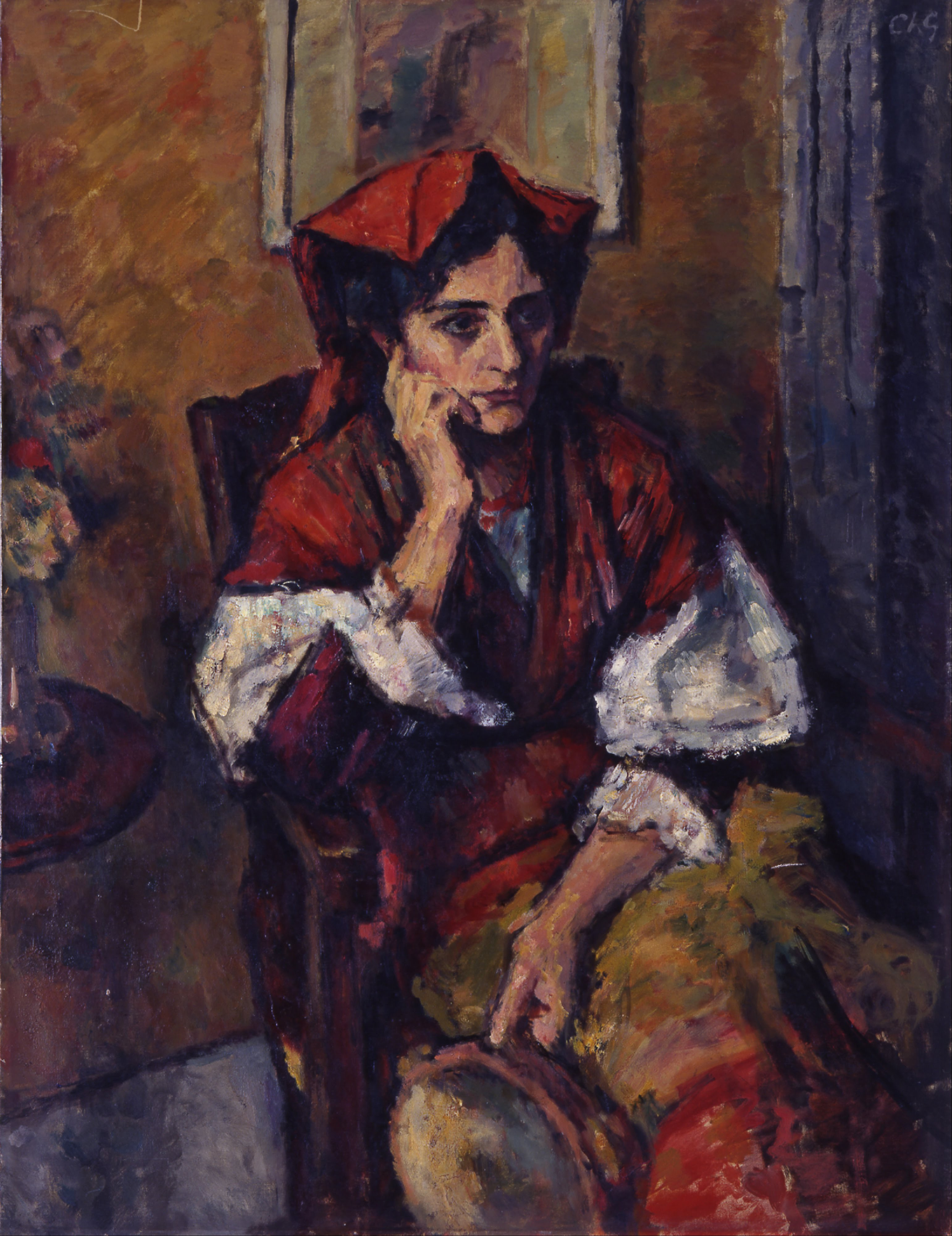
Italian Woman with Tambourine

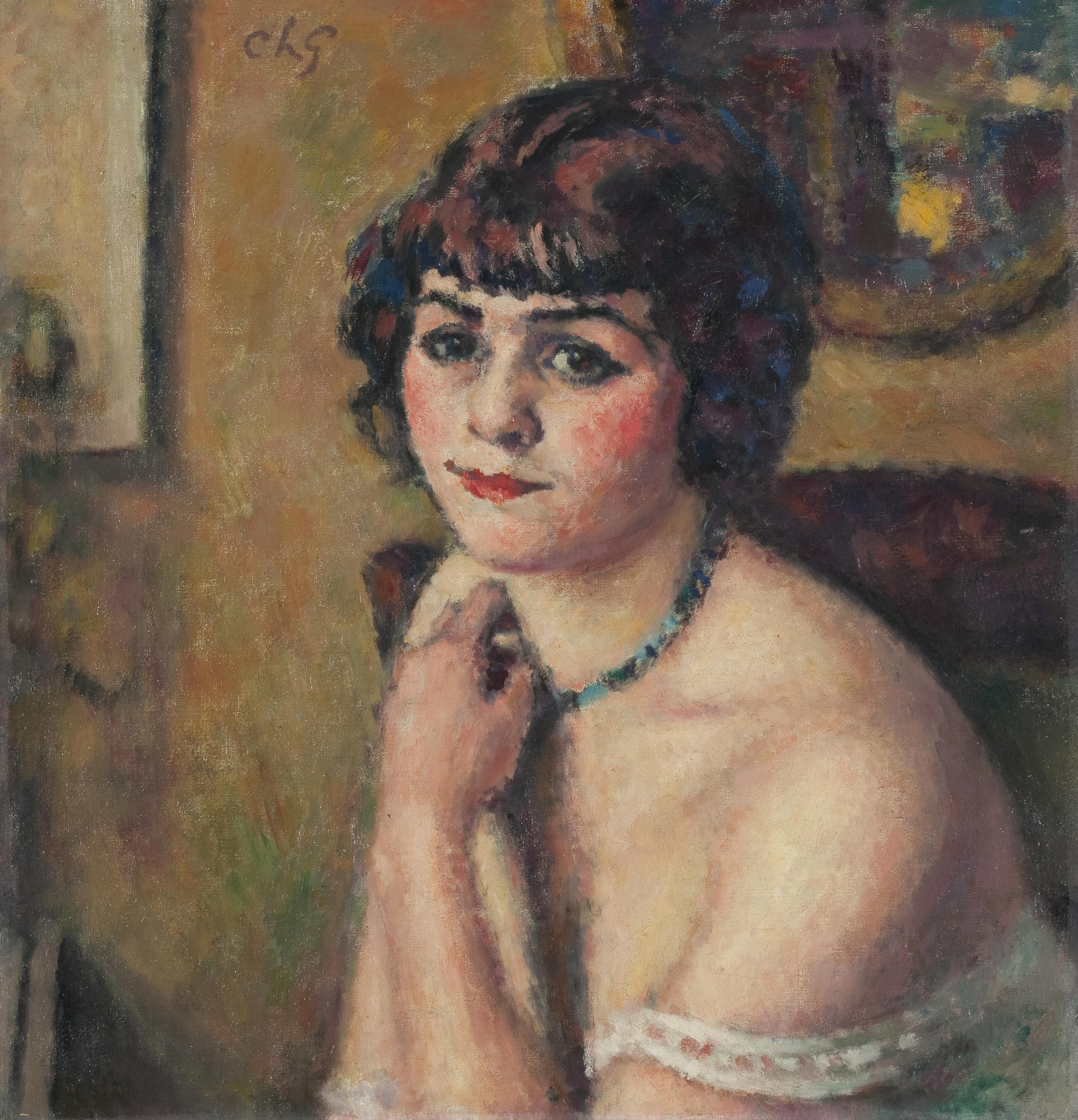
Portrait of a Young Lady

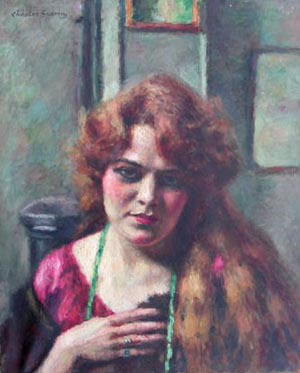
La Femme moderne

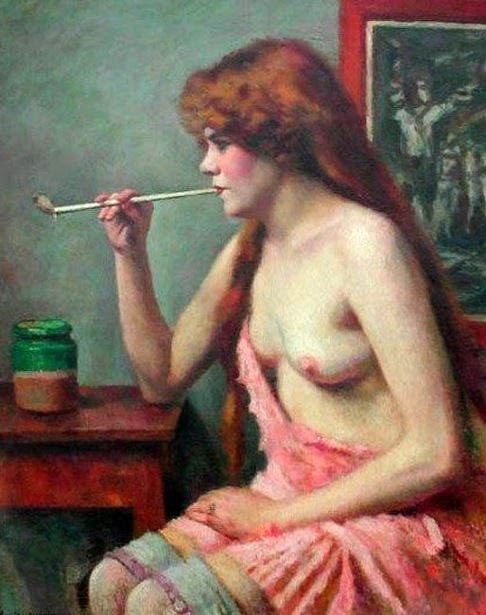
Femme à la Pipe

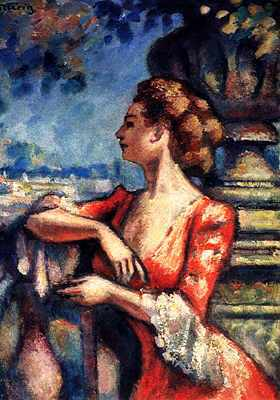
Espérance
