= 1917 Club =

Club for socialists that met in 4 Gerrard Street, Soho

The 1917 Club was a club for socialists that met in 4 Gerrard Street, Soho, in Central London, during the early part of the 20th century. It had been founded in December 1917 by Leonard Woolf and Oliver Strachey. Although its name marked the February Revolution of 1917, it was not a Bolshevik club, and comprised mostly Labour Party members along with some Liberal Party members of the Union of Democratic Control, and some figures from the arts, particularly the Bloomsbury Set.

The club aimed to attract membership from left-wingers who were unable to afford the cost of the gentlemen's clubs in London, or who did not wish to join them for political reasons. It became known for interesting speakers, particularly on political matters, but also for poor quality food.

A small group of Bolshevik supporters around Alfred Bacharach and Miles Malleson met at the club in its early days, but they were greatly outnumbered by other left-wingers. In the afternoon, it was popular with artists and writers, and as the years went on, they came to dominate the club. Still later, it attracted many poorer members who used the club facilities while looking for work. A dispute between two groups of members and a disputed election led the club's committee to close it down in 1932.

Members included V. Gordon Childe, Ramsay MacDonald, Aldous Huxley, H. G. Wells, H. N. Brailsford, Elsa Lanchester, Rose Macaulay, Frederick Pethick-Lawrence, J. A. Hobson, Norah C. James, W. C. Anderson, Leah Manning, Mary Hamilton, Emile Burns, E. D. Morel, Charles Roden Buxton, Clement Attlee, Stanley Unwin, C. E. M. Joad, Herbert Morrison, Hugh Dalton, G. D. H. Cole, E. M. Forster, Oswald Mosley, Raymond Postgate, Shapurji Saklatvala, Ben Turner, Lord Ponsonby, and Huntly Carter.

== See also ==
- Parliamentary Labour Club
