= Parliamentary Labour Club =

The Parliamentary Labour Club, later the National Labour Club, was a club for officials of the British Labour Party. It was founded in 1924.

== History ==
Beatrice Webb had founded the Half Circle Club in 1921, as a social club for the wives of Labour Members of Parliament and trade union leaders. The Labour Party had been previously unsuccessful in establishing any central Labour club, in London; earlier attempts by Arthur Henderson, and Herbert Morrison had failed. Also established by Webb, the Parliamentary Labour Club was opened in May 1924, with donations from Liberal Sir Arthur Acland and wealthy Labour Party members. The Club struggled to attract members; few Labour MPs or trade unionists joined. The Club changed its name to the National Labour Club in 1928. In 1930, Webb wrote about the membership of the Club in her diary, remarking that one could find "short-haired typists from the trade union offices, M.P.s, Cabinet Ministers, all being served in strict order to their coming, and all chatting together indiscriminately".

== Membership ==
The following categories of people were eligible for membership, as long as they were individual members of the Labour Party:

- Labour Members of Parliament
- Endorsed Labour Party candidates
- Members of Labour Advisory Committees
- Members of the Half Circle Club
- Members and staff of the General Council of the Labour Party
- Members and staff of the Labour Party National Executive
- Staff of the Parliamentary Labour Party
- Other salaried staff of the Labour Party
- Salaried officials of trade unions
- Salaried officials of organisations affiliated to the Labour Party
- Labour aldermen and councillors on local authorities
- Presidents, chairmen and secretaries of divisional and local Labour parties
- Secretaries of trades councils
- Presidents and secretaries of Labour party women's sections
- Spouses, children and siblings of any of the above

People who had rendered distinguished service to the Labour Party could also be elected to membership.

The club had premises at 11 Tufton Street, London.

== See also ==
- 1917 Club
