= École intuit.lab =

French institution of strategy, design and digital

École Intuit Lab
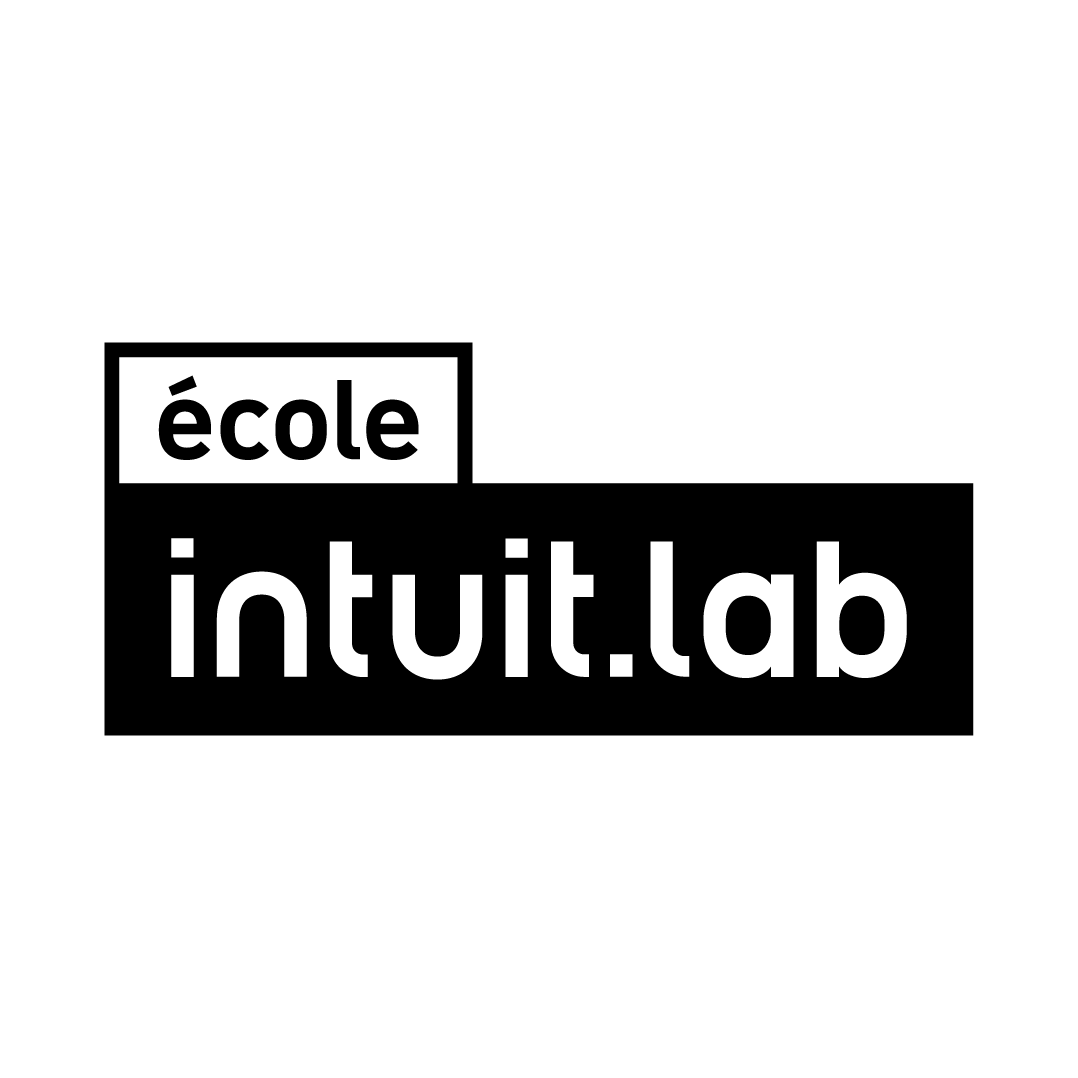
- Established: 2001
- Affiliations: European Credit Transfer and Accumulation System
- President: Frédéric Lalande & Clément Derock
- Principal: Yan Garin
- Dean: Meike Kraus
- Location: Paris, Mumbai, Marseille, Kolkata, São Paulo
- Website: https://www.ecole-intuit-lab.com/

École Intuit Lab is a French design and visual communication school cofounded in 2001 by Patrick Felices along with Clement Derock and Frederic Lalande. In 2006, following the success of the initial venture, a second school was opened in Aix-en-Provence, the land where famous artists such as Picasso, Van Gogh and Cézanne lived.

== Meaning of the name ==
The name of the institute has been derived from two words, intuition and laboratory. Intuition is the ability to foresee and to immediately perceive the truth without conscious reasoning. Laboratory is any place where a team works on the elaboration of a discovery, creation or a research project. Hence, the name means a living laboratory of reflection and the production of creative solutions.

== Aim ==
The aim of the school has been to produce high quality professionals whose profiles meet the specific needs of the graphic design and visual communication sectors in India, France and across the world. With the newly begun school in India, the syllabus has been especially skewed to meet the professional demands of the visual communications industry in India and to tap the potential that design holds in the country. école intuit.lab through its students have built solid relationships with over 800 companies in France and other countries.

With a consistently expanding list of firsts (the first school to introduce new subjects in design in the 1980s, the first to truly promote international collaborations, the first to regularly engage in mixed media design), école intuit.lab has led the way in design education. Today école intuit.lab is one of the top best design schools in Paris. And for the first time has brought itself to the doorstep of students outside of Europe, best place to be in Asia, to Mumbai, India.

== History ==
In the year 2000, after rather long stints in Parisian design companies, Clément Derock and Frédéric Lalande got together to create a design company that was the first of its kind in France. It combined separate skill sets – new Internet-related technology, mixed media branding and traditional design skills – to create a new agency called "Seenk". Based on the belief that métissage or crossbreeding is crucial to the evolution of species, Seenk adopted mixed media as a part of each of their branding or communication exercise at a time when no other company was doing so.

Afterwards, Clément and Fréderic tied up with Patrick Felices, an experienced graphic design educator, to found École Intuit. Patrick had been the Dean of a noted Paris based design school for many years before he took on the mantle of co-founder and Dean at école intuit.lab to 2018. Clement and Frédéric remain in charge of the school and these campuses.

In 2008 the Paris school moved to an entirely new building that is located close to the Eiffel Tower.

In 2010, the institute opened its first international branch in Mumbai - one of the fastest-growing cities in Asia. Taking forward the idea and practice of 'business application in design education.

In 2020, a new campus of École Intuit Lab was created in Kolkata.

In 2021 the campus of Aix-en-Provence moved to Marseille in Euromed area. In the same year 2021, the École opened a new campus in São Paulo, Brazil.

In December 2023, the Colors Art Institute was opened in Dubai, providing the École's classes in the city.

== ECTS ==
The institute is a part of European Credit Transfer and Accumulation System, a standard for comparing the study attainment and performance of students of higher education across the European Union and other collaborating European countries.

== Courses ==
=== Four Year Course in Graphic Design ===
The four-year course in Graphic Design is open to students after standard X or XII This consists of a one-year fundamental course, followed by 3 years of advanced-level studies.

=== Master's in Graphic Design ===
Master's programme is available for students who have completed 4 years in Design. The programme is exclusively available in the Paris campus and is the last stage in the curriculum. It finalises the initial Bac+4-level training with a specialisation year in the areas of Graphic Design, Creative advertising and Multimedia/Animation.

=== Post Graduation in Advertising, Design & Digital Communication ===
The one year Post Graduation in Advertising, Design & Digital Communication aims to provides students with an in-depth understanding of advertising, branding, design, digital and communication strategies.

== Ranking ==
For years, The school has been in the top 5 in Ecoles de Art Director & Design (Bac+5)
