= Musée du Montparnasse =

Defunct museum in Paris, France

Coordinates: 48°50′36.3″N 2°19′15″E

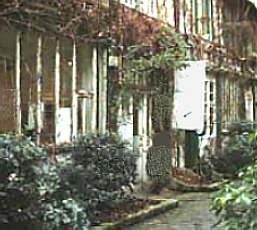
Musée du Montparnasse, in Paris, opened in the former studio of painter, Marie Vassilieff

The Musée du Montparnasse was a museum at 21 Avenue du Maine, in the 15th arrondissement, Montparnasse Quarter of Paris, France. The museum closed in 2015.

== Background ==
The museum opened its doors on 28 May 1998. Located at the former site of the early-1900s atelier of the Russian painter, Marie Vassilieff, the museum was founded by Roger Pic and Jean-Marie Drot as a nonprofit operation.

The museum provided visitors with a history of the multitude of artists who came from around the world to live and work in Montparnasse at the beginning of the twentieth century, plus the museum put on temporary exhibitions of works by Montparnasse artists, both past and present.

For years, both before and during World War I, Marie Vassilieff also operated what was registered as a private club that acted as a canteen for artists where food and drink were provided as cheaply as possible to struggling painters such as, Amedeo Modigliani, Chaïm Soutine, Pablo Picasso, and others.

Before long it became the gathering place for many others in the area and, by 1913, Vassilieff's canteen was so widely known that painter, sculptor, and filmmaker, Fernand Léger, gave two lectures there on the topic of Modern art.

As part of a membership program, the Musée du Montparnasse offered a once-a-month evening meeting where members gathered to enjoy a variety of cultural events.

== See also ==
- List of museums in Paris
