= Huntly Carter =

British journalist and arts critic (c. 1862–1942)

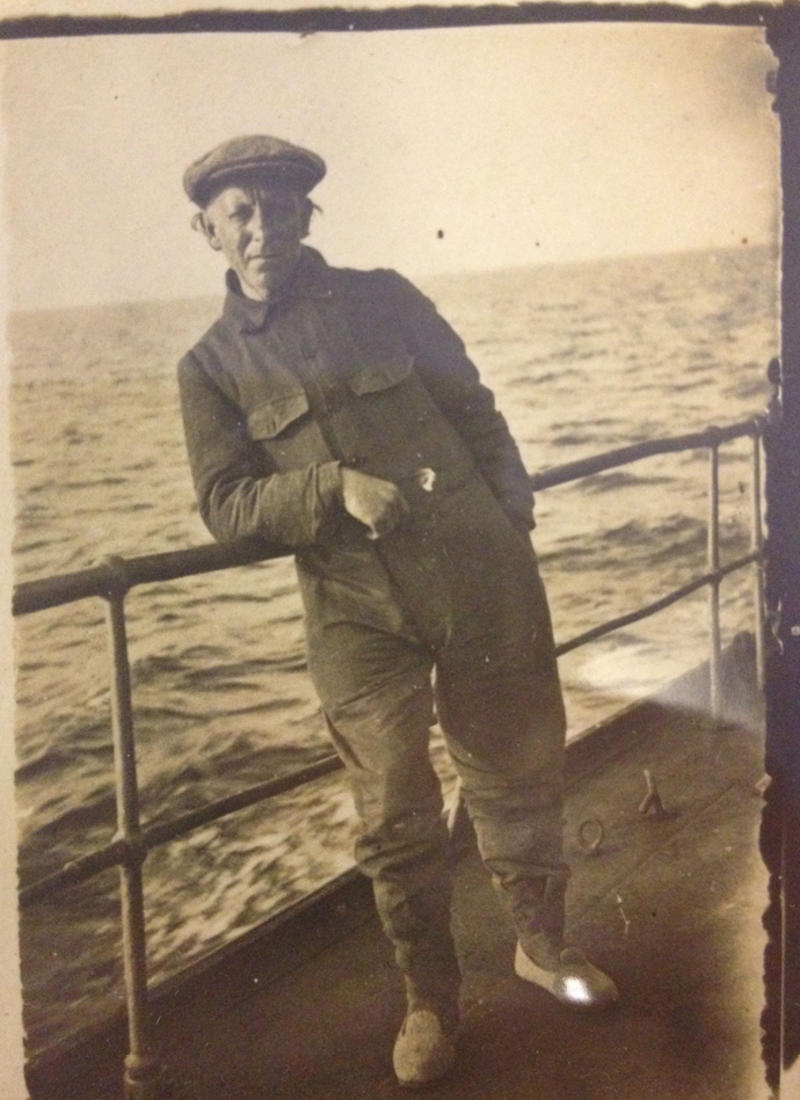
- Carter aboard ship, circa 1920
- Born: 1862?
- Died: 1942
- Occupation: writer
- Language: English
- Literary movement: Modernism
- Notable works: The Theatre of Max Reinhardt, The New Theatre and Cinema of Soviet Russia

Huntly Carter (1862? - 29 March 1942) was a British journalist, art critic, and lecturer. He is known as one of the earliest writers to introduce Soviet avant-garde theatre to British audiences.

== Life ==
Carter was born in 1861 or 1862. By the 1910s he was established in London as a journalist and arts critic. He contributed to the modernist periodical The New Age, edited by A. R. Orage, where he wrote the "Art and Drama" column and served as international editor. He also wrote for The Egoist. He engaged with Cubism, the visual arts of the Camden Town Group, and emerging avant-garde movements across Europe.

Carter was a member of the 1917 Club, alongside Aldous Huxley and many others associated with progressive politics and the arts.

Carter traveled extensively in the Soviet Union in the 1920s and 1930s. He met many celebrated figures in Soviet cultural life, including Vsevolod Meyerhold, Vladimir Mayakovsky, Konstantin Stanislavsky, Alexander Rodchenko, and Sergei Eisenstein. He published articles in Soviet periodicals including Izvestia, Vecherniaia Moskva, and Zhizn' iskusstva, and he regularly participated in cultural exchange programs between the Soviet Union and Great Britain. He was a founding member of the Workers' Theatre Movement in the 1920s, which sought to adapt Soviet theatrical techniques for British working-class audiences. Carter documented his travels in photographs now held at the University of Notre Dame. He also edited a series of volumes on political and social reform in England.

Carter died in London in 1942. According to a New York Times report, London authorities discovered his body in a vacant building. The circumstances of his death remain unclear.

== Work and legacy ==
Carter's books provided English-reading audiences with detailed, first-hand accounts of the theatrical experiments taking place in Moscow and Petrograd, including productions of Meyerhold's Theatre of Revolution, the Proletkult theaters, club theaters, open-air mass spectacles, and emerging Soviet cinema. He organized Soviet theatrical material into thematic treatments, distinguishing between political tendencies within Soviet theatre.

His work on European theater, particularly his study of Max Reinhardt, established him as an expert on the transformations that war and revolution had on theatrical form across the continent.

Despite the scale of his output and the importance of his subject matter, Carter fell into obscurity relatively quickly after his death. In recent years, scholars at the University of Oxford and elsewhere have drawn renewed attention to his work. A workshop performance titled The Revival of Huntly Carter, produced by Menagerie Theatre Company in collaboration with TORCH (The Oxford Research Centre in the Humanities), explored why a writer of his reach had been so thoroughly forgotten.

== Selected publications ==
- The New Spirit in Drama & Art" - (1912) - Editorial Frank Palmer, Londres.
- The Theatre of Max Reinhardt (1914)
- The New Spirit in the European Theatre, 1914-1924: A Comparative Study of the Changes Effected by the War and Revolution (1925)
- The New Theatre and Cinema of Soviet Russia (International Publishers, 1925)

== Archives ==
Carter's personal papers and research materials are held in two principal repositories: The Huntly Carter Papers at the University of Notre Dame, and The Huntly Carter Collection of the Society for Co-Operation in Russian and Soviet Studies in London.
