= Imre Szobotka =

Hungarian painter

Imre, Szobotka
- Born: 3 September 1890; Zalaegerszeg, Hungary
- Died: 3 May 1961 (aged 70); Budapest, Hungary
- Known for: Painting, Engraving

Szobotka Imre (Zalaegerszeg, 1890 September 3 - Budapest, 1961 May 24) was a Hungarian painter.
