= Girardon =

Girardon is a French surname that may refer to

- Catherine Duchemin (later Girardon, 1630–1698), French flower and fruit painter, wife of François Girardon
- François Girardon (1628–1715), French sculptor
- Michèle Girardon (1938–1975), French actress
