= Marie Vassilieff =

Russian painter (1884–1957)

- Born: February 12, 1884; Smolensk, Russia
- Died: May 14, 1957 (aged 73); Nogent-sur-Marne, France
- Other name: Mariya Ivanovna Vassiliéva
- Movement: Cubism

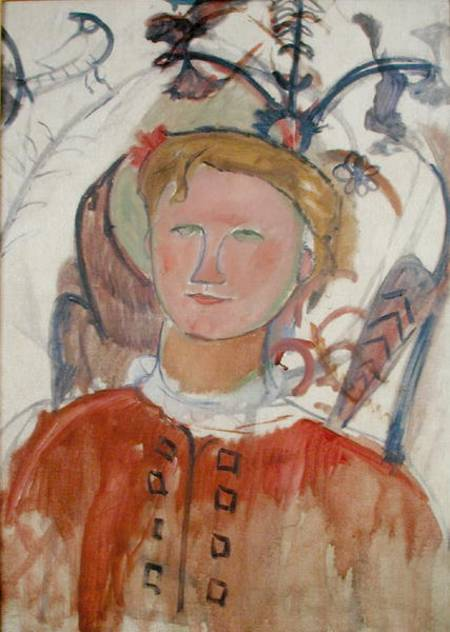
Marie Vassilieff (c. 1918) in a portrait by Amedeo Modigliani

Mariya Ivanovna Vassilieva (Russian: Мария Ивановна Васильева; 1884-1957), gallicised and known in Western sources as Marie Vassilieff, was a Russian-born painter and set designer active in Paris.

She was born on February 12, 1884 in Smolensk, Russia. She attended the Saint Petersburg Academy of Arts. She also studied at the École des Beaux-Arts in Paris, where she was taught by Henri Matisse.

In 1910 she co-founded the Academie Russe in Paris. Several years later she left that school and founded Academie Vassilieff also in Paris. Academie Vassilieff located in the 15th arrondissement of Paris (Montparnasse), became a popular place, and during World War I Vassilieff turned the property into a canteen (cafeteria) serving inexpensive meals to artist in the neighborhood.

Vassilieff died on May 14, 1957 in Nogent-sur-Marne, France.

Her property, Villa Vassilieff, at 21 Avenue du Maine has served as a gallery, a museum (Musée du Montparnasse), and study center.
