= List of Russian women artists =

This is a list of women artists who were born in Russia or whose artworks are closely associated with that country.

== A ==
- Taisia Afonina (1913–1994), painter
- Sara Alexandri (born 1913), painter
- Anna Andreeva (1917–2009), textile artist
- Evgenia Antipova (1917–2009), portrait, genre, and still life painter
- Tatyana Apraksina (born 1963), graphic artist, illustrator, writer
- Evgenia Arbugaeva (born 1985), phtographer
- Mariam Aslamazian (1907–2006), painter
- Irina Azizyan (1935–2009), painter

== B ==
- Irina Baldina (1922–2009), painter
- Varvara Baruzdina (1862–1941), painter
- Maria Bashkirtseva (1858–1884), painter
- Evgenia Baykova (1907–1997), realist painter, graphic artist
- Aleksandra Belcova (1892–1981), Latvian/Russian painter
- Olga Beggrow-Hartmann (1862–1922), German/Russian, painter
- Angelina Beloff (1879–1969), Russian-born painter, moved to Mexico
- Zlata Bizova (1927–2013), painter
- Seraphima Blonskaya (1870–1947), painter, art teacher
- Elisabeth Boehm (1843–1914), painter, postcard designer
- Olga Bogaevskaya (1915–2000), painter
- Kseniya Boguslavskaya (1892–1972), avant-garde painter, poet, decorator
- Vita Buivid (born 1962), contemporary artist

== C ==
- Anastasia Chernyavsky, photographer
- Olga and Galina Chichagova (1886–1958 and 1891–1966), children's book illustrators

== D ==
- Olga Della-Vos-Kardovskaya (1875–1952), painter
- Alexandra Dementieva (born 1960), digital artist
- Irina Dobrekova (born 1931), painter
- Olya Dubatova, painter, installation artist

== E ==
- Aleksandra Ekster (1882–1949), Russia-French painter, designer
- Vera Ermolaeva (1893–1937), avant-garde painter, illustrator

== G ==
- Nina Genke-Meller (1893–1954), Ukrainian-Russian avant-garde artist, designer, scenographer
- Helen Gerardia (1903–1988), Russian-born American painter
- Irina Getmanskaya (born 1939), painter, educator
- Natalia Gippius (1905–1994), painter
- Natalia Goncharova (1881–1962), avant-garde painter, costume designer, writer
- Tatiana Gorb (1935–2013), painter, illustrator, educator
- Elena Gorokhova (1935–2014), painter
- Elena Guro (1877–1913), futurist painter

== K ==
- Svetlana K-Lie (born 1977), multidisciplinary artist based in the UK
- Anastasia Khoroshilova (born 1978), artist, photographer
- Maria Kleschar-Samokhvalova (1915–2000), painter
- Elena Nikandrovna Klokacheva (1871–c.1943), painter
- Maya Kopitseva (1924–2005), still life painter
- Tatiana Kopnina (1921–2009), painter, art teacher
- Elena Kostenko (1926–2019), painter
- Anna Kostrova (1909–1994), realist painter, illustrator
- Maya Dmitrievna Koveshnikova (1926–2013), Siberian landscape and still life painter
- Marina Kozlovskaya (1925–2019), painter
- Sophia Ivanovna Kramskaya (1866–1933), painter

== L ==
- Valeria Larina (1926–2008), painter
- Anna Leporskaya (1900–1982), painter
- Irina Levshakova (1959–2016), painter

== M ==
- Tatyana Mavrina (1900–1996), artist and children's book illustrator
- Valentina Monakhova (born 1932), painter, art teacher
- Liza Morozova (born 1973), contemporary artist, psychologist, writer
- Vera Mukhina (1889–1953), sculptor, social realist

== N ==
- Irina Nakhova (born 1955), painter, educator
- Ida Nappelbaum (1900–1992), writer, photographer
- Vera Nazina (born 1931), painter
- Ry Nikonova (1942–2014), painter, writer

== O ==
- Ry Nikonova (1871–1955), watercolourist, woodcut artist

== P ==
- Anna Parkina (born 1979), visual artist
- Liubov Popova (1889–1924), cubist abstractionist painter

== R ==
- Lubov Rabinovich (1907–2001), painter
- Teresa Feoderovna Ries (1874–1950), painter
- Vera Rockline (1896–1934), painter
- Olga Rozanova (1886–1918), avant-garde painter
- Maria Rudnitskaya (1916–1983), painter, art teacher
- Galina Rumiantseva (1927–2004), painter
- Nadya Rusheva (1952–1969), illustrator
- Anastasia Ryabova (born 1985), contemporary artist
- Marina Ryndzyunskaya (1877–1946), sculptor

== S ==
- Aidan Salahova (born 1964), contemporary artist
- Zinaida Serebriakova (1884–1967), painter, social realist
- Daria Serenko, (born 1993), curator and artist activist
- Nadezhda Shteinmiller (1915–1991), painter, art teacher
- Elena Skuin (1908–1986), Latvian-Russian painter, art teacher
- Esphyr Slobodkina (1908–2002), illustrator, writer
- Galina Smirnova (1929–2015), painter
- Varvara Stepanova (1884–1958), Constructivist artist

== U ==
- Nadezhda Udaltsova (1885–1961), avant-garde painter, art teacher

== V ==
- Nina Tokhtaman Valetova (born 1958), metaphysical realism, fantasy and visionary painter
- Nina Veselova (1922–1960), painter
- Elena Volkova (1915–2013), painter
- Olga Volchkova (born 1970), painter, curator
- Ekaterina Vorona (born 1975), sculptor and graphic artist
- Eugenia Vronskaya (born 1966), painter

== W ==
- Marianne von Werefkin (1860–1938), avant-garde expressionist painter

== Y ==
- Josephinne Yaroshevich (born 1946), painter

== Z ==
- Olga Zhekulina (1900–1973), painter, puppeteer
- Maria Zubreeva (1900–1991), painter, designer
