= Aleksey Borisovich Silayev =

Russian/Soviet biochemist

Aleksey Borisovich Silaev
- Born: 26 March 1906; Alexandrovka, Novosilsky District, Oryol oblast
- Died: 28 September 1989 (83 years); Moscow, USSR
- Citizenship: USSR
- Education: Moscow State Pedagogical University Moscow State University (PhD)
- Awards: Order of the Badge of Honour Medal "For Valiant Labour in the Great Patriotic War 1941–1945" Medal "In Commemoration of the 800th Anniversary of Moscow" Honoured Scientist of the RSFSR (1976)
- Scientific career
- Fields: rganic chemistry, research of antibiotics and anti-cancer drugs
- Workplaces: MSU Faculty of Chemistry, MSU Faculty of Biology, MSU Faculty of Geology
- Thesis: Study of diketopiperazines as fragments of a protein molecule (1937)
- Doctoral advisor: Nikolay Zelinsky

Alekséy Borisovich Siláyev (26 March [8 April] 1906, Alexandrovka, Nosovilsky District – 28 September 1989, Moscow, USSR) was a Soviet chemist. He was a Professor of the Faculty of Chemistry and the Faculty of Biology at Moscow State University. Honoured Scientist of the RSFSR (1976).

Silaev was a specialist in the field of natural compounds, his main scientific works were devoted to the chemistry of antibiotics and anti-cancer drugs. He was a student of Nikolai Dmitriyevich Zelinsky.

== Biography ==
=== Childhood ===
Aleksey Silaev was born on 26 March 1906 (by Julian calendar; 8 April by Gregorian calendar) in the village of Aleksandrovka, Novosilsky District, Oryol region (formerly Tula Governorate). He was the tenth child in the family of Boris Matveevich Silaev, a village horse fitter, and his wife Evdokia Andreevna. 15 children were born in the family in total, 7 of them died./

In the fall of 1914 at the age of 8, Aleksey went to school, but soon fell ill and stopped attending classes. In the fall of 1915, he was hospitalized in Novosil with a diagnosis of "bone tuberculosis of the hip". He was severely ill, in total he was under treatment for about 3 years and remained limp afterward. In the hospital, wounded soldiers taught him reading, writing and arithmetic, and he also studied himself using school textbooks. In this way, Aleksey went through the program for II-IV grades of elementary school.

=== Youth ===
For the next six years Silaev studied and lived in the "Blue School", staying overnight in the school classroom. Having studied for two years in the secondary school, in the fall of 1923 he transferred to the Pedagogical Technical School in Novosil. In June 1926 Aleksey received the Diploma of the People's Teacher and in the same summer he went to Moscow to enroll the Institute.

=== Student years ===
In 1926 Silaev was enrolled in the Defectology Department of the Pedagogical Institute named after V. Lenin (former 2nd Moscow State University), but Aleksey showed great interest in natural sciences. He attended classes of two departments at once after he agreed upon attending inorganic chemistry practical classes with a laboratory assistant. In the winter session he passed all the subjects in the Defectology and Natural Departments with "excellent" grades, and after a personal conversation with Professor A. N. Reformatorsky he was transferred to the Natural Department.

=== Family establishment ===
In May 1932 Silaev met with his future wife, Lydia Alekseevna Filippova. They were married on 15 August 1933, in Bronnitsy, and rented a room in Moscow. In the spring of 1934, the couple was already expecting a child, so they moved into an apartment at the Institute of Rabbit Breeding. In May, Lydia gave birth to a son they named Nikolai.

In the summer of 1938, Nikolai died due to dysentery and subsequent toxic sepsis in Botkin Hospital. In the summer of 1939, a second child, a daughter named Svetlana, was born.

=== Wartime ===
Silaev's wife Lidia and their daughter Sveta were evacuated to Kazan on 21 July 1941, along with other women of Moscow University and their kids.

The girl fell ill with dysentery on the way and was admitted to a children's hospital in Kazan. The prognosis was believed to be unpromising, but thanks to sulfapyridine (an antibiotic from VIEM Institute, which was experimental at the time), Sveta managed to survive.

In the northern fall of 1941 the University began to prepare for evacuation. At the end of October, Aleksey came to Kazan to his family. After arrival, he began to help, sending mothers with their children to Ashgabat. On 27 November 1941, they left Kazan and headed for Ashgabat via Tashkent. Upon arrival, the Silaev family together with the families of other faculty members were placed in the gym of the local school. In Ashgabat, the faculty worked in the building of Pedagogical Institute, three laboratories were organized, and 22 works were done during the whole time of stay. Silaev studied the possibility of synthetic rubber devulcanization and transfer into a soluble state. Also, he developed new types of detergents based on bentonites and saponins.

In the northern summer ov 1942 preparations for re-evacuation began, and on 15 August the University left for Sverdlovsk. As a result of the abrupt change of climate, Sveta fell ill with malaria. This time, she was saved by quinine. On 6 March 1943, a third child, a son named Sasha was born in the family, and on 5 May, the Silaev and his family returned to Moscow together with the rest of the University staff.

Upon his return to Moscow Silaev was appointed head of the first department of MSU, and in 1945 he was appointed assistant vice-rector for scientific work and head of the scientific department. In October 1945, a son named Dima was born.

== Scientific work ==
During his life, Aleksey Silaev published about 400 scientific papers, including three monographs, and had 32 certificates of authorship.

=== Before the wartime ===
==== Postgraduate study ====
In 1930 Silaev graduated from the Pedagogical Institute and was sent to MSU (which was named Moscow University at the time) for postgraduate studies. There he was assigned to the Department of Organic Chemistry of the MSU Faculty of Chemistry and from 1930 to 1933 he was a postgraduate student of N. D. Zelinsky and N. I. Gavrilov. He had the task of determining the loss of amine nitrogen during autoclave hydrolysis of proteins.

==== PhD thesis, work with N. D. Zelinsky ====
In 1937 Aleksey Silaev defended his PhD thesis on "Study of diketopiperazines as fragments of protein molecules". The scientist conducted experiments on autoclave hydrolysis of proteins in the presence of 2% solutions of sulfuric and hydrochloric acids, phosphoric, acetic and oxalic acids' solutions at concentration of up to 40% when heated to 110–180 °C in an autoclave for the duration of 5 to 10 hours. As a result, it was found that there is a process of deamination of amino acids and peptides formed during hydrolysis (the amount of amine nitrogen decreases as much as ammonia nitrogen is added). These results refuted the diketopiperazine theory of protein structure suggested by Zelinsky and N. I. Gavrilov.

After defending his thesis and until the beginning of the war, under the direction of Nikolai Nasonov, Silaev studied the chemical nature of substances that stimulate growth and shape formation. During his work, he managed to obtain cartilage hydrolysates with 2% hydrochloric acid at room temperature. Hydrolysates contained 47% of amine nitrogen and showed the highest activity.

=== After the wartime ===
==== Antibiotics laboratory ====
In September 1950, at the request of Academician Nikolai Zelinsky, the Laboratory of Antibiotics was established on the basis of the Laboratory of Protein Chemistry. After the death of Zelinsky in July 1953, Silaev had to transfer to the Faculty of Biology.

In November 1953, by the rector's order, Silaev was appointed Head of the Laboratory of Antibiotics of the Biological and Chemical Faculties. He was the head of the laboratory until 1980. Scientific work in the laboratory began in the summer of 1954, in 1959 a pilot plant for biosynthesis, isolation and purification of antibiotics.

The laboratory dealt with various problems: from the search for antibiotic producers to the establishment of their chemical structure and mechanisms of action. The main activity of the laboratory was to study the relationship between the composition, structure, functional properties of the antibiotic molecules and the spectrum of their biological activity.

Silaev participated in determination of the chemical structures of protamines from sturgeon fish gonads and numerous antibiotics, including polymyxin M, neotelomycin (antibiotics A-128-P and A-128-OP), ristomycin A, aurantin.

In 1963, Silaev defended his doctoral thesis.

A number of Silaev's studies were focused on the improvement of already existing antibiotics. In this regard, an extensive series of works on chemical and biological modification of such antibiotics as gramicidin S, polymyxin M, neotelomycin, actinomycin was emerged. These studies helped to understand the role of individual blocks of antibiotic molecules or their functional groups in the display of biological activity, and also the reasons for the loss of biological activity.

Besides, Silaev took part in development of methods for studying the antibiotics' and their derivatives' mechanism of action. It was shown that an antibiotic substance in its composition and structure must necessarily have elements of structure that are not peculiar to substances of normal metabolism. In these studies was established the dependence between the number of abnormal fragments contained in the antibiotic, the antibiotic resistance to enzymes of normal metabolism and the selectivity of the drug action (inhibitory effect) – the more abnormality fragments contain in the structure, the greater its resistance and selectivity.

In addition Silaev was engaged in the development of regulations for the production of antibiotics and organization of clinical trials. Under his supervision, numerous producers of various chemical classes of antibiotics were isolated. The study of the producers' biology and the conditions of antibiotic biosynthesis, methods of isolation and purification led to the creation of laboratory-production regulations for the production of gramicidin S (deep cultivation), nisin, trichothecin, actinomycins, nonactin, and their partial introduction into industry. Many antibiotics obtained in the laboratory have undergone clinical trials. Moreover, the possibilities of application of some antibiotics in crop production and livestock farming were studied.

==== Working in the oncology field ====
In 1965 Silaev became one of the organizers of the interfaculty commission for coordination of research on oncological diseases at the Academic Council of Natural Faculties of MSU. Under his leadership, a plan for the comprehensive study of malignant tumors was created and more than 100 meetings and scientific seminars on oncology were held. Aleksey was the chief editor of the 7-volume edition of the collections "Actual Problems of Modern Oncology".

Silaev conducted research in the field of antitumor drugs: actinomycin, protamine, protozoan drugs (astasilide, astasian). Some of these drugs have passed clinical trials. In addition, scientists at that time were faced with the task of searching for drugs that normalized metabolism in the body and prevented the appearance of metastases.

==== Other areas of the scientific work ====
Silaev was engaged in research in the field of sulfur-containing organic compounds. Works on the synthesis of mercapto compounds as radio-protectors were carried out. In addition, he participated in research on the creation of xenografts – substitutes for blood vessels and valves with specified (anticoagulant, antithrombotic and antiseptic) properties for use in medical practice.

== Teaching activity ==
In 1932, in the second year of postgraduate study, Silaev underwent pedagogical practice under the supervision of Professor M.I. Ushakov and began to teach practical classes in organic chemistry at the Biological and Chemical Faculties. In the same year, he was invited to the Department of Chemistry of the University named after Y.M. Sverdlov. For 6 years he taught classes at this university under the guidance of A. A. Samoilov. Since 1935 he gave a course of lectures for the Geology Department of Moscow University. In 1940, he received the title of docent. During the evacuation of the Moscow University to Ashgabat he gave three courses: organic chemistry, antibiotics and chemistry of poisonous substances. In 1966, he received the title of Professor.

In February 1980 Silaev was appointed to the position of consulting professor of the Laboratory of Antibiotics at the Department of Microbiology, Faculty of Biology, Moscow State University.

About 100 candidate and 10 doctoral theses were defended under his guidance and co-supervision, including representatives of foreign countries – Vietnam, India, Syria, Nigeria and Uganda.

== Honours and awards ==
In 1976 Silaev was awarded the title of Honoured Scientist of the RSFSR. He was awarded the Order "Badge of Honor", medals "For Valiant Labor in the Great Patriotic War of 1941–1945" and "In Commemoration of the 800th Anniversary of Moscow". For many years, Silaev was a member of numerous Academic Councils: Moscow State University named after M. V. Lomonosov, All-Russian Research Institute of Antibiotics, Research Institute for the Study of New Antibiotics of the USSR Academy of Medical Sciences, All-Union Scientific Center of the USSR Academy of Medical Sciences, Academic Council of the Faculty of Chemistry No. 5; a member of the Health Section of the USSR Ministry of Higher Education, a member of the Expert Commission of the Higher Attestation Commission and a member of the Editorial Board of the journal "Antibiotics", a representative of the Interfaculty Commission on Oncology.

== Family, children ==
Lidia Alekseevna Filippova (1907–2003), candidate of chemical sciences, senior researcher, was the wife of Aleksey Silaev. In 1929, she graduated from the Pedagogical Institute named after V. Lenin, then worked for a year in Tbilisi at the Institute of Silk Breeding. At Moscow University, she studied under the supervision of A. R. Kizel, worked as a researcher at the Institute of Meat Industry, then in the laboratory of protein chemistry under Professor N. I. Gavrilov and Academician N. D. Zelinsky at VIEM, later at the University on Mokhovaya Street in the Department of Organic Chemistry, Faculty of Chemistry. Moreover, Lidia taught classes on functional organic catalysis.

Children: Svetlana Alekseevna (1939) – Docent at the Department of Biochemistry, First Moscow State Medical University. She worked in the field of biochemistry of normal and abnormal metabolism.

Alexander Alekseevich (1943) – experimental physicist, worked in the field of space physics at the Research Institute of Nuclear Physics of Moscow State University.

Dmitry Alekseevich (1945) – theoretical mathematician, worked at the Department of Theoretical Problems of Management.
