= Chichagov =

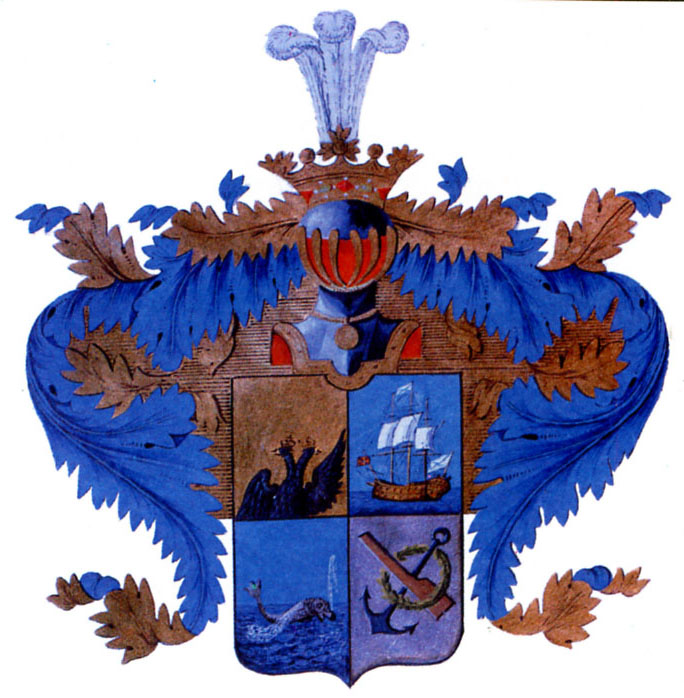
Coat of arms of the Chichagov family

The Chichagov family is an old Russian noble family dating back to the 15th century, whose members held prominent military positions within the Russian Empire.

== Surname ==
Chichagof(f) (masculine) or Chichagova (feminine) is also a Russian surname.

== Notable people ==
- Pavel Chichagov (1767–1849), a Russian military and naval commander in the Napoleonic Wars
- Seraphim Chichagov (b.? - 1937), martyr and Father Superior of the Monastery of Saint Euthymius
- Vasily Chichagov (1726–1809), an admiral in the Russian Navy
- Nikolai Chichagov (1803–1858), Russian architect
- Dmitrii Chichagov (1835–1894), Russian architect
- Olga and Galina Chichagova (1886–1958 and 1891–1966), Russian artists and children's book illustrators

== See also ==
- Chichagof Harbor, an inlet on Attu Island in the Aleutian Islands in Alaska
- Chichagof Island in the Alexander Archipelago of the Alaskan Panhandle
- Russian monitor Admiral Chichagov
- Russian ship Chichagoff, a ship in the service of Russian America in the early 19th century
