= Khoroshilov =

Khoroshilov, feminine: Khoroshilova is a Russian surname.

- Aleksandr Khoroshilov, Russian alpine ski racer
- Anastasia Khoroshilova, Rossian artist and arts educator
- Pavel Khoroshilov (1897-1964), Soviet major general
- Vladimir Khoroshilov (1911-1988) Soviet major general of aviation, Hero of the Soviet Union
