= Alexandri =

Alexandri may refer to:

== People ==
- Anna-Maria Alexandri (born 1997), Greek swimmer
- Eirini-Marina Alexandri (born 1997), Greek swimmer
- Nicolae N. Alexandri (1859-1931), Bessarabian politician
- Rabbi Alexandri, Palestinian amora
- Sara Alexandri (born 1913), Russian artist
- Vasiliki Alexandri (born 1997), Greek swimmer

== Books ==
- Anabasis Alexandri, ancient Greek manuscript
- Itinerarium Alexandri, Latin manuscript
