= Alexandris =

Alexandris (Greek: Αλεξανδρής) is a Greek surname. The female form of the surname is Alexandri. Notable people with the surname include:

- Alexis Alexandris (born 1968), Greek footballer and manager
- Efstathios Alexandris (1921–2013), Greek politician and lawyer
- Vangelis Alexandris (born 1951), Greek basketball player and coach

== See also ==
- Alexandri (disambiguation)
