= Rusheva =

Rusheva may refer to:

- Nadya Rusheva, a Russian artist
- 3516 Rusheva, an asteroid named after Nadya Rusheva
