= 0,10 Exhibition =

1915–1916 Russian exhibition

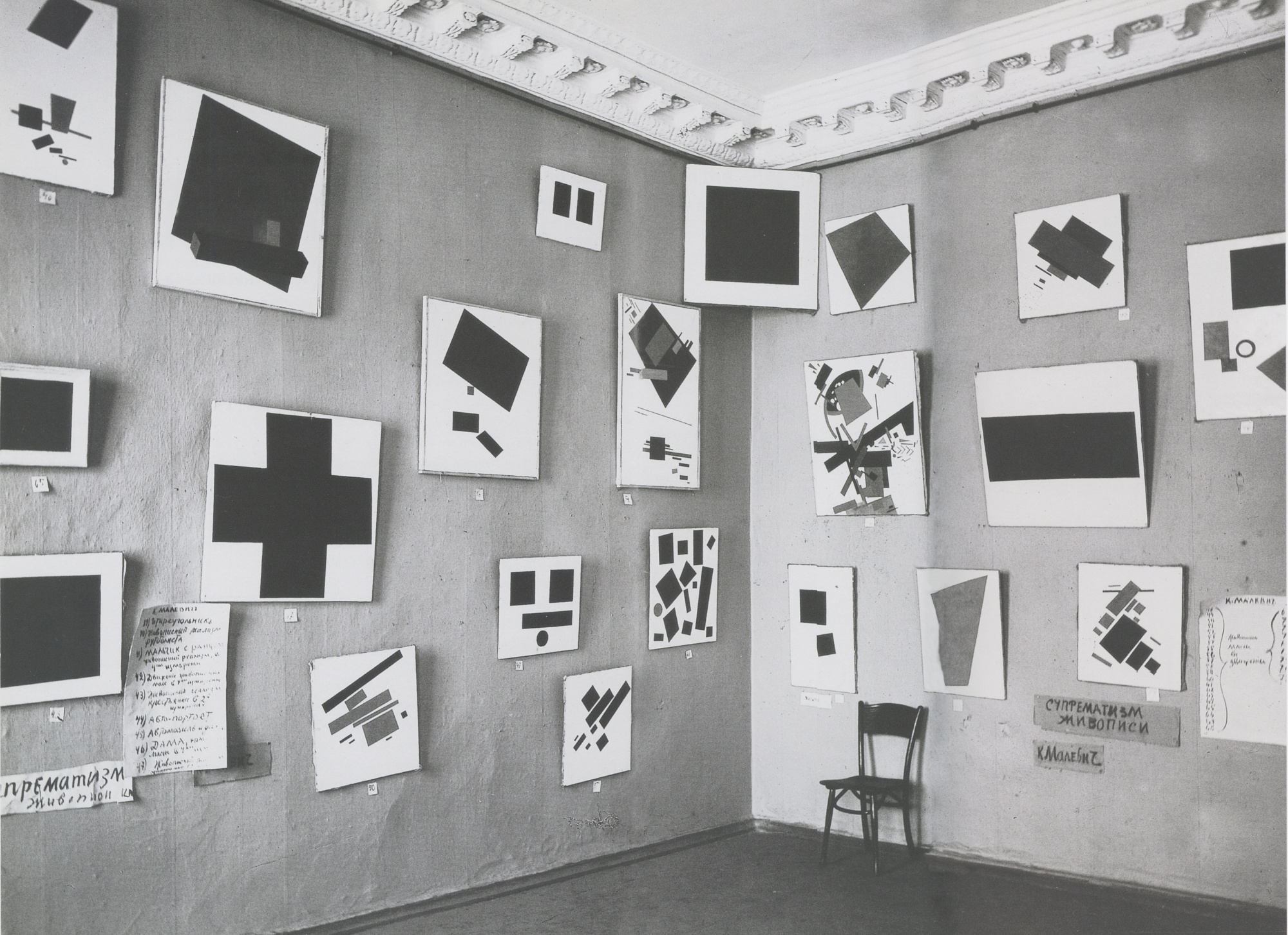
0,10 Exhibition, 1915, Petrograd

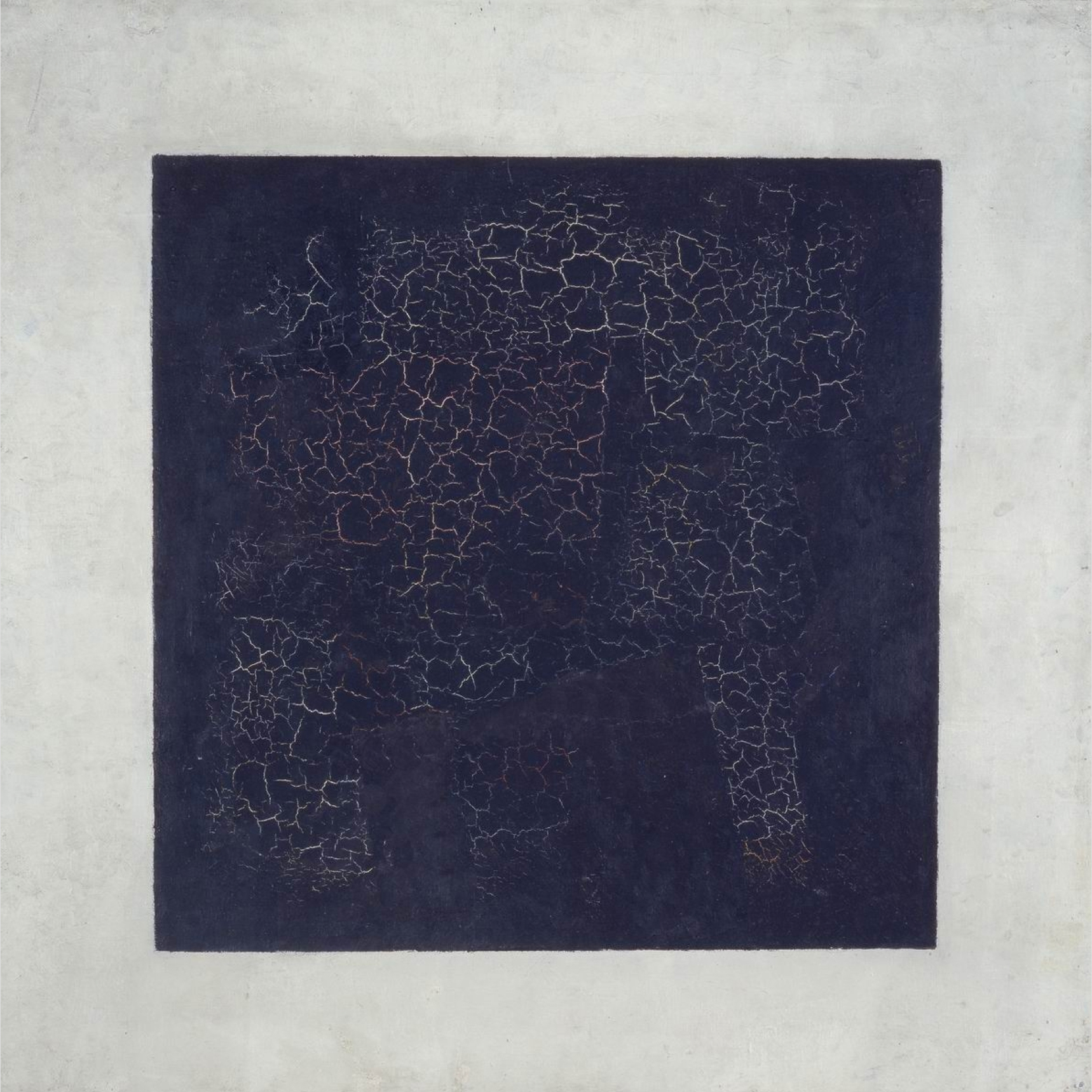
Kazimir Malevich, Black Suprematic Square, 1915, oil on linen, 79.5 × 79.5 cm, Tretyakov Gallery, Moscow

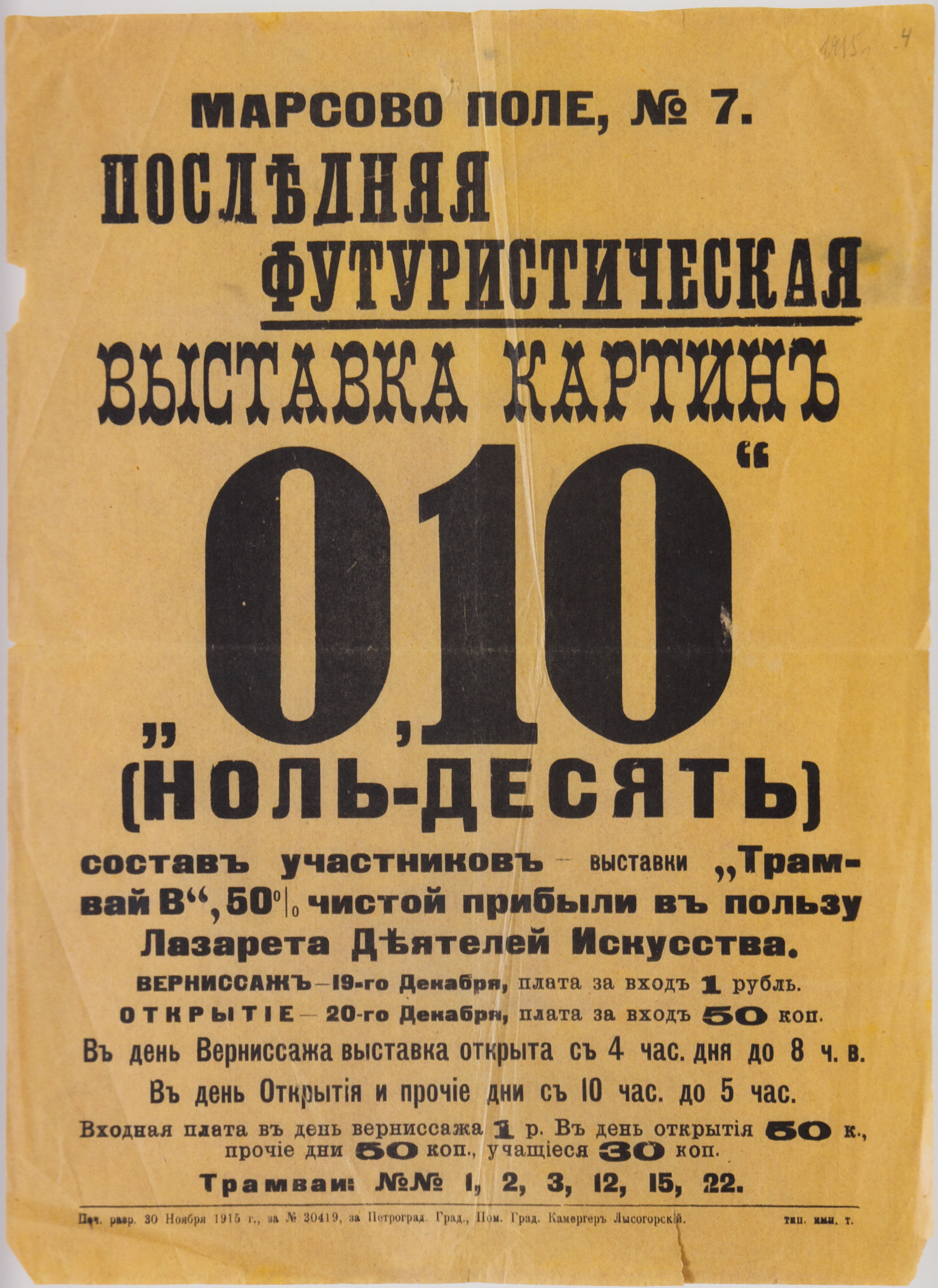
Poster

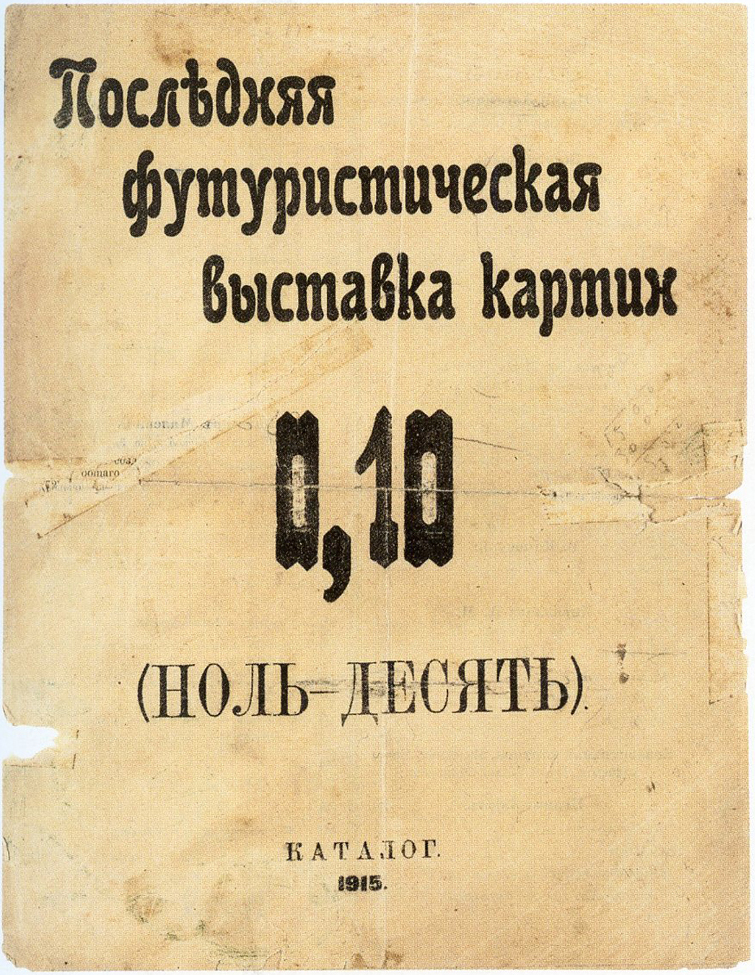
Cover of the Catalog

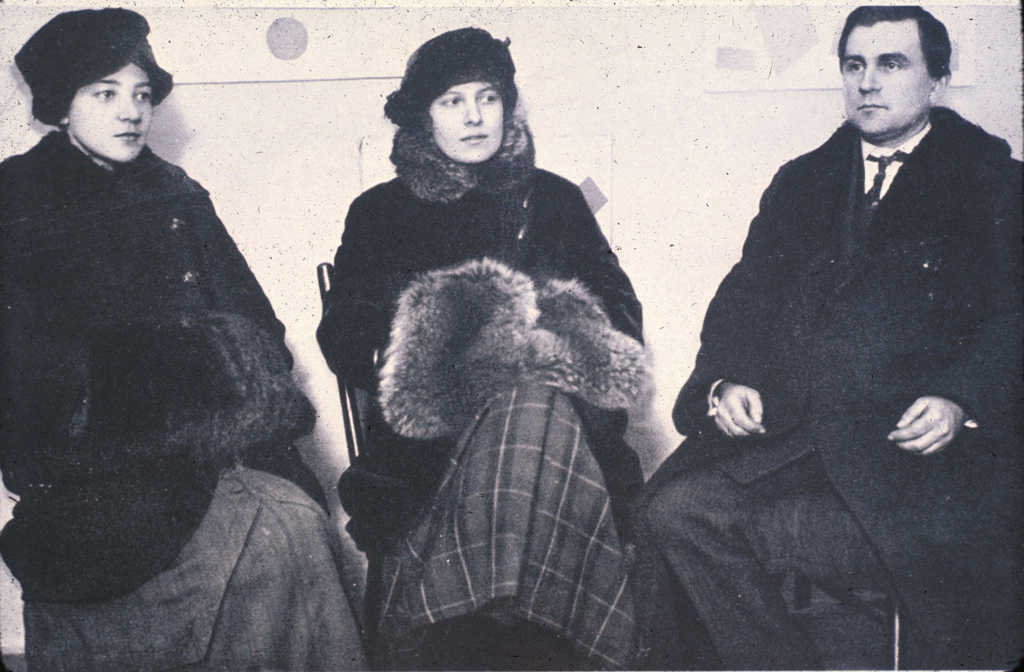
Rozanova, Boguslavskaya and Malevich at the exhibition

The Last Futurist Exhibition of Paintings 0,10 (pronounced "zero-ten"; Russian: Последняя футуристическая выставка картин «0,10») was an exhibition presented by the Dobychina Art Bureau at Marsovo Pole, Petrograd, from 19 December 1915 to 17 January 1916. The exhibition was important in inaugurating a form of non-objective art called Suprematism, introducing a daring visual vernacular composed of geometric forms of varying colour, and in signifying the end of Russia's previous leading art movement, Cubo-Futurism, hence the exhibition's full name. The sort of geometric abstraction relating to Suprematism was distinct in the apparent kinetic motion and angular shapes of its elements.

The title "0,10" refers to a figure of thought: Zero, either because it was expected that after the destruction of the old world, the year zero could begin again, or because the artists exhibiting wanted to find the core of painting, and ten, because ten artists were originally scheduled to participate. In fact, there were fourteen artists who participated in the exhibition. The non-numerical part of the exhibition's name, Last Exhibition of Futurist Paintings, was coined by the display's main organizer, Ivan Puni.

== Background and planning ==
In March 1915, Puni had organized the Tramway V: First Futurist Exhibition in Petrograd, which included work by Kazimir Malevich, Vladimir Tatlin, Lyubov Popova, Olga Rozanova, Nadezhda Udaltsova, and Alexandra Ekster. Over the following months, Malevich developed a body of non-objective work in his studio, producing his first composition featuring a black quadrilateral on a white ground during the summer of 1915. In September, Puni visited Malevich's studio and learned of the new work. Malevich, concerned that his ideas would be copied, composed his first text on Suprematism with the help of the composer Mikhail Matyushin. By October, Malevich was planning a dedicated Suprematist section within the exhibition without Puni's knowledge.

== Exhibition ==
The exhibition itself opened on 19 December 1915, and closed on 17 January 1916. Malevich now felt ready to officially announce Suprematism, and thus thirty-nine pieces of his work were on display. Because Malevich and Tatlin were, due to an argument, rivals by the time the exhibition began, some of the artists decided to take sides. Thanks to Malevich's room planning which even Puni was unaware of, (Note: Malevich wrote to Mikhail Matyushin (31 October 1915): "During this exhibition we already have the intention of having a section for the suprematists. Puni does not know it yet." Quoted by Boersma, Linda in 0,10: Last Futurist Exhibition of Painting (0,10 Publications, 1995; translated by Fitzpatrick, John); p. 50) the artists who supported Malevich became the victors.

In total, 155 works were shown. Highlights of the exhibition were Malevich's Black Square, Tatlin's Corner Counter Reliefs, and Olga Rozanova's Metronome. Black Square was seen by some visitors as being especially scandalous, because it was placed in the top corner of the room, a location where Russian Orthodox households place their icons. Corner Counter Reliefs were a series of abstract sculptures. Metronome was one of Rozanova's works during the middle stages in her career; the clock can be interpreted as combining moments with the infinite. Several related publications, for example the catalogue and Malevich's From Cubism to Suprematism, accompanied the exhibition. The poster was designed by Puni.

== Impact and legacy ==
Though only a single photograph of Malevich's exhibition space survives, the exhibition is credited as introducing a groundbreaking new era in avant-garde art. Malevich and several other artists would go on to paint in the Suprematist style, while Tatlin would become a Constructivist, and later become famous for his eponymous Tower.

== Artists ==
The following artists eventually exhibited:

- Kazimir Malevich
- Vladimir Tatlin
- Ivan Puni
- Liubov Popova
- Ivan Kliun
- Ksenia Boguslavskaya
- Olga Rozanova
- Nadezhda Udaltsova
- Nathan Altman
- Vasily Kamensky
- Vera Pestel
- Maria Ivanovna Vasilieva
- Anna Mikhailovna Kirillova
- Mikhail Menkov

== See also ==
- Suprematism
- Russian avant-garde
- Vkhutemas

== References and sources ==
Sources

- Malevich: Journey to Infinity, 2008. Author: Gerry Souter, 255 pages in English language, publisher: Parkstone International, ISBN 978-1-85995-684-7
- Farewell to an Idea: Episodes from a History of Modernism, 2001. Author: T.J. Clark, 451 pages, Publisher: Yale University Press, ISBN 0-300-08910-4
