= Olga Rozanova =

Russian painter

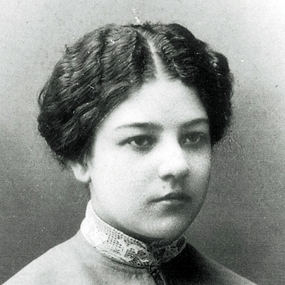
- Rozanova in 1900
- Born: Olga Vladimirovna Rozanova; 22 July 1886; Melenki, near Vladimir Oblast, Russia
- Died: 7 November 1918 (aged 32); Moscow, Soviet Russia
- Resting place: Novodevichy Convent, Moscow
- Movement: Cubo-Futurism, Suprematism

External videos
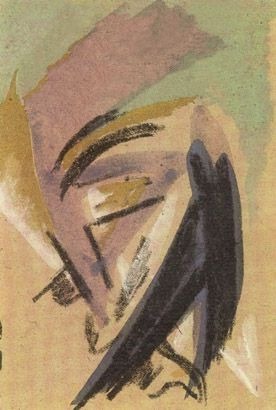
- MoMA Celebrates 1913: Olga Rozanova’s Little Duck’s Nest…of Bad Words, Museum of Modern Art

Olga Vladimirovna Rozanova (also spelled Rosanova, Russian: Ольга Владимировна Розанова) (22 June 1886 – 7 November 1918, Moscow) was a Russian avant-garde artist painting in the styles of Suprematism, Neo-Primitivism, and Cubo-Futurism.

== Biography ==
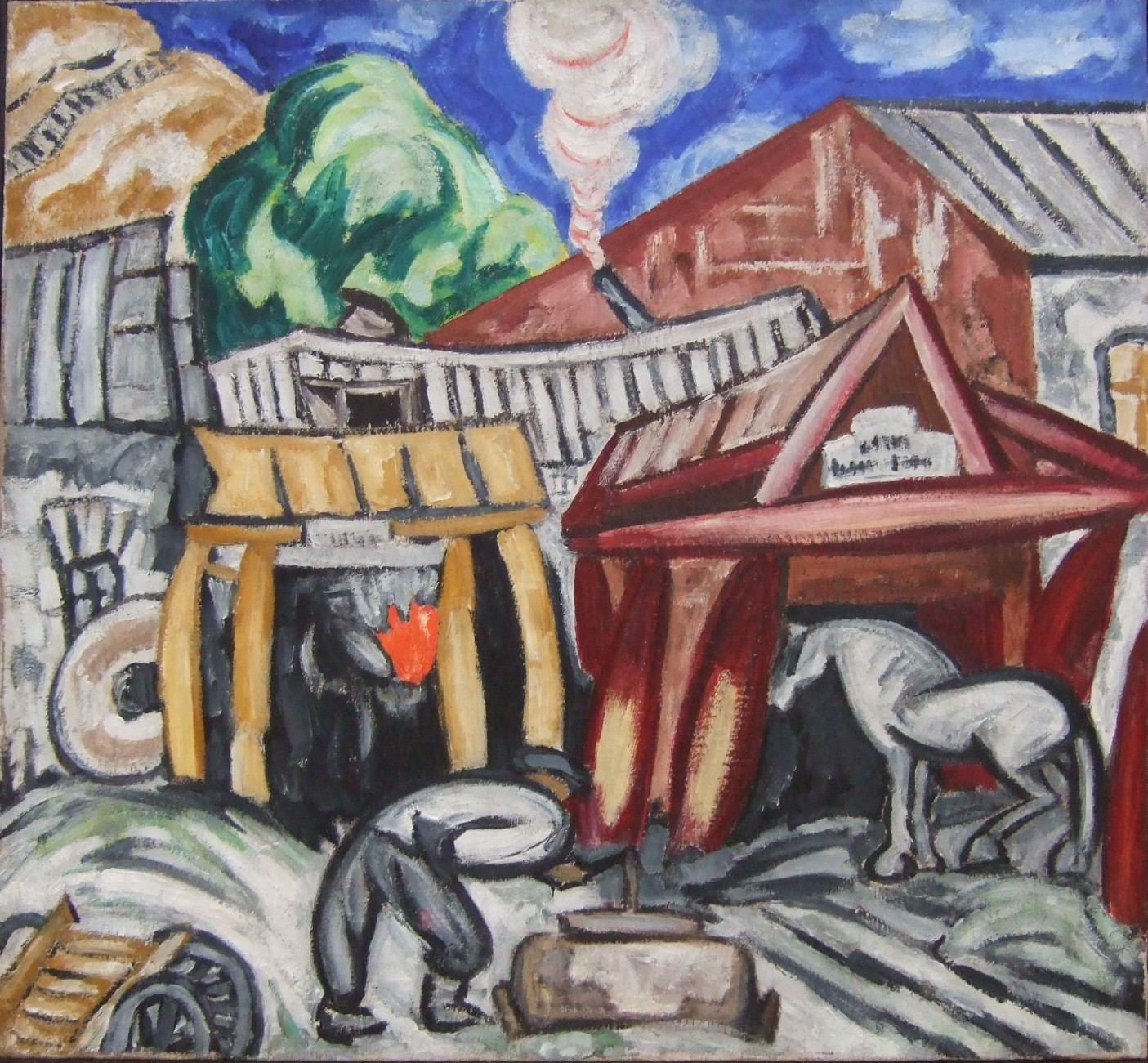
Smithy, 1912

=== Early life ===
Olga Rozanova was born in Melenki, a small town near Vladimir. Her father, Vladimir Rozanov, was a district police officer and her mother, Elizaveta Rozanova, was the daughter of an Orthodox priest. She was the family's fifth child; she had two sisters, Anna and Alevtina, and two brothers, Anatolii and Vladimir. Rozanova's father died in 1903, and her mother became the head of the household.

She graduated from the Vladimir Women's Gymnasium in 1904. Due to her interest in the avant-garde movement, she moved to Moscow to study painting.

=== Artistic career ===
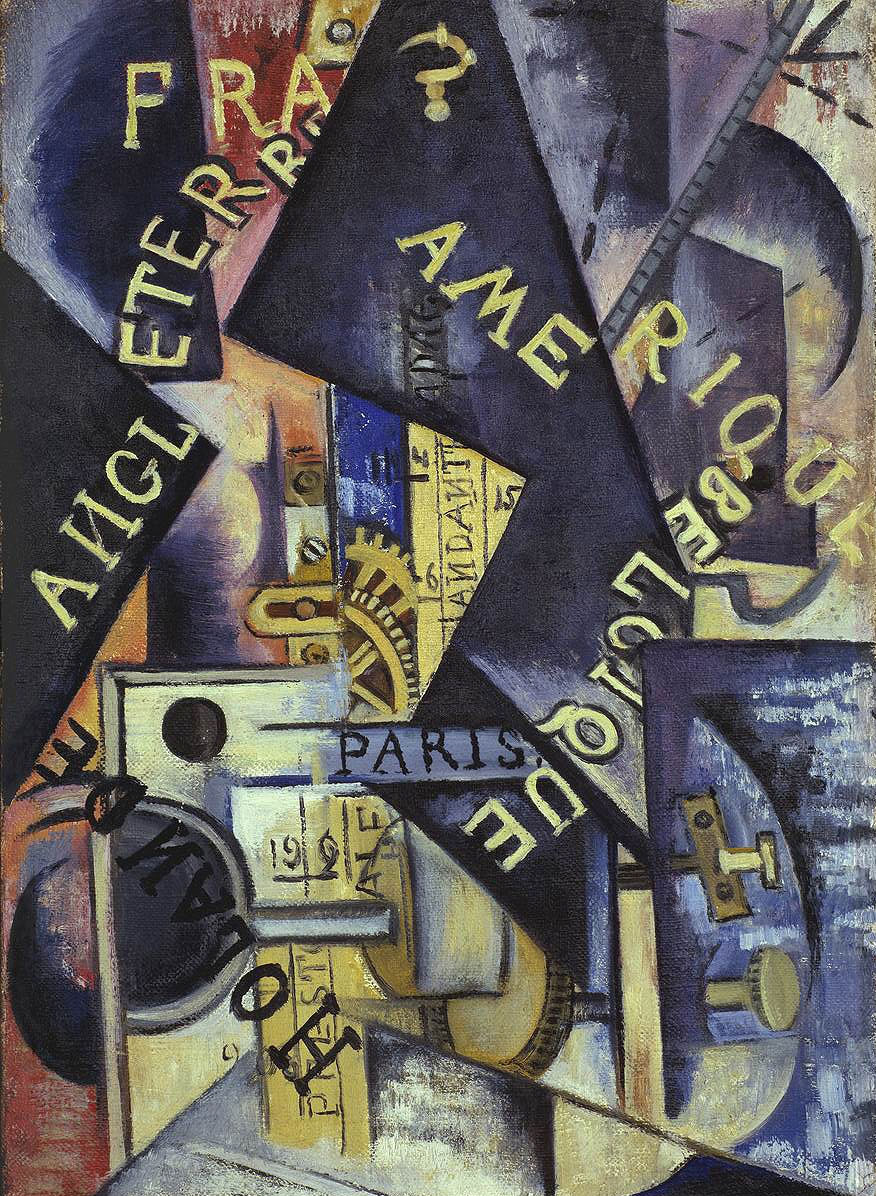
Metronome (1915)

After arriving in Moscow, she attended the Bolshakov Art School, where she worked under Nikolai Ulyanov and sculptor Andrey Matveev. She audited courses at the Stroganov School of Applied Art in 1907 but was not accepted for admission. After this, she trained in the private studio of Konstantin Yuon. From 1907 to 1910, fellow drawing and painting students studying in these private studios included Lyubov Popova, Nadezhda Udaltsova, Aleksei Kruchenykh, and Serge Charchoune. Unlike most of the other female avant-garde artists, Rozanova was the only one who did not study abroad to learn about European art.

By 1910, she was fairly well-known in Russian art circles. She moved to St. Petersburg and joined Soyuz Molodyozhi (Union of Youth) in 1911. She became one of the most active members of this organization, which organized art exhibitions, lectures, and discussions. Two of her canvases, Nature-morte and The Café debuted at the second Soyuz Molodyozhi exhibition in April 1911. She would submit her canvases to their group exhibitions until 1913. Razanova briefly studied at the art school of Elizabeta Zvantseva, which housed many Russian Art Nouveau artists. In January 1912, her two works, Portrait and Still-Life, appeared at the next Soyuz Molodyozhi exhibition in January 1912. This exhibition was the first appearance of the Donkey's Tail, a Moscow-based artistic group led by Mikhail Larionov. Rozanova later traveled to Moscow to try to establish joint projects between the two groups; these negotiations proved to be unsuccessful. Soyuz Molodyozhi disbanded in 1914.

From 1913 to 1914, Cubo-Futurist ideas appeared in her work, but she appears to have been especially inspired by Futurism. Of all the Russian Cubo-Futurists, Rozanova's work most closely upholds the ideals of Italian Futurism. During Filippo Tommaso Marinetti's visit to Russia in 1914, he was very impressed with her work. Rozanova later exhibited four works in the First Free International Futurist Exhibition in Rome, which took place from 13 April to 25 May 1914. Other Russian artists featured in the exhibition included Alexander Archipenko, Nikolai Kulbin, and Aleksandra Ekster.

She met the poet Aleksei Kruchenykh in 1912; he then introduced her to the Russian Futurist concept of zaum (translated as "beyonsence") poetry, a language with no fixed meanings and constant neologisms. Rozanova would write her own poetry in that style, and also illustrated books of zaum poetry, two examples being A Little Duck's Nest of Bad Words and Explodity (both 1913). With Kruchenykh, she would invent a new kind of Futurist book, the samopismo, where the illustrations and the text would be literally connected.

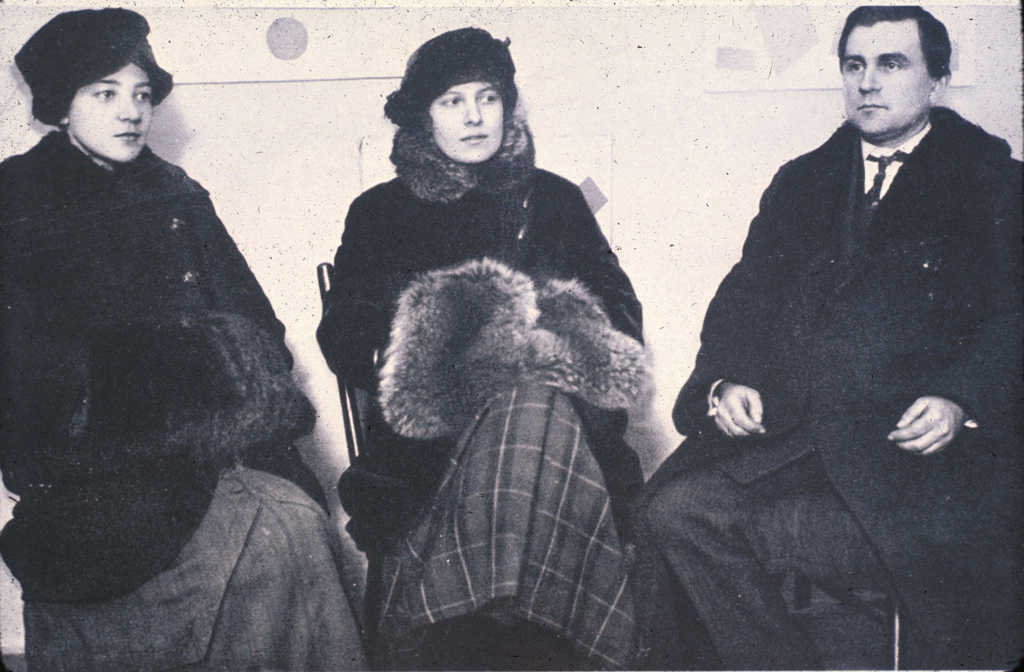
Rozanova, Boguslavkaya, and Malevich at the 0,10 Exhibition

Rozanova joined the avant-garde group Supremus that year, which was led by former fellow Cubo-Futurist Kazimir Malevich. By this time, her paintings have developed from the influences of Cubism and Futurism, and took an original departure into pure abstraction, where the composition is organized by the visual weight and relationship of color.

In the same year she exhibited at the 0,10 Exhibition, and, together with other Suprematist artists (Kazimir Malevich, Aleksandra Ekster, Nina Genke, Liubov Popova, Ksenia Boguslavskaya, Nadezhda Udaltsova, Ivan Kliun, Ivan Puni and others) worked at the Verbovka Village Folk Centre.

From 1917 to 1918 she created a series of non-objective paintings which she called tsv'etopis'. Her Non-objective composition, 1918 also known as Green stripe anticipates the flat picture plane and poetic nuancing of color of some Abstract Expressionists.

Rozanova also published literary works, which included the essay The Bases of the New Creation and the Reasons Why it is Misunderstood. This was written in response to critics of modern art and held that the world is a raw material - that it is the back of a mirror for the unreceptive soul and a mirror of images for the reflective soul. She maintained that the creation of pictures based on the "Abstract Principle" constitute three stages: the intuitive principle; the individual transformation of the visible; and, abstract creation. In her criticism of photography, Rozanova agreed with Oscar Wilde that photography is for the "servile artist".

=== Death and legacy ===
She died of diphtheria at the age of 32 in Moscow in 1918, following a cold she contracted while working on preparations for the first anniversary of the October Revolution.

Her work is in the collections of the Museum of Modern Art, the Philadelphia Museum of Art, the Thyssen-Bornemisza Museum, and the Carnegie Museum of Art,

Rozanova's work was included in the 2021 exhibition Women in Abstraction at the Centre Pompidou.

== Major works ==
- In a Cafe (c.1911-1912) - One of Rozanova's earlier pieces, In a Café, depicts a man and a woman on opposing sides of a table, the man with his head in his hand and the women with a drink in hers. Rozanova makes use of vibrant colors and thick lines to create a piece with aspects of French avant-garde and Russian Neo-Primitivistic art.
- The Factory and the Bridge (c. 1913) - The Factory and the Bridge was included in the First Free International Futurist Exhibition in 1914. This piece had inspiration from the Italian Futurism movement, and its bright colors gives it an expressionist tone.
- Metronome (c. 1914) - A piece from the middle of her career, Metronome was displayed at the Last Futurist Exhibition 0,10 in Petrograd in 1915.
- Playing Cards series (1915) - One of her most famous works, the series represents the height of her artistic career. It consists of portraits of her peers set as designs for playing cards.

== Gallery ==
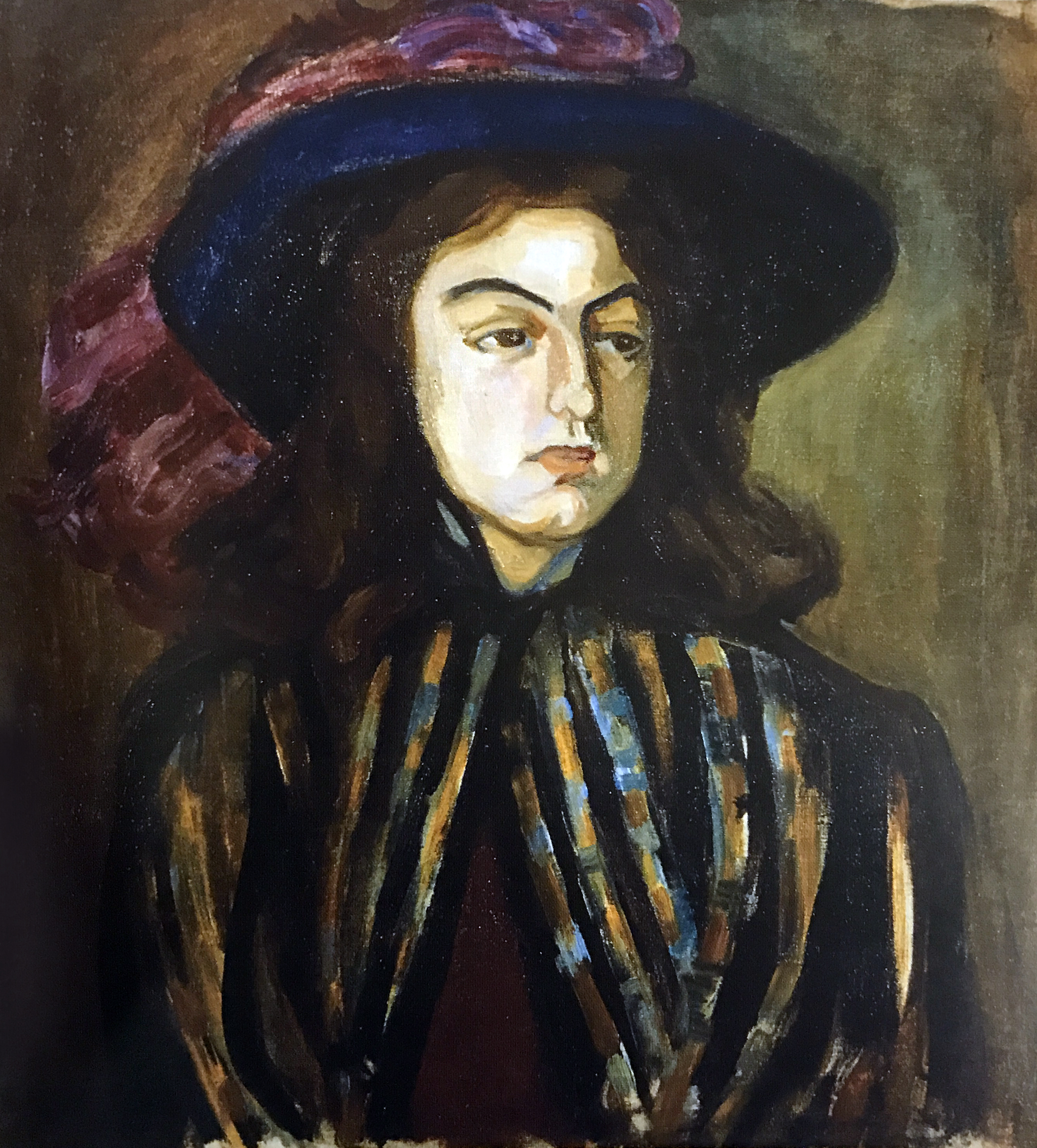
Female Portrait (1907)

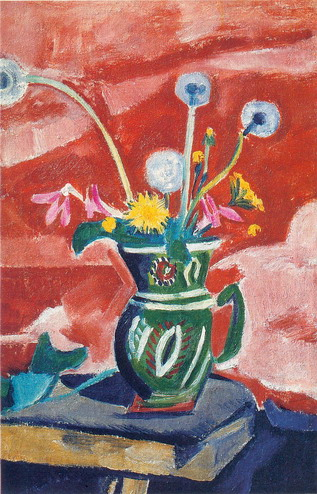
Jug with Flowers (1911-1912)

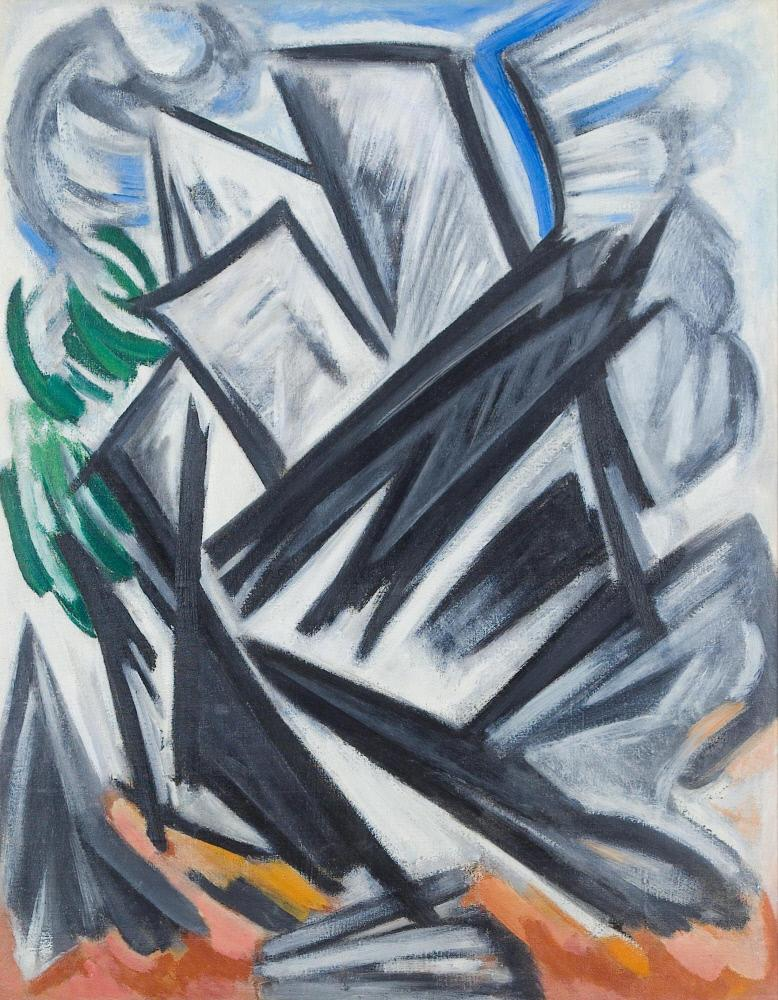
Dissonance (1913)

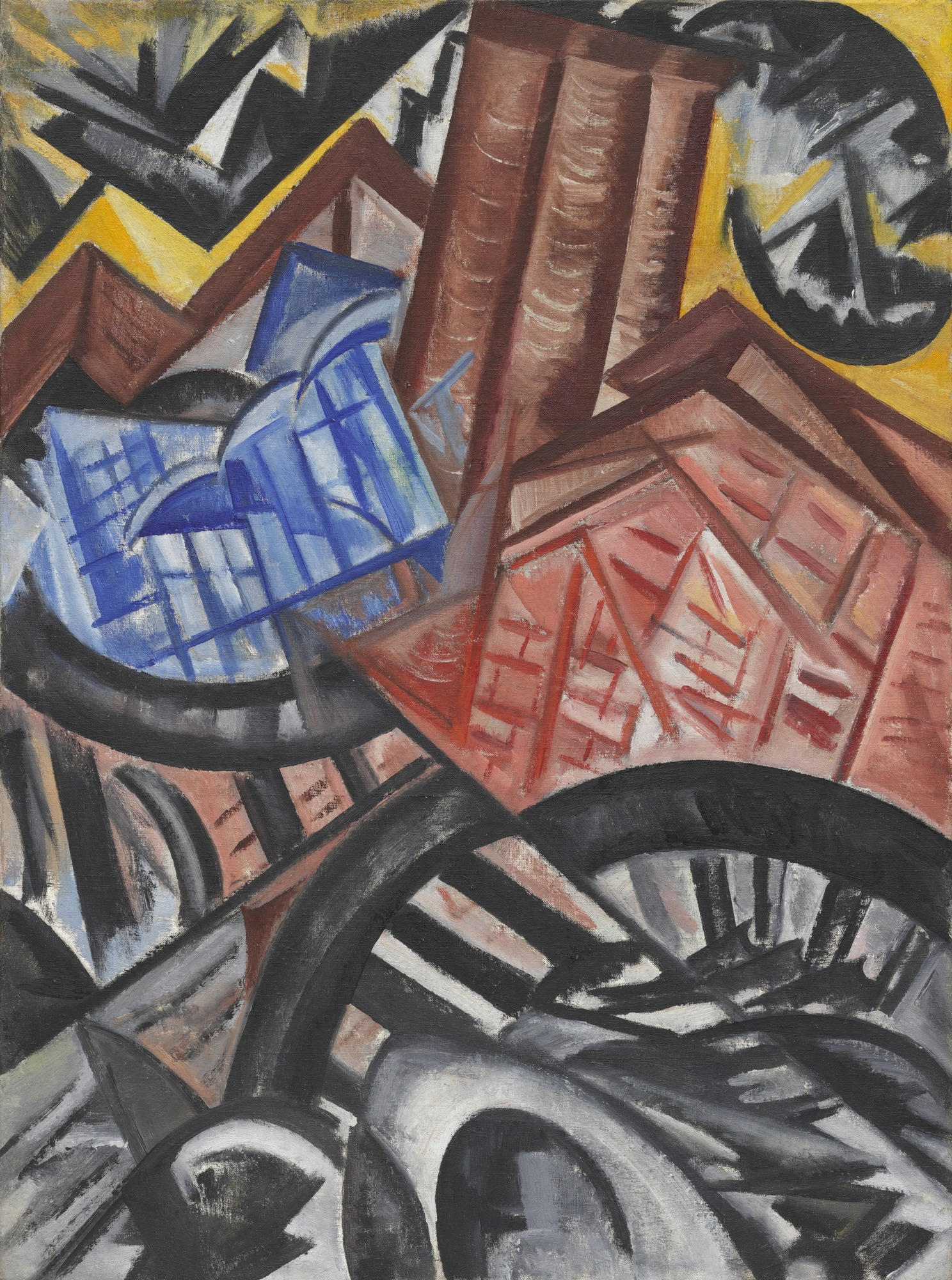
Factory and Bridge (1913)

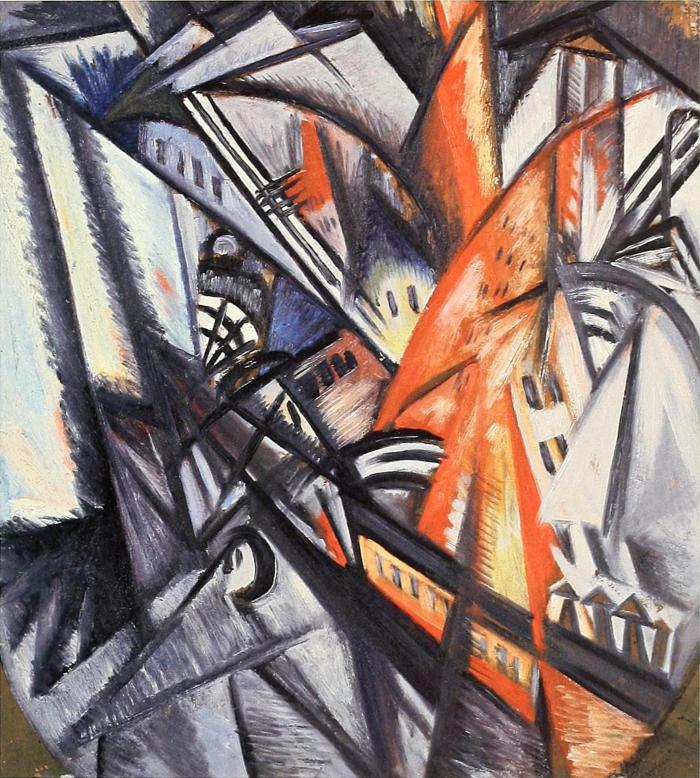
Cityscape (1914)

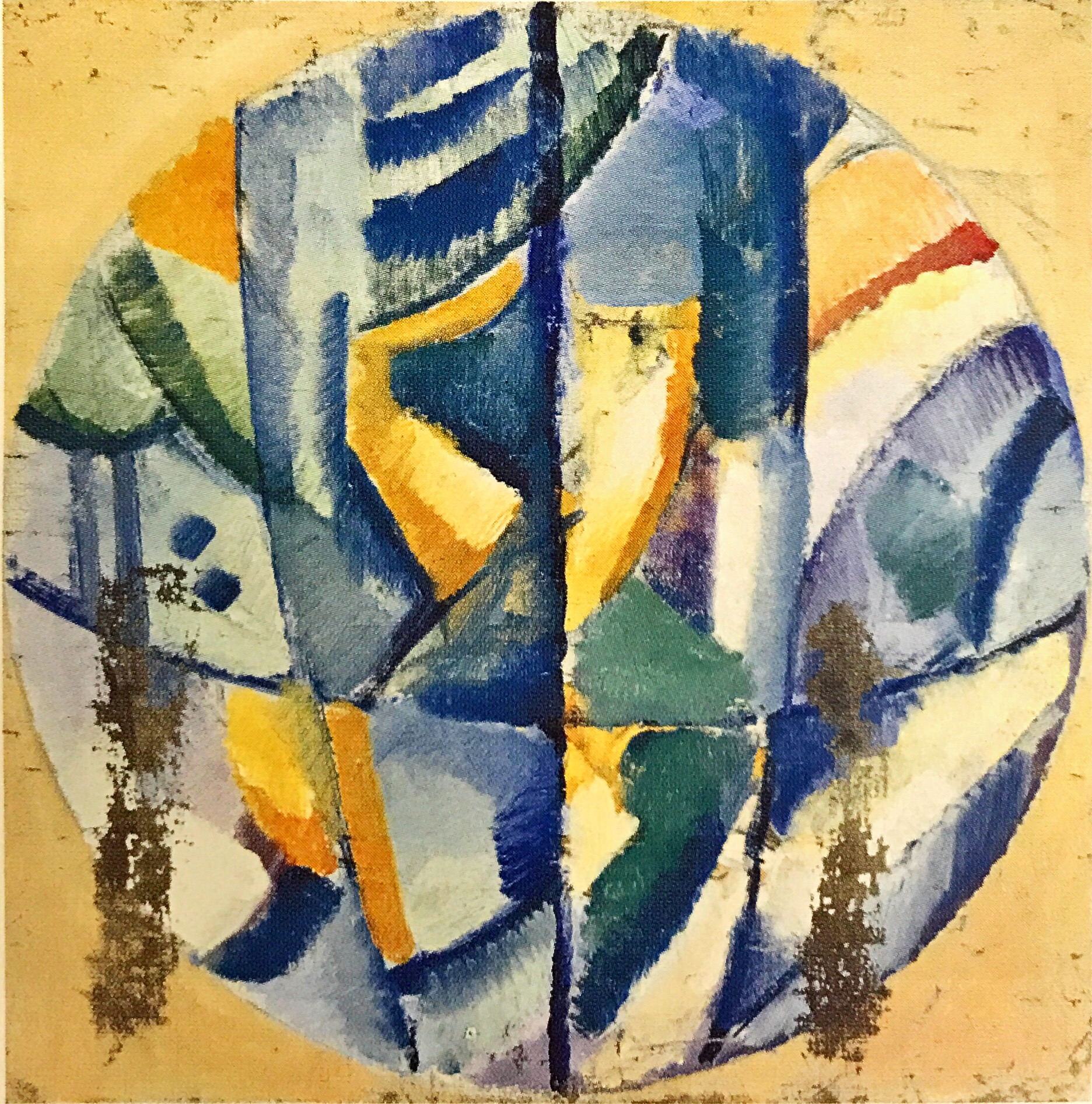
Third Colour Composition (all 1914)

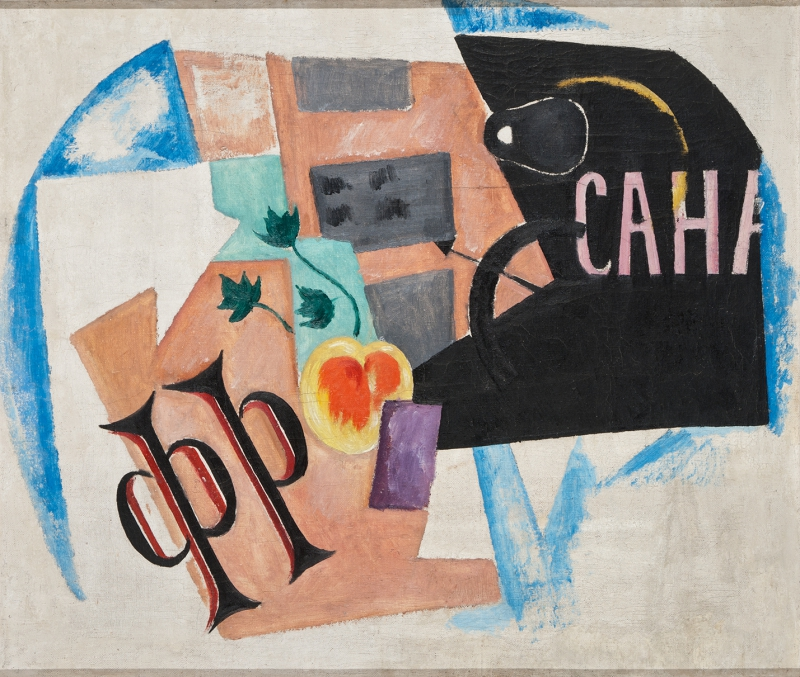
Still-Life (Futurist Composition) (1915)

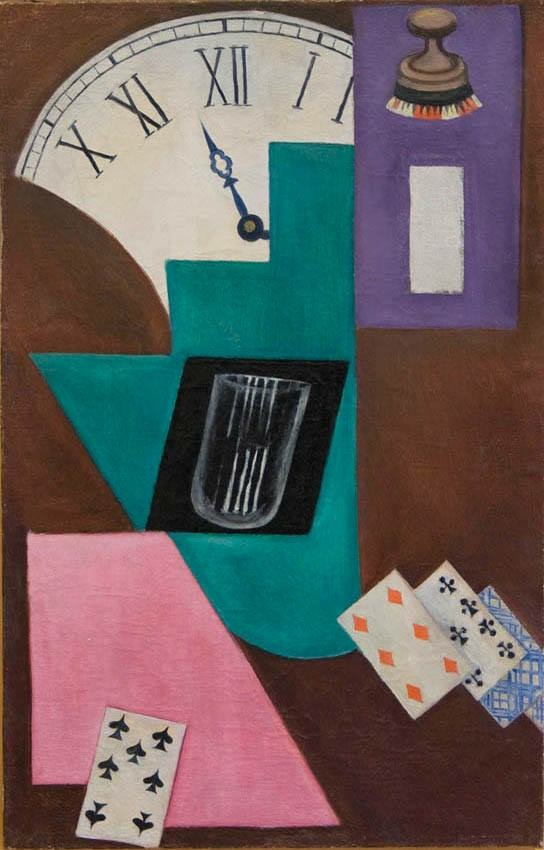
Watches and Cards (1915)

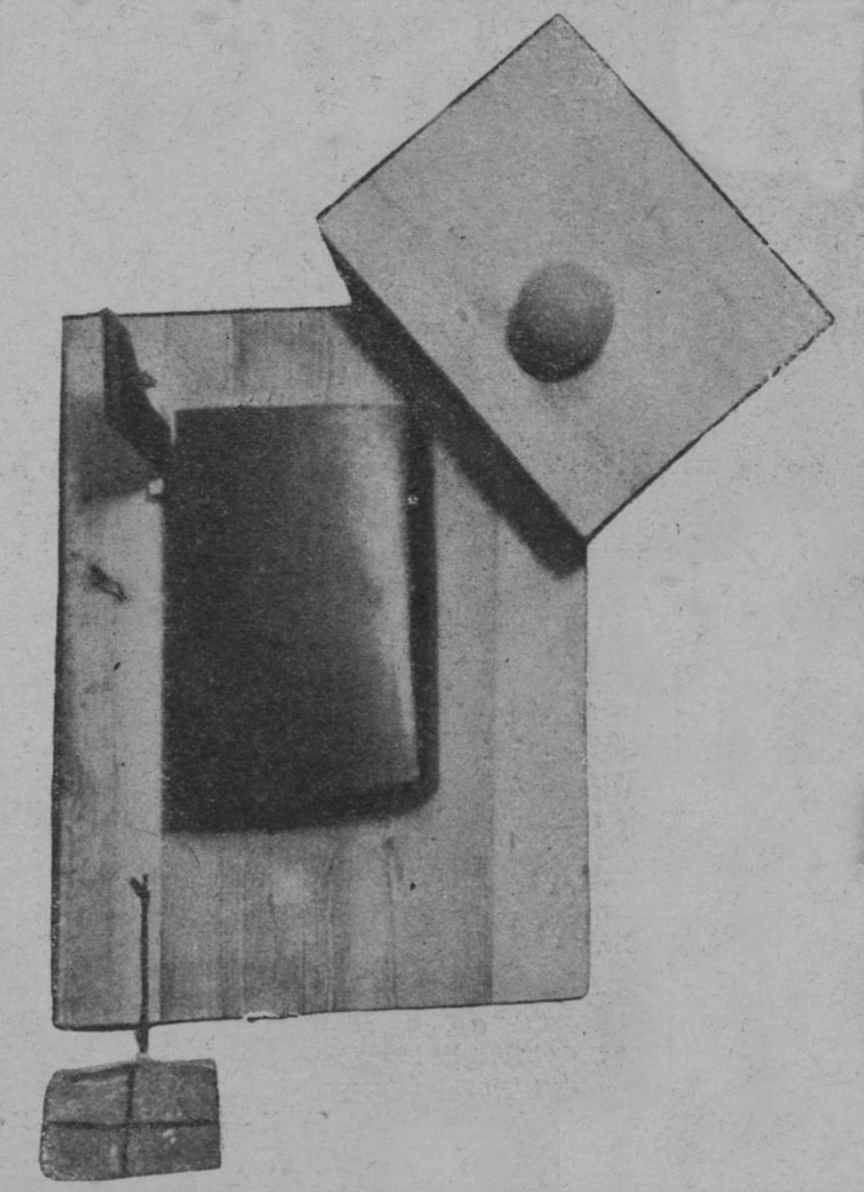
Automobile (1915)

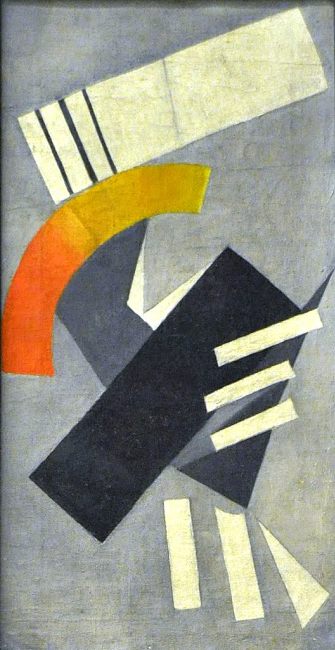
Suprematism (1916)

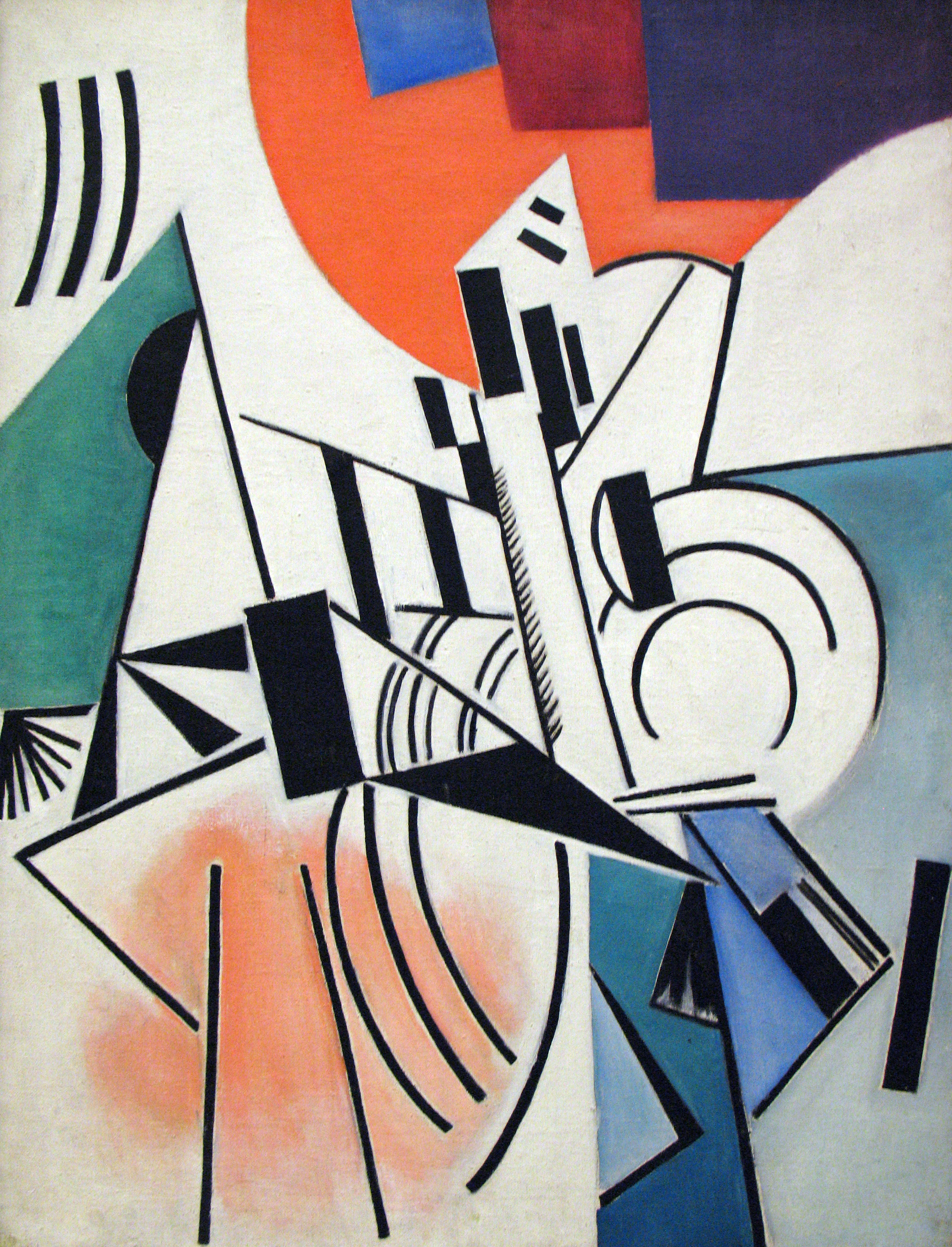
Non-Objective Composition (1917)

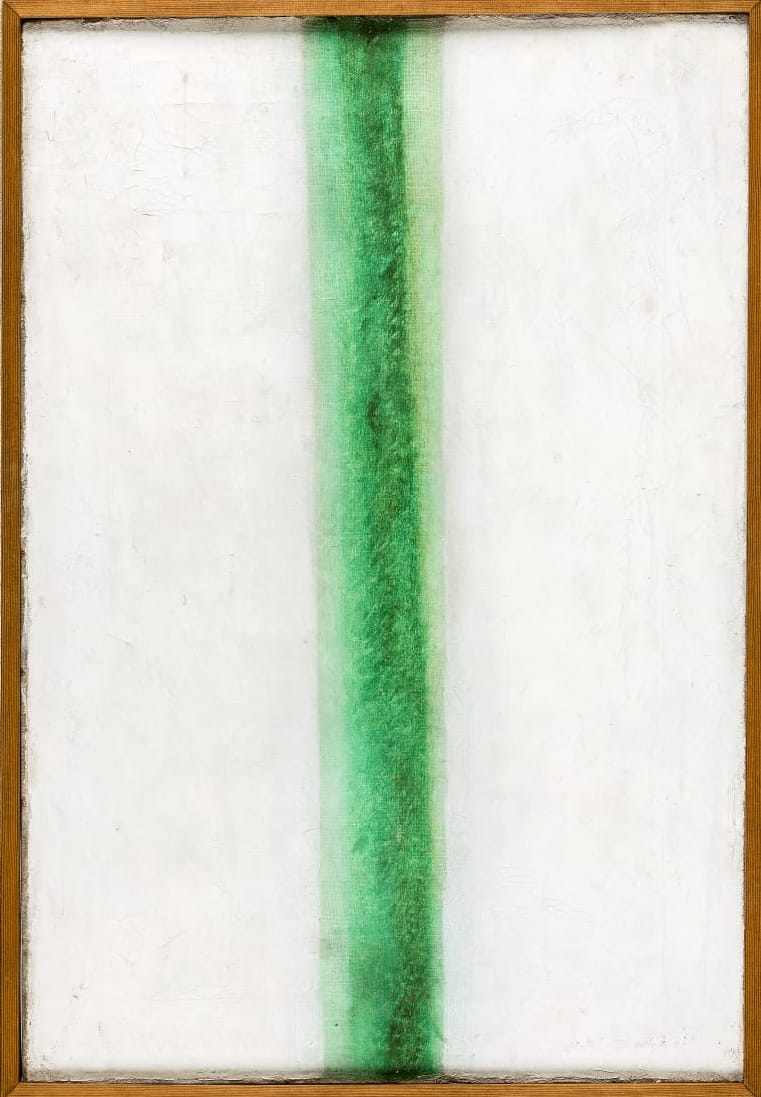
Green Stripe (1917)

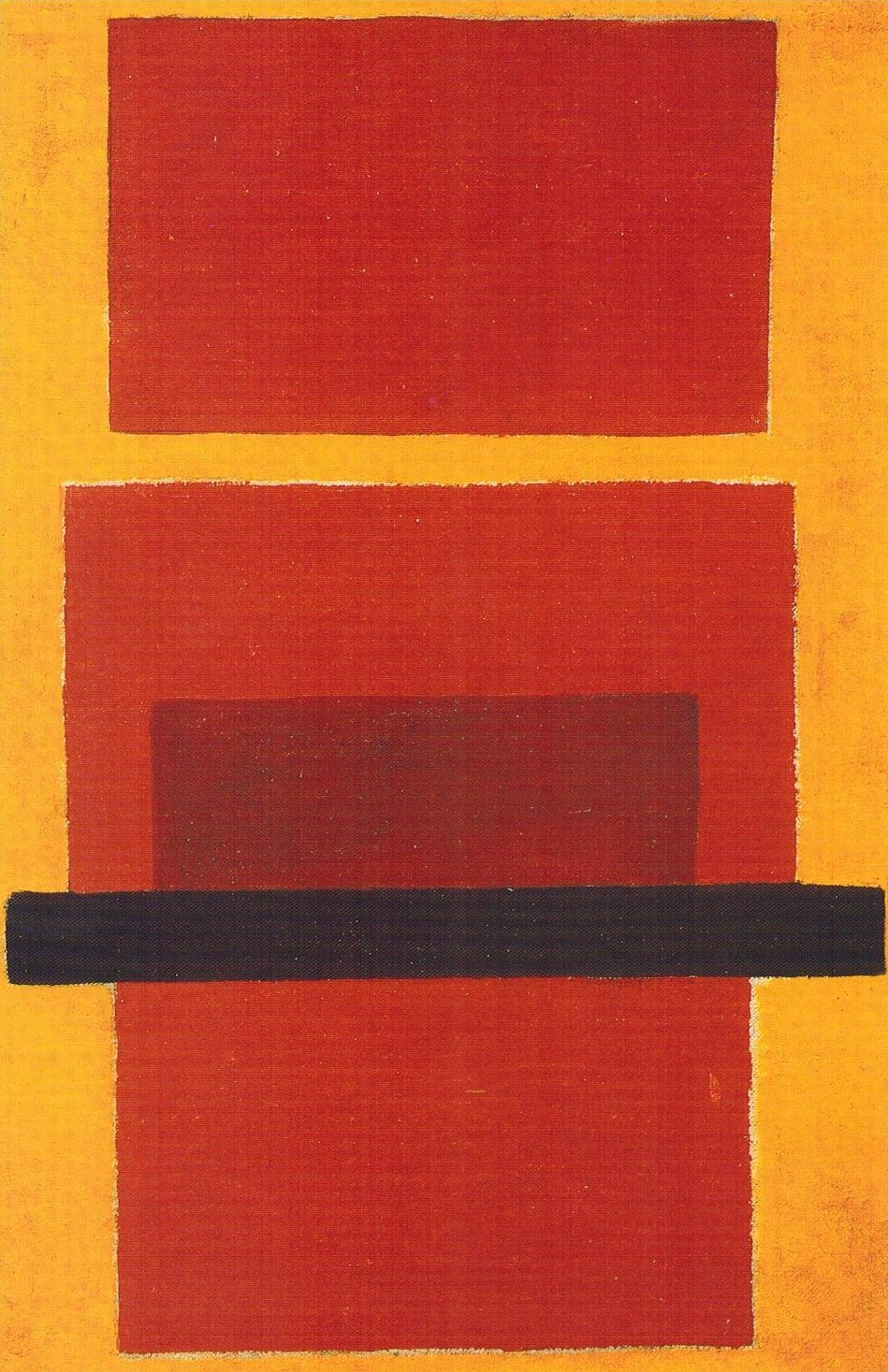
Non-Objective Composition (1917)

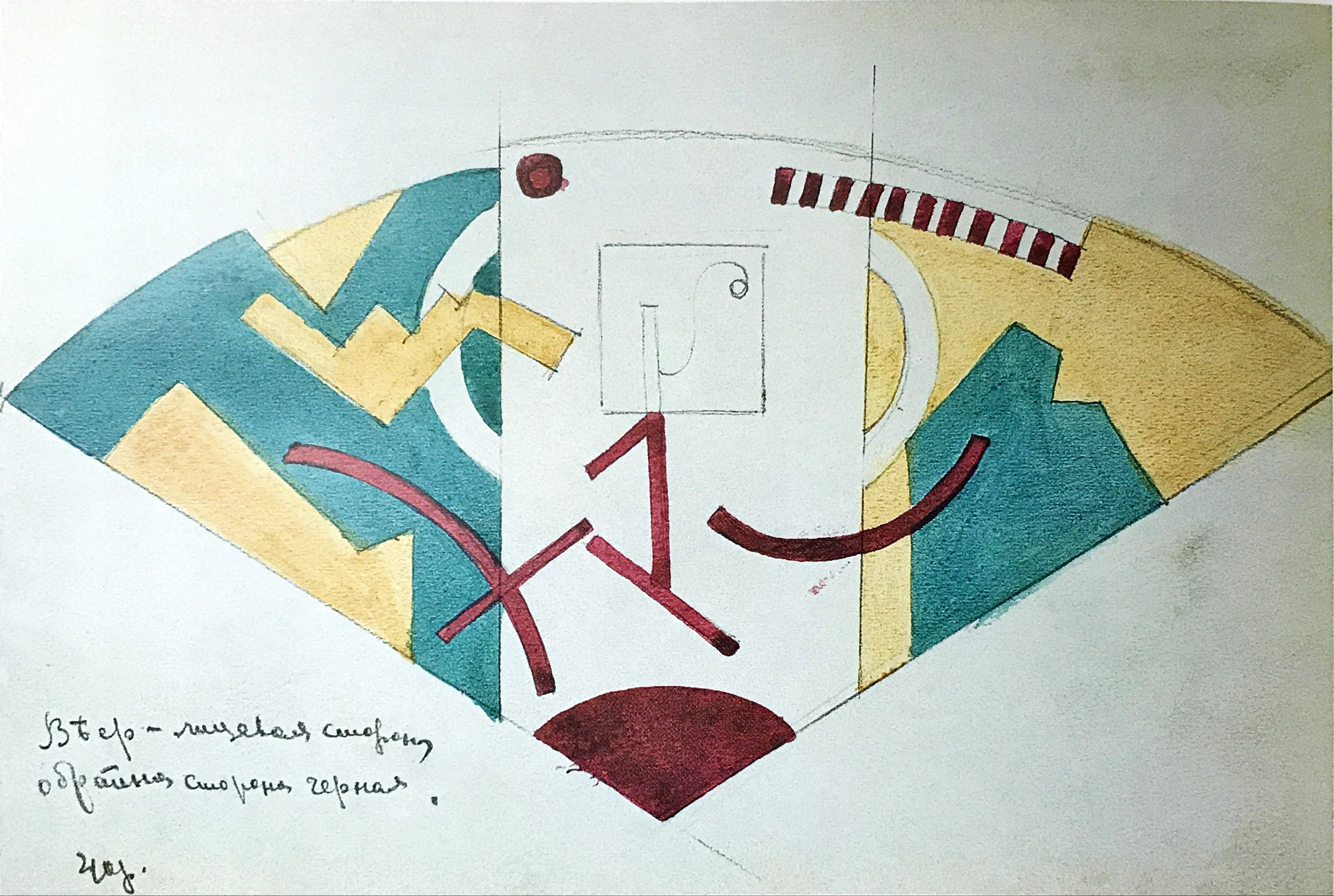
Hand Fan - Design for Verbovka (1917)
