= Ivan Puni =

Russian artist

- Born: Ivan Albertovich Puni; 3 April 1890; Kuokkala, Grand Duchy of Finland, Russian Empire
- Died: 28 December 1956 (aged 66); Paris, France
- Resting place: Montparnasse Cemetery, Paris

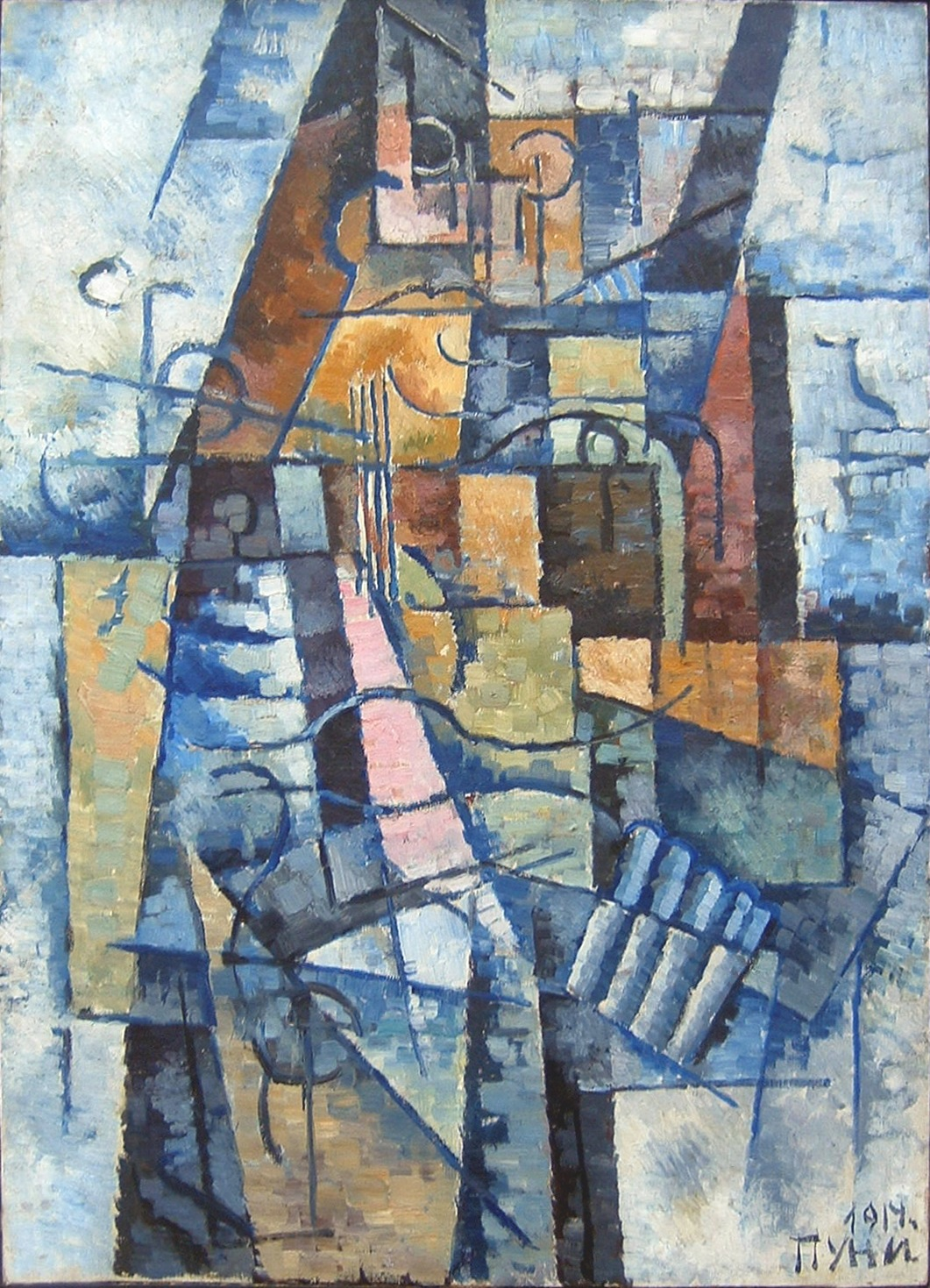
Ivan Puni, 1914, Portrait of Artist's Wife (Портрет жены художника), oil on canvas, 89 x 62.5 cm, The Russian Museum, St. Petersburg

Ivan Albertovich Puni (Russian: Ива́н Альбе́ртович Пу́ни; also known as Jean Pougny; 3 April [O.S. 22 March] 1890 – 28 December 1956) was a Russian avant-garde (Suprematist, Cubo-Futurist) and French artist, who intensively changed his style until it went into lyric Primitivism in the direction of Pierre Bonnard and Édouard Vuillard.

== Biography ==
=== Early life ===
Ivan Puni was born in Kuokkala (then Grand Duchy of Finland in the Russian Empire, now Repino, a part of St. Petersburg in Russia). It was long believed that Ivan Puni was born in 1892 or 1894 until his birth certificate was found in 2019 in a St. Petersburg archive, showing his birth date as 22 March 1890 (old style). He was the grandson of an eminent Italian composer of ballet music, Cesare Pugni. His father, a cellist, proposed him a military career, but Ivan instead decided to become a painter.

=== Career ===
Puni continued his formal training in Paris in 1910–11 at the Académie Julian and other schools, where he painted in a derivative fauviste style. Upon his return to Russia in 1912, he married fellow artist Xenia Boguslavskaya, and met, and exhibited with, members of the St Petersburg avant-garde, including Kazimir Malevich and Vladimir Tatlin. He made a second trip to Paris in 1914, returning to St. Petersburg with the outbreak of WWI. At this point, he began painting in a Cubist style reminiscent of Juan Gris. In 1915, Puni organized the exhibitions Tramway V and 0.10, both held in St Petersburg, in which Malevich, Tatlin, Aleksandra Ekster, Liubov Popova, Ivan Kliun, Olga Rozanova, Nadezhda Udaltsova, Boguslavskaya and others participated, and to which Puni contributed constructions, readymades, and paintings. In 1915–1916 Puni, together with other Suprematist artists, worked at Verbovka Village Folk Centre. In 1919, he taught at the Vitebsk Art School under Marc Chagall.

=== Years of exile ===
Puni and his wife, Xenia Boguslavskaya, emigrated from Russia in February 1920, first to Finland, then to Berlin, where his solo exhibition was held at the Galerie der Sturm (February 1921). While in Berlin, Puni also designed costumes and sets for theatrical productions, and published a theoretical book Modern Painting.

Puni and Boguslavskaya relocated to Paris in 1923, where he carried on with development of his style, which experienced several metamorphoses until it stabilized at approximately 1942 to a variant of Post-Impressionism or lyric Primitivism in the direction of Pierre Bonnard and Édouard Vuillard. In France he became "Jean Pougny" and in 1947 obtained French citizenship. He died in Paris in 1956.

=== Literature ===
- Муромцева О. В., Родионов А. Н. «БУ-ММ!»: подлинная история Ксаны Богуславской и Ивана Пуни. — М.: Музей современного искусства «Гараж», 2026. — 312 с. ISBN 978-5-605-17188-1
- Herman Berninger: Pougny. Jean Pougny (Iwan Puni) 1892–1956. Catalogue de l’Œuvre. Tome 1: Les Années d`avant-garde, Russie — Berlin, 1910—1923. E. Wasmuth Verlag, Tübingen 1972, ISBN 3-8030-3000-5
- Herman Berninger: Pougny. Jean Pougny (Iwan Puni) 1892—1956. Catalogue de l` oeuvre. Tome 2: Paris-Cote d’Azur, 1924—1956, Peintures. E. Wasmuth Verlag, Tübingen, 1992, ISBN 3-8030-3045-5.
- Iwan Puni. 1892—1956. Katalog zur Ausstellung des Musée d’Art Moderne de la Ville de Paris und der Berlinischen Galerie. Bearb. v. Jean-Louis Andral, Jean-Claude Marcadé und Marie-Anne Chambost. Hatje, Stuttgart, 1993, ISBN 3-927873-32-2.
- Magdalena Nieslony: Bedingtheit der Malerei. Ivan Puni und die moderne Bildkritik. Berlin 2016, ISBN 978-3-7861-2764-2
- Herman Berninger, 0,10 Iwan Puni. Werke Aus Der Sammlung Herman Berninger, Zuerich, Und Fotografien Der Russischen Revolution Aus Der Sammlung Ruth Und Peter Herzog, Basel, 2003, ISBN 3-7165-1308-3
- W.E. Gröger, Galerie der Sturm, Iwan Puni, Petersburg, Gemälde, Aquarelle, Zeichnungen, Berlin, Februar 1921
- André Salmon, Galerie Barbazanges, Œuvres de J. Pougni et Aquarelles de Xana Bougouslavska, Paris, 18.–30. April 1925
- Galerie Jaques Bernheim, 30 Œuvres, Paris, 16.–30. April 1928
- Galerie Jeanne Castel, Iwan Puni, Vorwort von Paul Guillaume, Paris, Juni 1933
- Galerie Louis Carré, Iwan Puni, Paris, 5. Oktober – 20. Oktober 1943
- Galerie de France, Iwan Puni, Vorwort zum Katalog von Charles Estienne, Paris, 3.–31. Mai 1947
- Galerie Knoedler, Iwan Puni, New York, 26. März – 16. April, 1949
- Adams Gallery, Jean Pougny, Vorwort zum Katalog von Alexander Watts, London, 13. April – 12. Mai 1950
- Musée National d’Art Moderne, Rétrospective Pougny, Paris, 24. Januar – 23. Februar 1958
- Musée Toulouse – Lautrec, Rétrospective Pougny, Vorwort zum Katalog von Édouard Julien und R.V. Gindertael, Albi, 29. März – 30. April 1958

=== Exhibitions ===
- St. Petersburg, Union of Youth, 1912 and 1913
- Paris, Salon des Indépendants, 1914
- St. Petersburg, Palais des Beaux Arts, Premiére Exposition Futuriste des Tableaux Tramway V, 1915
- St. Petersburg, Galerie Dobytchine, Dernière Exposition Futuriste des Tableaux 0.10, 1915
- Berlin, Galerie der Sturm, Iwan Puni, Petersburg, February, 215 Kunstwerke, 1921
- Düsseldorf, Erste Internationale Kunstausstellung, 1922
- Berlin, Große Berliner Kunstausstellung, Sektion Novembergruppe, 1922
- Paris, Salon de Tuileries, 1924
- Paris, Salon d'Automne, 1924
- Paris, Galerie Barbazanges, Œuvres de J. Pougni et Aquarelles de Xana Bougouslavska, 1925
- Brüssel, Palais des Beaux-Arts, Exposition Internationale, 1928
- Paris, Galerie Jaques Bernheim, Pougny,1928
- Paris, Galerie Jeanne Castel, Iwan Puni, Essay from Paul Guillaume, 1933, Einzelausstellung
- Paris, Galerie Charpentier, Salon des Temps Présent, 1934
- Paris, Galerie Bernheim Jeune, Exposition des Œuvres des candidates aux Prix Paul Guillaume, 1935
- Paris, Exposition Internationale, 1937
- Paris, Galerie Louis Carré, Pougny, 1943
- Paris, Musée National d'Art Moderne, Exposition Internationale d'Art Moderne organisée pas l'UNESCO, 1946
- Paris, Musée de Luxembourg, L'Art francais contemporaine, 1946
- Paris, Galerie de France, Pougny, preface from Charles Estienne, 1947
- New York, M Knoedler & Co, Jean Pougny, 1949
- Paris, Musée National d'Art Moderne, Vente aux Enchéres de Tableaux Modernes, 1950
- London, Adams Gallery, Jean Pougny, 1950
- Nice, Gallery des Ponchettes, Les Peintres par Témoins de leur Temps, 1953
- Turin, Galleria Civica d'Arte Moderna, Peintres d'Aujourd'hui France-Italie, Pougny est invité d'honneur, 1953
- Paris, Palais du Louvre, La Demeure Joyeuse – Paul Marrot et ses Amis, 1953
- London, Royal Academy, Les Peintres d'aujourd'hui d'Utrillo à Picasso, 1955
- Aix-en-Provence, Pavillon de Vendôme, Collection d'un Amateur Parisien (Collection of Madame Marie Cuttoli), 1958
- Albi, Musée Toulouse – Lautrec, Rétrospective Pougny, preface from Édouard Julien and R.V. Gindertael, 1958
- Zürich, Kunsthaus, Rétrospective Pougny, 247 œuvres, preface from René Wehrli, Gotthard Jedlicka, Werner Weber und R. V. Gindertael, 1960
- Amsterdam, Stedelijk Museum, Rétrospective Pougny, 222 œuvres, 1961
- Paris, Palais du Louvre, Collections d'Expression Française, 1962
- Turin, Galleria Civica d'Arte Moderna, Rétrospective Pougny, 297 œuvres, 1962
- Baden-Baden, Staatliche Kunsthalle, Schrift und Bild, Exposition Internationale, 1963
- Paris, Bibliothèque Nationale, Rétrospective Pougny, 1964
- New York, Metropolitan Museum of Art, Russian Stage and Costume Designs for the Ballet, Opera and Theatre, 1967
- London, Royal Academy of Arts, French Painting since 1900 from Private collections in France, 1969
- Berlin, Haus am Waldsee, Rétrospective Pougny 100 œuvres, 1975
- Leverkusen, Städtisches Museum Schloss Morsbroich, Rétrospective Pougny 100 œuvres, 1975
- Venedig, Biennale di Venezia, Ambiente / Arte dal Futurismo alla Body Art, 1977
- Paris, Centre Georges Pompidou, Paris – Berlin 1900–1933, Rapports et Contrastes, 1978
- Edinburgh, Scottish National Gallery of Modern Art, Libertad Colour and Form: Russian Non-Objective Art 1915–1922, 1978
- New York, Solomon R. Guggenheim Museum, The Planar Dimension Europe 1912–1932, 1979
- Los Angeles, Los Angeles County Museum of Art, The Avant-Garde in Russia, 1910–1930, New Perspectives, 1980
- Moscow, Galerie Tretiakov, Moscow – Paris, 1900–1930, 1981
- Frankfurt, Schirn Kunsthalle, Die große Utopie, Die Russische und Sovjet Avantgarde 1915–1932, 1992
- Basel, Kunstmuseum, TransForm, BildObjekt Skulptur im 20. Jahrhundert, 1992
- Paris, Musée d'Art Moderne de la Ville de Paris, Rétrospective Pougny, 1993
- Zürich, Kunsthaus, Chagall, Kandinsky, Malevich & Russian Avantgarde, 1999
- Basel, Fondation Beyeler, Auf der Suche nach 0.10, 2015

== See also ==
- Natalia Goncharova
- Mikhail Larionov
