= Novosilsky District =

Novosilsky District Новосильский район (Russian)
- District
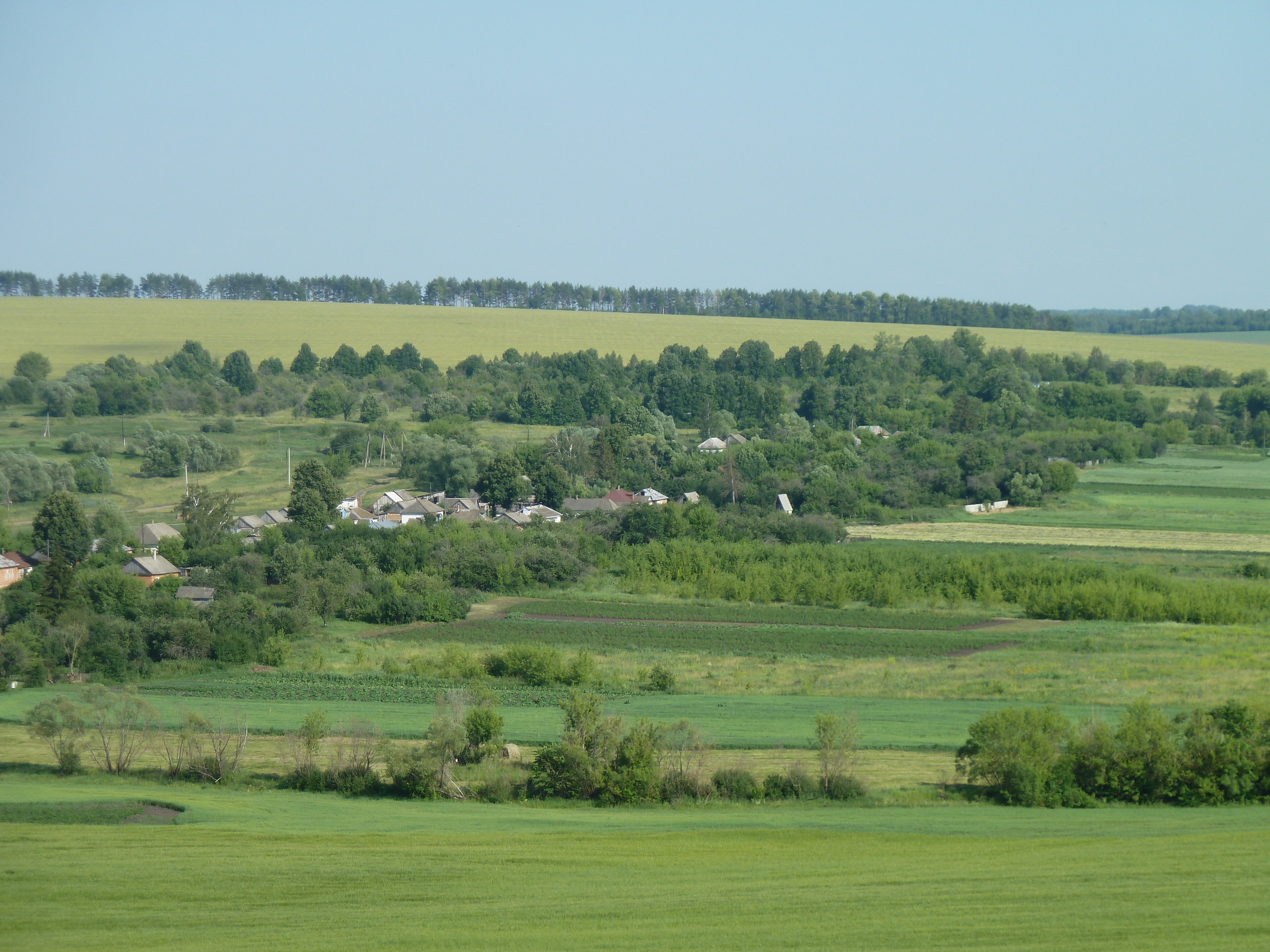
- Village in Novosilsky District

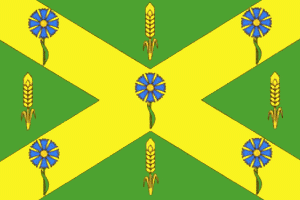
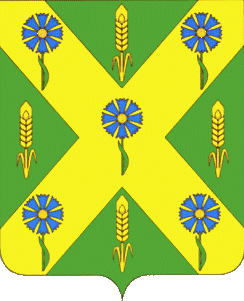
- Flag Coat of arms
- Location of Novosilsky District in Oryol Oblast
- Coordinates: 52°58′N 37°03′E
- Country: Russia
- Federal subject: Oryol Oblast
- Established: 30 July 1928
- Administrative center: Novosil

Area
  - Total: 778.3 km^{2} (300.5 sq mi)

Population (2010 Census)
  - Total: 8,561
  - Density: 11.00/km^{2} (28.49/sq mi)
  - Urban: 42.7%
  - Rural: 57.3%

Administrative structure
  - Administrative divisions: 1 Towns of district significance, 7 Selsoviets
  - Inhabited localities: 1 cities/towns, 80 rural localities

Municipal structure
  - Municipally incorporated as: Novosilsky Municipal District
  - Municipal divisions: 1 urban settlements, 7 rural settlements
- Time zone: UTC+3 (MSK)
- OKTMO ID: 54643000
- Website: http://novosilr.ru/

Novosilsky District (Russian: Новосильский райо́н) is an administrative and municipal district (raion), one of the twenty-four in Oryol Oblast, Russia. It is located in the northeast of the oblast. The area of the district is 778.3 square kilometers (300.5 sq mi). Its administrative center is the town of Novosil. Population: 8,561 (2010 Census); 10,591 (2002 census); 16,800 (1989 Soviet census). The population of Novosil accounts for 42.7% of the district's total population.
