= Liza Morozova =

Russian performance artist and art therapist

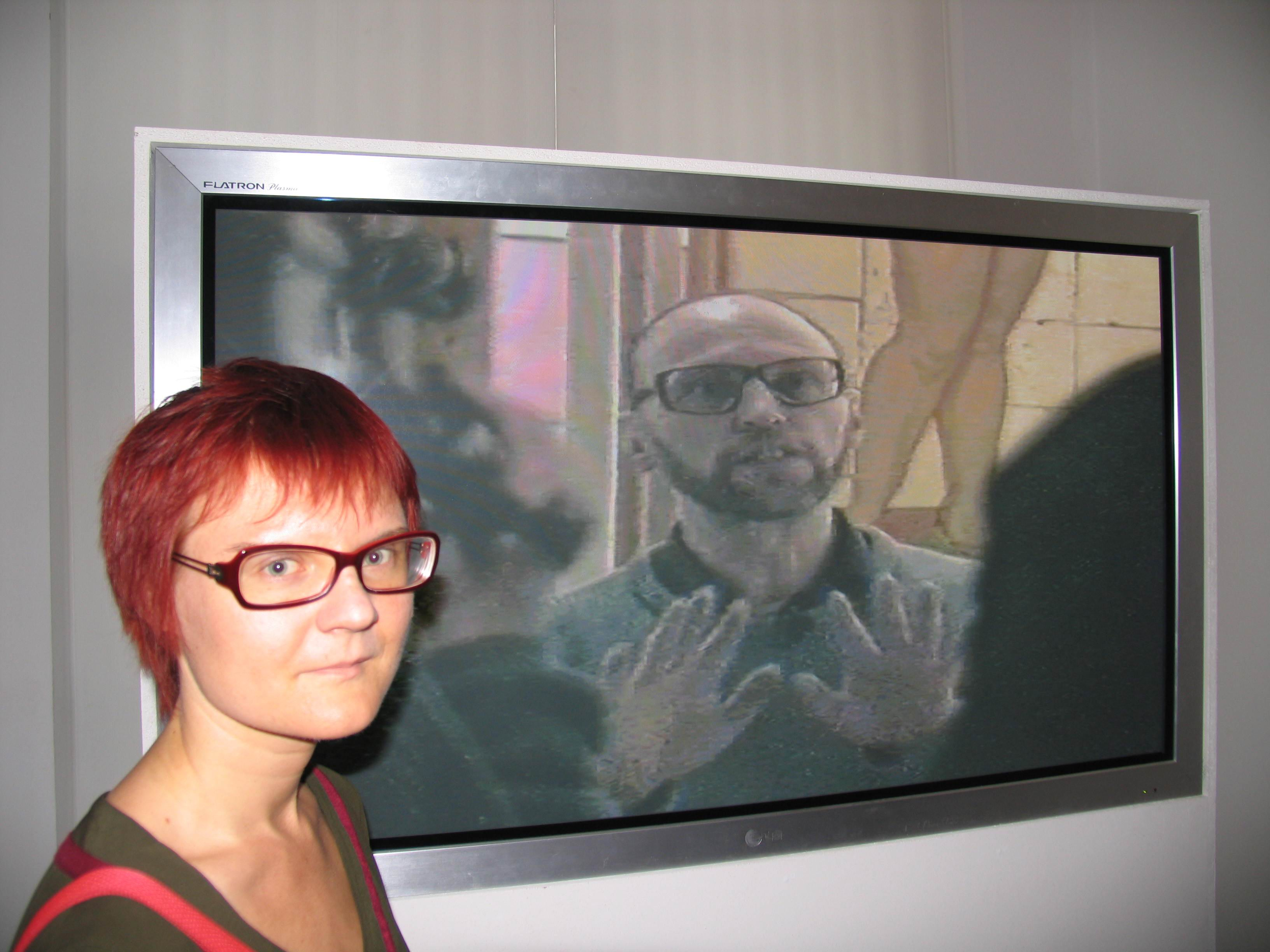
- Liza Morozova on the Retrospective of D. A. Prigov in the MMoMA, May 2008.
- Born: May 4, 1973 (age 51); Moscow, RSFSR, Soviet Union
- Education: Moscow State Pedagogical University; Saint Petersburg State Theatre Arts Academy
- Known for: Performance art, installation art, body art
- Movement: Relational art Art therapy

Líza Morózova (Russian: Лиза Морозова, Елизавета Алексеевна Морозова; born May 4, 1973) is a Russian female artist (performance art, installation art, body art), psychologist (Candidate of Sciences, PhD Level), art therapist and columnist. Participant of more than 150 international art exhibitions and biennale in 17 countries. She lives in Moscow.
