= Maya Koveshnikova =

Russian painter

- Майя Дмитриевна Ковешникова
- Born: Maya Dmitrievna Koveshnikova; 13 May 1926; Novosil, Oryol Oblast, USSR
- Died: 2 June 2013 (aged 87); Barnaul, Altai Krai, Russia
- Occupation: painter
- Years active: 1951–2010

Maya Dmitrievna Koveshnikova (Russian: Майя Дмитриевна Ковешникова, 13 May 1926 – 2 June 2013) was a Russian painter, most known for her landscapes. In 1986, she was recognized as an Honored Artist of the Russian Soviet Federative Socialist Republic. She has paintings in galleries and museums throughout Russia and in both the Russo-Japanese House of Friendship in Sapporo, Japan and the Rijksmuseum of Amsterdam, as well as other international locations.

== Early life ==
Maya Dmitrievna Koveshnikova was born on 13 May 1926 in Novosil, in the Oryol Oblast, of the Soviet Union. Her mother was a school teacher and her father was a Party worker. The family moved frequently because of her father's posts, but in 1935, she and her mother settled in the Pan'kovo village in the Novoderevenkovsky District of the Oryol Oblast. With the outbreak of World War II, just after Koveshnikova graduated from 7th grade, the area was occupied and the schools were closed. She was sent to a military training program and upon her graduation in 1942, she began teaching military instruction at the Kotovsky Elementary School, in the Novoderevenkovsky District.

In 1943, Koveshnikova joined the communist youth organization and the following year returned to school in Livny. Graduating from the 8th grade, after a year she returned as a military instructor at the Kotovsky Elementary School, where she remained for two years. In 1946, Koveshnikova chose to further her education and enrolled in the Oryol Art School in Yelets. She met fellow art student Valentin Yakovlevich Kurzin and upon completing their schooling in 1951, the couple moved to Barnaul in the Altai Krai in Siberia.

== Career ==
In 1951, Koveshnikova became a member of the Altai Artists' Union and began actively participating in local and regional exhibitions. Her earliest works depicted compositions of household life, but in the 1960s she began working on thematic paintings depicting socialist life. One such series focused on industrial still lifes, featuring laboratory objects, and were acclaimed at a regional exhibition Socialist Siberia in 1964. That same year, she was accepted as a candidate of the Artists' Union of the USSR, to which she was admitted as a full member in 1968.

From the mid-1960s, Koveshnikova had developed a picturesque style in which the main subject of her composition was located in foreground, surrounded by the landscape. Using fine, light shading and bright colors, her composed still lifes attempted to capture nature and create a "dialogue with the viewer" about the emotions stimulated by the natural environment. Beginning in the early 1970s, she began to produce a series focused on bread from Siberia. Among the works were Хлеб Алтая (Bread of Altai, 1972), К обеду комбайнеров (Lunch of Combine Workers, 1974), Хлеб, молоко, ягоды (Bread, Milk, Berries, 1974), Хлебы Кулунды (Bread of Kulunda, 1980) and Алтайский хлеб (Altaian Bread, 1981), as well as many others. Bread of Kulunda was featured in the Fifth Regional Exhibition Socialist Siberia and Altaian Bread was showcased in the Moscow exhibition Нивы Алтая (Field of Altai, 1983). After the exhibit closed Altaian Bread was made a part of the collection of Golden Russian Art of the 20th Century.

In the 1980s, Koveshnikova expanded into portraiture. Some of her works in this period included pencil drawings, such as Катя Яманова из Аноса (Katya Yamanova from Anos, 1983), Марфа Такашева (Martha Takasheva, 1984), and Девочка из Паспаула (Girl from Paspaula, 1985), while her portraits in the 1990s were more traditional or used soft elements of a grotesque style. In 1986, she was recognized as an Honored Artist of the Russian Soviet Federative Socialist Republic. In 2006, she was honored with the Demidov Foundation of the Altai Territory. In 2007 and again in 2009, Koveshnikova received the Artists' Union of Russia's Award for the Altai regional branch of the All-Russian Public Creative Organization and in 2010, she won the Altai Territory Award given to those working in the fields of architecture, art, folk art, or literature.

== Death and legacy ==
Koveshnikova died after a long illness on 2 June 2013 in Barnaul, in the Altai Krai, Russia. A tribute and exhibition to her work was hosted in the Artist's Union Exhibition Hall on 4 June. Her paintings form part of the collections of various galleries and museums throughout Russia. Internationally, her works can be found in private collections in Canada, Germany, the United Kingdom, the United States, as well as in both the Russo-Japanese House of Friendship in Sapporo, Japan and the Rijksmuseum of Amsterdam.

== Major works ==
- К зиме (For Winter, 1963)
- В химической лаборатории (In the Chemical Laboratory, 1967)
- Изба Прова из Уймона (Prow's Cabin from Uimon 1967)
- Красна изба углами (Red Hut with Corners, 1967)
- На побывку (On Leave, 1969)
- Актёльский рассвет (Aktel dawn, 1971)
- Хлеб, молоко, ягоды (Bread, milk, berries, 1974)
- Незабудки (Forget-Me-Not, 1975)
- Марьины коренья (Maryina Korenya, 1975)
- Баба Таня (Baba Tanya, 1980)
- В конце страды (The End of Suffering, 1980)
- Хлебы Кулунды (The Bread of Kulunda, 1980)
- Алтайский хлеб (Altaian Bread, 1981)
- Алтайская колыбель (Altai Cradle, 1985)
- Облепиха созрела (Ripened Sea Buckthorn, 1987)
- И пришел праздник (And the Holiday Came, 1988)
- Марьины коренья (Maryina Korenya, 2001)
- Незабудки (Forget-Me-Not, 2004)
