= Helen Gerardia =

Russian-American painter (1903–1988)

- Helen Gerardia, ca. 1956, photographed by Oliver Baker
- Born: 1903; Ekaterinoslav, Russian Empire
- Died: 1988 (aged 84–85); New York, United States
- Citizenship: United States
- Known for: Painting

Helen Gerardia (1903–1988) was a Russian-born American painter.

== Early life and education ==
She was born in Ekaterinoslav, Russian Empire in 1903. She immigrated to the United States and studied under Hans Hofmann from 1946 to 1947.

== Career ==
During her career, she painted and also engaged in lithography and etching. She eventually founded the Gerardia Workshop, where she taught a variety of mediums.

Gerardia was a member of the Vectors artist group. From 1967 until 1969, she was president of the American Society of Contemporary Artists. She exhibited her work at the Metropolitan Museum of Art, where her work was described as showing "good arrangement", and being "visually pleasing." She was called an "industrious artist", by one critic.

== Work ==
She was primarily a painter, and participated in the Abstract expressionist movement early in her career while studying under Hans Hofmann. In the early 1950s, she leaned more towards the Cubism movement. Gerardia used geometric shapes in much of her work and used the colors black and white primarily. She started incorporating more color into her paintings starting in 1959, including lavender, which renders heavily into her works of the early 1960s. She emphasized negative space frequently in her work, which was featured prominently due to her choice use of color.

== Later life and legacy ==
She died in 1988 in New York, United States.

== Notable collections ==
- "Ballerina" – 1951, oil on canvas, Smithsonian American Art Museum
