= Alexandri (amora) =

Rabbi Alexandri (Talmudic Aramaic: רבי אלכסנדרי) is the name of one or more amoraim.

According to the Jewish Encyclopedia, there were probably two amoraim of this name, living in the first and third generations of amoraim. Since their names are unaccompanied either by patronymic or cognomen;and both cultivated the field of aggadah, it is impossible to distinguish their respective teachings except in a few instances.

However, according to Aharon Heimann there was only one Alexandri, who lived in the second to third generation of amoraim. The passages in which Joshua ben Levi (first generation of amoraim) quotes Alexandri (which should indicate that Alexandri lived earlier than or contemporaneous with Joshua), Heimann argues have a corrupt text, which should be fixed to say that Alexandri quoted Joshua instead.

== Alexandri (first generation amora) ==
The following midrashim suggest that they were taught by an Alexandria who lived in the first generation of amoraim.

Two Midrashim preserve the following anecdote: Rabbi Yannai was expounding the Law, when a trader was heard inviting the people to buy an elixir of life. The people crowded about the trader. When asked, however, to exhibit the elixir, the supposed trader produced the Book of Psalms, and pointing to a passage in it, he read aloud: "Whichever man desires life and loves many days, that he may see good? Keep your tongue from evil, and your lips from speaking guile. Depart from evil, and do good; seek peace and pursue it". Elsewhere the same anecdote is related, but instead of Yannai's name, that of the trader is given as R. Alexandri. Putting the several versions of the anecdote side by side suggests that Alexandri lived contemporaneously with Yannai (i.e. in the first amoraic generation).

In the name of this R. Alexandri, R. Joshua ben Levi reports an interpretation harmonizing certain seemingly contradictory passages in the Pentateuch. In one place God commands Israel, "You shall blot out the remembrance of Amalek"; elsewhere God says: "I will utterly blot out the remembrance of Amalek from under heaven. ... Yea, a hand on the throne of Yah: the Lord will have war against Amalek from generation to generation." By the first, says Alexandri, we are to understand that, as long as Amalek lays no hand on God's throne, you must strive against him; by the second, when he lays hands on God's throne, God Himself will blot out Amalek's remembrance, waging war against him from generation to generation.

Another of R. Alexandri's interpretations reported by Joshua ben Levi suggests a Biblical support for the rabbinic law of blowing the shofar during Mussaf of Rosh Hashana, and not during the shacharit, by pointing out that the Psalmist said, "Let my sentence come forth from Your presence," only after using several terms expressive of prayer and meditation. These terms he construes as follows: "Hear the right, O Lord," represents the recital of shema (the declaration of God's unity); "Attend to my cry" - the Torah reading; "Give ear to my prayer" - that part of the service generally called Tefillah (prayer); "which I offer with unfeigned lips" - the Mussaf prayer.

The same R. Alexandri in whose name R. Huna b. Aḥa (Roba) reports this observation: Come and see how great is the influence of those who perform pious deeds: generally where the Bible uses the term hishkif a curse is implied, while when used in connection with the discharge of duty, it means blessing, as in the prayer recited after the offering of tithes, which concludes with the expression: "Look down from thy holy habitation, from heaven, and bless".

== Alexandri (third generation amora) ==
It is told that when R. Hanina ben Pappa (third generation) died, people were ready to pay him the last honors; but a pillar of fire suddenly appeared and blocked their approach to the body. At last R. Alexandri came near, and addressing the deceased, said, "Order the obstruction away, out of respect for the assembled sages"; but the deceased paid no attention to this demand, not even when requested to grant it out of respect for his own father (whose memory also would be honored by reverence shown to him). "Then do it out of respect for thyself," said R. Alexandri, whereupon the pillar disappeared. This legend, indicating the respect in which Alexandri was held, is also of chronological interest, because of its reference to Alexandri's presence at the funeral of an amora of the third generation (fourth century).

Elsewhere Alexandri reports sayings of R. Hiyya bar Abba (third generation). It is this R. Alexandri who reports some aggadot and halakhot in the name of Joshua ben Levi (first generation), and it is probably the same in whose name Rabbi Aha (fourth generation) reports.

== Teachings ==
Among the numerous homiletic observations coupled with the name of Alexandri, which may be the production of either of the two personages discussed above, are the following:

- The expression "Break thou the arm of the wicked" is applied to those who monopolize the market and raise the price of breadstuffs.
- From the redundancy in the verse "Let him take hold of my strength, that he may make peace with me: peace may he make with me," the idea is deduced that whoever applies himself to the study of God's law—which is called strength—for its own sake, effects peace both in heaven and on earth.
- The reason for calling the same heavenly visitors "men" when in Abraham's company, and "angels" when they visited Lot, is because with Abraham angels' visits were common occurrences, therefore the visitors were in his eyes only men; while to Lot—"the common man"—they were angels.
- The proverb "He that is cruel troubles his own flesh," refers to him who in times of rejoicing neglects to invite his relatives because they are poor.
- David is justified in applying to himself the term hasid (pious) because whosoever hears himself reviled and resents not, when it is in his power to resent, is a partner of God, who is blasphemed by idolaters and resents not; and since David heard himself reviled when he could resent, and did not he had the right to call himself hasid.
- With reference to the Psalmist's saying, "A broken and a contrite heart, O God, you will not despise," R. Alexandri remarks, "When a common man uses a broken vessel he is ashamed of it, but not so with the Holy One. All the instruments of His service are broken vessels." "The Lord is close to them that are of a broken heart"; "He heals the broken in heart"; "A broken and a contrite heart, O God, you will not despise" therefore, Hosea exhorts the Israelites, saying "O Israel, return to the Lord your God; for you have stumbled by your iniquity".

== Other Alexandris ==
Two Alexandris, one of whom is surnamed "b. Haggai" (or Hadrin) and the other "karobah" (the liturgical poet), the former reporting a homiletic observation in the name of the latter, are also mentioned. Their relation to the two Alexandris of this article must be a matter of conjecture only.
