= Novosil =

Town in Oryol Oblast, Russia

Novosil Новосиль
- Town
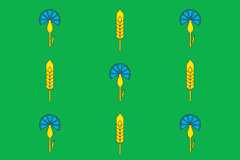
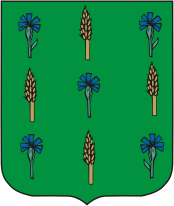
- Flag Coat of arms
- Interactive map of Novosil
- Location of Novosil Novosil (Oryol Oblast)
- Coordinates: 52°58′N 37°03′E
- Country: Russia
- Federal subject: Oryol Oblast
- Administrative district: Novosilsky District
- Town of district significanceSelsoviet: Novosil
- First mentioned: 1155
- Town status since: 1777
- Elevation: 220 m (720 ft)

Population (2010 Census)
  - Total: 3,658
  - Estimate (2025): 2,847 (−22.2%)

Administrative status
  - Capital of: Novosilsky District, town of district significance of Novosil

Municipal status
  - Municipal district: Novosilsky Municipal District
  - Urban settlement: Novosil Urban Settlement
  - Capital of: Novosilsky Municipal District, Novosil Urban Settlement
- Time zone: UTC+3 (MSK)
- Postal code: 303500
- OKTMO ID: 54643101001

Novosil (Russian: Новоси́ль) is a town and the administrative center of Novosilsky District in Oryol Oblast, Russia, located on the right bank of the Zusha River 70 kilometers (43 mi) east of Oryol, the administrative center of the oblast. Population: 3,658 (2010 census); 4,017 (2002 census); 4,198 (1989 Soviet census).

== History ==
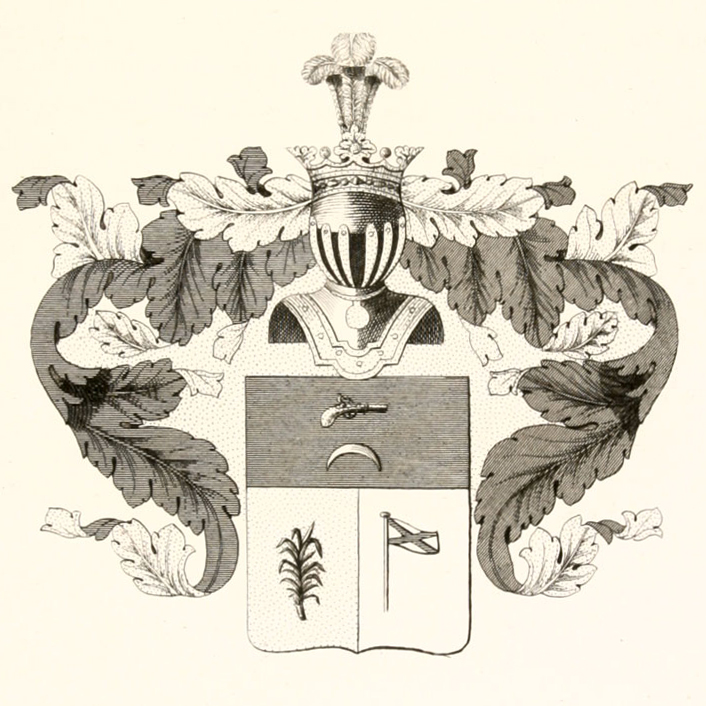
Coat of arms of Novosilsky family (1836), an old Russian nobility claiming descent from Rurik dynasty

It was first mentioned in 1155 as a fortress called Itil and was the seat of the Olgovichi branch of the Rurik dynasty during the Middle Ages. Town rights were granted to Novosil in 1777. During World War II, Novosil was occupied by the German Army from November 13 to December 27, 1941.

== Administrative and municipal status ==
Within the framework of administrative divisions, Novosil serves as the administrative center of Novosilsky District. As an administrative division, it is incorporated within Novosilsky District as the town of district significance of Novosil. As a municipal division, the town of district significance of Novosil is incorporated within Novosilsky Municipal District as Novosil Urban Settlement.

== Notable people ==
- Maya Dmitrievna Koveshnikova (1926–2013), landscape painter
- Slava Polunin (born 1950), performance artist
