= Ida Nappelbaum =

Russian photographer

Ida Moiseevna Nappelbaum (Russian: Ида Моисеевна Наппельбаум; 1900–1992) was a Soviet writer and photographer.

Her work is included in the collection of the Museum of Fine Arts Houston, the Museum Folkwang in Essen, Germany and the Pushkin Museum.
