= Anastasia Khoroshilova =

Russian photographer (born 1978)

- Born: 1978 (age 47–48); Moscow, Russian SFSR, Soviet Union
- Education: University of Duisburg-Essen
- Known for: Photography

Anastasia Khoroshilova (Russian: Анастасия Хорошилова; born 1978) is an artist and arts educator working primarily with portrait photography. She was a lecturer at the Rodchenko Art School in Moscow (2012–2017). Khoroshilova is currently based between both Moscow and Berlin.

== Education and Career ==
Anastasia Khoroshilova studied photography at the University of Duisburg-Essen in Germany.

She was awarded an Ellen Auerbach Stipendium at the Akademie der Künste Berlin in 2010. In 2012 she started lecturing for "Project Photography" at the Rodchenko Moscow School of Photography and Multimedia, Rodchenko Art School.

Khoroshilova's monographic book was published by Berlin-based publishing house Hatje Cantz. in 2014.

In 2016 she became a member of "Deutsche Fotografische Akademie", the German Academy of Photography. She is a member of "The Russian Union of Art Photographers" since 1997. Khoroshilova's work is featured in the collection of Pérez Art Museum Miami, Florida.

== Exhibitions (selection) ==
Anastasia Khoroshilova's institutional presentations include

- 2006 Anastasia Khoroshilova: Notes on the Way, State Russian Museum (solo show)
- 2008 Russkie, Museum Moderner Kunst, Moscow
- 2008 Anastasia Khoroshilova: Exercises, Stella Art Foundation, Moscow
- 2011 Starie Novosti (Old News), Venice Biennale, Italy
- 2011 Starie Novosti (Old News), Hilger Contemporary, Vienna, Austria
- 2012 Starie Novosti (Old News), Kunsthaus Baselland, Switzerland
- 2014 Maison Européenne de Photographie, Paris
