= Nadya Rusheva =

Russian painter

- Born: Nadezhda Nikolayevna Rusheva; 31 January 1952; Ulaanbaatar, Mongolia
- Died: March 6, 1969 (aged 17); Moscow, Russia
- Resting place: Pokrov Cemetery, Moscow, Russia
- Occupation: Artist
- Years active: 1957–1969
- Known for: Drawings

Nadya (Nadezhda Nikolayevna) Rusheva (Russian: Надя (Надежда Николаевна) Рушева) (31 January 1952 - 6 March 1969) was a Russian artist. Having started drawing from the age of five, she had created over 10,000 artworks before dying at the age of 17.

== Biography ==
=== Career ===
Nadya Rusheva began drawing around the age of 5. It wasn't until she was 7, though, that her family began to take her artistic endeavors seriously. She began to paint every day, and once drew 36 illustrations of “The Tale of Tsar Saltan” in a single evening while her father read the story to her. Rusheva reportedly made no preparatory drawings or sketches, nor even erased much. According to the artist herself, “I live the life of those I draw. I first see them... they appear on paper as watermarks, and I need to do something to lead around them...” She brought her characters to life in clean, flowing lines. Rusheva is most famous for her illustrations of Mikhail Bulgakov’s Master and Margarita. Originally banned in the Soviet Union, the book contains two parallel stories: the story of Master and Margarita and the story of Jesus Christ’s final days as written by the Master. Rusheva’s illustrations of Margarita are said to bear a strong resemblance to Bulgakov’s wife, whom Rusheva never met. Yelena Bulgakova later said, “I wish I knew this amazing and subtle creature, Nadya Rusheva."

=== Death and legacy ===
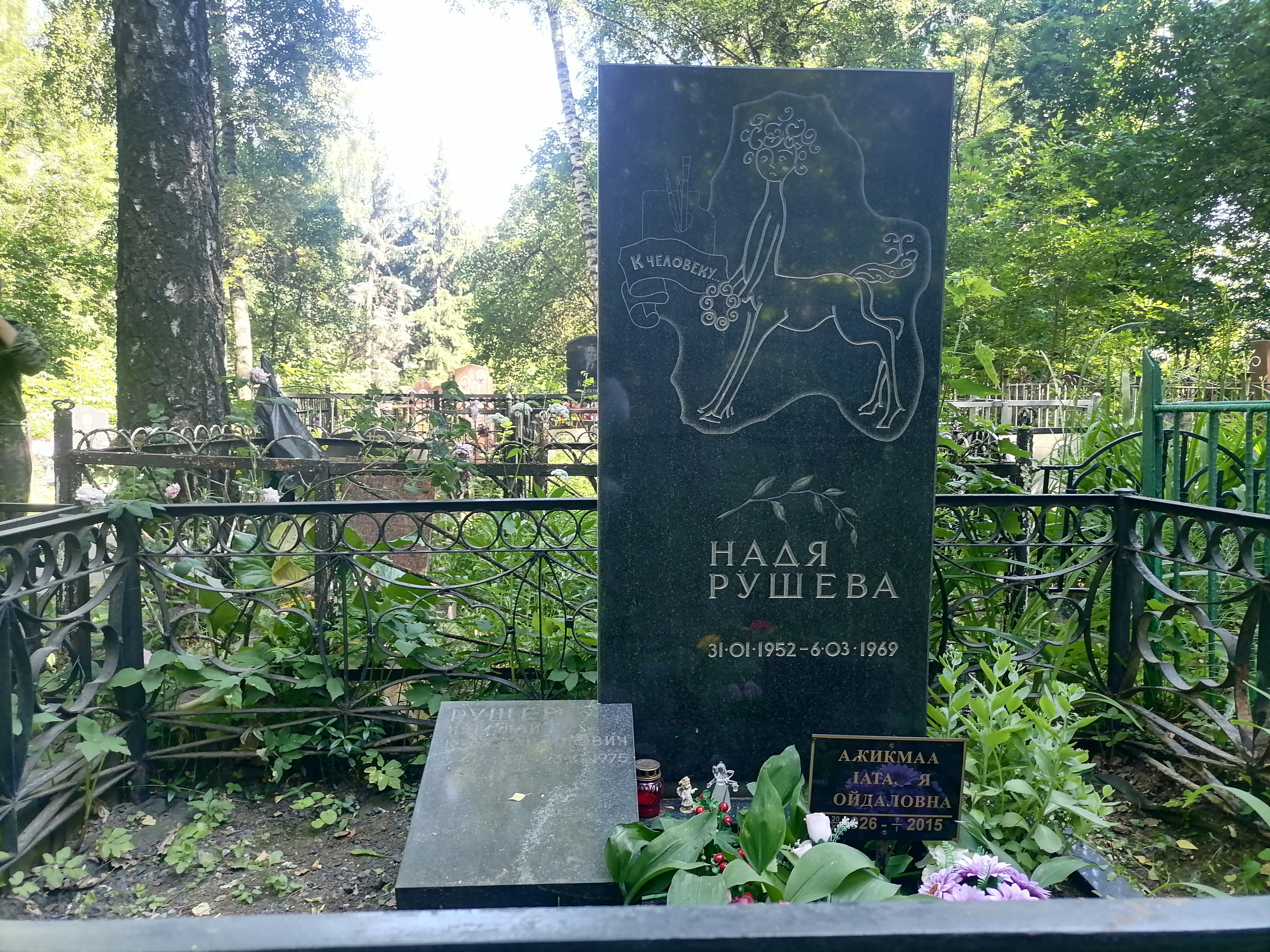
Grave of Nadya Rusheva and her father at Pokrov Cemetery

She died from a brain haemorrhage resulting from a congenital defect of the cerebral arteries on 6 March 1969. Nadya was buried at Pokrov Cemetery in Moscow.

Asteroid 3516 Rusheva is named after Nadya.
