= Sara Alexandri =

Russian artist (1913–1993)

- Born: 22 October 1913; Kherson, Russian Empire (now Ukraine)
- Died: 28 April 1993 (aged 79); St Leonards-on-Sea, East Sussex, England
- Education: Royal Institute d'Arte, Florence; Royal Academy of Fine Arts
- Known for: Painter

Sara Alexandri (22 October 1913 – 28 April 1993) was a Russian-born artist known for her oil paintings who, after training in Italy, spent the majority of her career in England.

== Biography ==
Alexandri was born in Kherson, then part of the Russian Empire, and was educated in Palestine. She studied art in Florence, initially at the Royal Institute d'Arte between 1936 and 1940 and then, after the Second World War, at the Royal Academy of Fine Arts during 1946 and 1947. Living in England, first at Bath, then at St Leonards-on-Sea, Alexandri exhibited oil paintings and watercolours of landscapes, flowers and figure subjects at numerous venues in Britain and abroad. These included the Royal Academy in London, with the Royal Society of British Artists, the Women's International Art Club and at the Royal West of England Academy in Bristol and at the Paris Salon.

Alexandri married Michael Perkins, and they lived in St Leonards-on-Sea. She died there on 28 April 1993, at the age of 79.
