= Kseniya Boguslavskaya =

Russian painter (1892–1972)

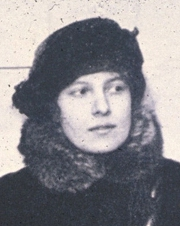
Kseniya Boguslavskaya attending the 0.10 Exhibition

Velemir Khlebnikov Reads Poetry to Kseniya Boguslavskaya by Ivan Puni, 1915

Kseniya or Xenia Leonidovna Boguslavskaya (Note: Russian: Ксе́ния Леони́довна Богусла́вская.) (née Bogoslovskaya), (Note: Russian: Богосло́вская.) also known as Xana Puni (5 February [O.S. 24 January] 1892 — 3 May 1972), was a Russian avant-garde artist (Futurist, Suprematist), illustrator and scenic designer. She was the wife of the painter Ivan Puni.

== Early life in Russia ==
She was born in Odessa as Kseniya Bogoslovskaya. Her father, Leonid Ivanovich Bogoslovsky (1 January 1854 — 22 July 1902), was a lieutenant colonel of the Russian Army and served from 1898 to 1902 in Guangdong, China, where he died of dysentery. Her mother, Vera Fedorovna Bogoslovskaya (née Alabugina; 26 April 1858 – 16 August 1921), the daughter of a lieutenant, followed him, and after her husband's death, she went with Xana and her elder brother to Saint Petersburg and lived off a military pension. Kseniya studied from 1903 to 1908 at the Therese von Oldenburg Female School. For her drawing lessons, she went to the Imperial Academy of Arts. In 1908, she got acquainted with Ivan Puni, her future partner.

From 1909 to 1910, she participated in illegal political activities. Fearing persecution, she married a certain Kolosov and left Russia with him, first to Galicia, including Lemberg and the Carpathians, then to Vienna, and from there to Naples. In Naples, she entered the Academy of Fine Arts. There she also met Ivan Puni and moved with him to Paris in March 1912. Soon afterward, Ivan left for Russia, and Bogoslavskaya attended Parisian public schools (l'Académie russe and Académie de la Grande Chaumière) until May 1913. She then returned to Saint Petersburg with the surname Boguslavskaya.

In Saint Petersburg, she joined Puni (they married officially only in February 1920) and their flat became a meeting point for the Russian Futurists for the next six months. Velimir Khlebnikov was deeply impressed by her and her stories from Galicia. Boguslavskaya supported Ivan in all of his activities, including the preparation of the collection "Roaring Parnassus" (1913), the organization of the exhibitions Tramway V (March 1915) and 0,10 (December 1915), and the decoration of Petrograd for the revolutionary holidays (May and November 1918). In 1919, they went to Vitebsk in order to teach at the art school founded by Marc Chagall, staying there from January to April.

== Berlin ==
In February 1920, Boguslavskaya, Puni, and the Shukhayevs escaped from Soviet Russia, travelling across the frozen ice of the Gulf of Finland. They lived in Berlin from 1920 to 1923, where she worked as a scene designer for the Russian-German cabaret called Der Blaue Vogel and for the Russian Romantic Theatre. In Berlin, they established ties with the International Futurists, including poet Ruggero Vasari and Kārlis Zāle.

== Paris ==
At the end of 1923, they moved to Paris. Boguslavskaya again took care of the finances as a costume designer and fabric designer until Puni gradually achieved fame as a painter. She was also active as art dealer, but above all, she was committed to Puni's work. After his death on 28 December 1956, she organized around 20 retrospective exhibitions of Puni and prepared material for his catalogue of works, which was published in 1972 (1st volume) and 1992 (2nd volume). In 1959–1960 and 1966, she donated a total of 62 works by Puni (paintings and graphic works) to the French state.

Boguslavskaya died on 3 May 1972 in Herblay-sur-Seine, near Paris.

== Selected exhibition ==
- 1915. Last Futurist Exhibition of Paintings 0.10, Dobychina Gallery, St. Petersburg
- 1922. First Russian Art Exhibition, Berlin.
- 2002. The Russian Avant-Garde Book 1910–1934. Museum of Modern Art, NYC.

== Collections ==
Boguslavskaya's works are in permanent collections of the State Russian Museum in St. Petersburg and the Tretyakov Gallery in Moscow.
