= Olga and Galina Chichagova =

Russian graphic artists

The sisters Galina Dmitrievna Chichagova (Russian: Галина Дмитриевна Чичагова; 1891–1966) and Olga Dmitrienva Chichagova (Russian: Ольга Дмитриевна Чичагова; 1886–1958) were Russian graphic artists known especially for children's book illustration. They collaborated through their entire careers, and most of their published work is attributed to the both of them.

== Life and family ==
The Chichagova sisters were part of a well-known family dynasty of Moscow architects. Their father, Dmitrii Chichagov, designed the historic Moscow City Hall building on Red Square, among others, and their paternal grandfather, Nikolai Chichagov, designed the Cathedral of Christ the Saviour and Grand Kremlin Palace in Moscow.

Both sisters studied in the Stroganov Arts Academy (currently called the Stroganov Moscow State Academy of Arts and Industry) from 1911 to 1917. In 1920, they continued their education in the famous Higher Art and Technical Studios Vkhutemas, which was home to a number of well-known artists in the Constructivist school. They themselves identified as Constructivists, and their book art strongly reflects this aesthetic.

== Works ==
Cover of "Путешествие Чарли" ("Charlie's Travels," 1924), illustrated by Olga and Galina Chichagova.

The Chichagova sisters' most well-known illustrated book is Charlie's Travels (Russian: Путешествие Чарли, 1923), with a text by Nikolai Smirnov (whose work they illustrated frequently).

Their illustrated works (all in Russian) include:

- Путешествие Чарли (Charlie's Travels; 1923)
- Откуда посуда (Where Dishes Are From; 1923)
- Детям о газете (To Children about the Newspaper; 1923)
- Что из чего (What Comes from What)
- Как люди ездят (How People Go; 1925)
- Для чего Красная армия (What the Red Army Is For; 1926)
- Почему не было баранок (Why There Were No Bagels; 1926)
- Каждый делает своё дело (Everyone Does Their Own Thing; 1927)
- Далеко да близко (Far Yet Near; 1927)
- Егор-монтёр (Yegor the Fitter; 1928)
- Поедем (Let's Go; 1929)
- Советская игрушка (A Soviet Toy; 1932)
- Борьба с бездорожьем (The Fight with Roadlessness; 1932)
- Музей детской книги (The Museum of Children's Books; 1933–1934)
- Питание (Food; 1934)

== Criticism ==
Contemporary children's book professionals appreciated the Chichagova sisters' artistic style, and especially its stylized depictions of industrial tools and outputs:

The drawings in these books have a particular figurative character: something from the drawings of the tools of production and the things produced by these tools. Their subject is interpreted on the large scale of the entire production, not focusing too closely on the details, and without going into particular details. Hence the style of these books and drawings: they are very clever schemes of the branches of civilization. (From a 1926 Russian periodical on recent children's books, as cited in the memoirs of Nina Simonovich-Efimova.)

Later critics have also noted Chichagovas's celebration of industrial objects, even at the expense of figures recognizable in the popular culture of the time: for example, in Charlie's Travels, rather than take advantage of the beloved and easily recognizable figure of Charlie Chaplin, they instead chose to foreground his various means of transportation.

These later critics have also identified a change in the Chichagova's style:

Returning again to their beloved theme of transportation in the 1929 albom Let's Go (Russian: Поедем), the artists avoid their previous schematicism: machines become three-dimensional, and the people sitting in them cease to be mere symbols; the illustrators are interested not only in the general outlines of objects, but also in the details of their construction.
