= Vasilisk Gnedov =

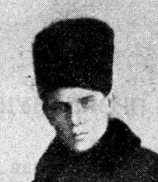
V. I. Gnedov

Vasily Ivanovich Gnedov (Russian: Васи́лий Ива́нович Гне́дов, IPA: [vɐˈsʲilʲɪj ɪˈvanəvʲɪdʑ ˈɡnʲedəf]), better known by the pen name Vasilisk Gnedov (Russian: Васили́ск Гне́дов, IPA: [vəsʲɪˈlʲizɡ ˈɡnʲedəf]; 3 March 1890 — November 20, 1978), was one of the most radically experimental poets of Russian Futurism, though not as prolific as his peers.

Gnedov is chiefly known for his Poem of the End, which consisted of its title alone on a blank page, and which the poet performed on stage using a silent gesture. The collection from which it came, Death to Art (1913), contained fifteen very short poems that gradually reduced in size from one line, to one word, one letter, and ultimately to Poem of the End. The poem has been compared to Kazimir Malevich's painting Black Square (1915), John Cage’s silent composition 4'33" (1952), and to Minimalism in general.

Although part of the Ego-Futurist group, Gnedov’s poetry was much closer in style to the better-known Hylaea or Cubo-Futurist group, which included Velimir Khlebnikov, Vladimir Mayakovsky, and Aleksei Kruchenykh. His other works were characterised by experimental language (including zaum-like neologisms), the use of colloquial, dialect, and Ukrainian words, and a defiant and strident lyric subject. Numerous incidents reported in the Russian press in 1913–14 earned Gnedov the reputation of being a scandal-monger. However, his stated intent at the time was “to invert and renew literature, to show new paths”.

Illness, military service in World War I, shellshock from fighting in the Revolution, and political repression in the 1930s, virtually silenced him. After his release from Soviet camps in 1956, Gnedov continued to write but was not published again before his death in 1978. Contemporary avant-garde poets such as Serge Segay (who has written about Gnedov and published his work) and Rea Nikonova regard him as an important forerunner of and contributor to Russian Modernism.
