= Universal War =

1916 poetry book by A. Kruchenykh

Universal War, by Aleksei Kruchenykh, 1916

Universal War (Russian: ВсеЛенская Война Ъ) is an artist's book by Aleksei Kruchenykh published in Petrograd at the beginning of 1916. Despite being produced in an edition of 100 of which only 12 are known to survive, the book has become one of the most famous examples of Russian Futurist book production, and is considered a seminal example of avant-garde art from the beginning of the twentieth century.

Published at the height of Russian involvement in World War I (see Gorlice-Tarnów Offensive), the book attempts to echo the chaos and destruction of the war with the chaos and disruption of collage techniques new to the Russian Avant-Garde at the time, and opens with the bleak prophecy "Universal War will take place in 1985". Shortly after the book was published, Kruchenykh left Petrograd to live in a hut in the Caucasus to avoid the draft.

"One of the most outstanding merits of the album- a dadaist work in the fullest sense- is its successful realization of Kruchenykh's concept of collage as an artistic method transcending mere technique and capable of metaphorically expressing the 'discordant concordance' of the age."

The book is an early attempt to link zaum poetry (often translated as 'transrational' or 'beyonsense' poetry) with 'zaum' images. In the foreword, Kruchenykh refers to the book as 'Poetic zaum shaking the hand of the pictorial zaum'.

Universal War is often erroneously credited as a collaboration between Kruchenykh and his wife, the artist Olga Rozanova. Whilst the pair often collaborated on artist's books-including A Game In Hell (1914) and Transrational Boog (1915)- most authorities now consider the work to be by Kruchenykh alone. A series of similar collages – also credited to Kruchenykh – in the book 1918 was published in Tiflis (Tbilisi) in January or February 1917, whilst Rozanova was still in Moscow and the Verbovka Village Folk Centre working for Malevich and, later, Izo Narkompros.

== The emergence of Russian futurist books ==
Destruction Of Gardens, Collage #6 of Universal War, 1916

Kruchenykh had been a member of the Gileia poets' group in Moscow that had published A Slap In the Face of Public Taste, a manifesto/provocation, an early Succès de scandale that helped to establish Futurism in Russia. He left Gileia in 1912 to join the rival Donkey's Tail group, which was founded by the Cubo-Futurist painter Mikhail Larionov. Each of the members would collaborate with Kruchenykh on his next three artist's books; A Game In Hell, Worldbackwards and Old-Time Love. These three publications set the tone for a radical deconstruction of the book format:

"If Kruchenykh had consciously set out to dismantle (nowadays we might say "deconstruct") the legacy of Johannes Gutenberg, it is unlikely that he could have done it more completely....In a series of remarkable book works of 1912 to 1920, Kruchenykh and his collaborators challenged this legacy in an unprecedentedly complete way, step-by-step departing from our European expectations about what a twentieth century book should be," (Gerald Janecek, quoted in The Russian Avant-Garde Book)

== Universal War in Russian literature ==
Universal War was an atypical book for Kruchenykh, since despite training as an artist, he usually only supplied the poetry for his books. This allowed collaborating artists such as Natalya Goncharova, Kazimir Malevich and Olga Rozanova unusual levels of freedom to integrate their pictures with his hand-written words. Universal War featured his own collages, in an abstract style Kruchenykh referred to as 'Non-Objective'. The series of collages run parallel to the poetry printed on the first two sheets. Germany is depicted as a belligerent spiky helmet with its shadow, a black panther, fighting Russia.

The book starts with two pages of poems, under the headline "Universal War will take place in 1985" with page references to associate them with specific images. These poems are followed by 12 related collages, consisting of coloured sheets of card-mostly dark blue, but interspersed with grey, white and pink sheets- with various other papers and fabrics stuck to the sheets. Whilst the copies are similar, they show subtle differences.

=== Poetic and pictorial Zaum ===
Explosion of a Trunk, Collage #3 of Universal War, 1916, from the edition in MOMA NY

Alternative copy of Explosion of a Trunk, from the Costakis Collection

Zaum poetry attempted to “…lead the artist far beyond the restraints of socially sanctioned patterns and the vice of national vocabularies" and, whilst similar to Marinetti's insistence on the concrete nature of words, Kruchenykh insisted that Zaum was a liberation from meaning as well as form.

[Kruchenykh] described the new logic of zaum as ‘broader than sense’, a logic that liberated words, letters and sounds from their ‘submission to meaning’ as defined by conventional three-dimensional logic.

The poems are short, and are filled with onomatopeiac syllables;

Page 2—Battle Between Mars and Scorpio

appetite pegasus
appendicitus
grabz
chachen
respact
herself
female
tuningfork

Page 3—Explosion of a Trunk

with the queue full of whips
cuts the stone with vengeance
hil ble faes
och fi ge

In the preface Kruchenykh claimed that the collages were born of the same source as transrational language- 'the liberation of creation from unnecessary conveniences (through non-objectiveness)'. He cited the style as originating with Rozanova, and taken up by Malevich under 'the rather uninformative name' of Suprematism. In fact, the Russian avant-garde were well aware of Kandinsky's experiments with Abstract art. Kandinsky, a Russian living in Munich, regularly returned to Russia, and had contributed to A Slap In The Face Of Public Taste with a poem from Klänge, an artist's book of sound poetry placed in tandem with abstract woodcuts, published in Munich, 1912. Another seminal artist's book, La prose du Transsibérien et de la Petite Jehanne de France by Blaise Cendrars and another Russian, Sonia Delaunay, had been exhibited in Russia in late 1913, and similarly linked colourful abstract images with concrete poetry.

The work pre-dates Hans Arp's similar experiments with abstract collages done for the Cabaret Voltaire, an early Dada venue, although it's not known if the two men were aware of each other's works.

=== Exile ===
Unlike the Italian futurists, the attitude of the Russian futurists to the war and the Russian Revolution were at best ambiguous- Kruchenykh, like Kamensky, dodged the draft by retiring to a wooden hut in the Caucasus sometime in 1916. By 1917, he had moved to the newly independent (if short-lived), menshevik-controlled Democratic Republic of Georgia, and became a member with Ilia Zdanevich and Igor' Terent'ev of the avant-garde group 41°, centered at the Fantastic Cavern, an underground cabaret in downtown Tiflis. The scattering of artists during the revolution effectively brought Cubo-Futurism to an end, to be replaced by constructivism.

There are copies of Universal War in MOMA, New York, and in the Costakis collection.
