= Larissa Shmailo =

American poet, translator, novelist, editor, and critic

Larissa Shmailo (born 1956 in Brooklyn, New York, United States) is an American poet, translator, novelist, editor, and critic. She is known for her literary translations from Russian to English, particularly her translation of Victory over the Sun and the anthology Twenty-First Century Russian Poetry.

Shmailo is an experimentalist and a neoformalist, as well as a spoken word artist. She translated the first Futurist opera, Victory over the Sun, at the age of twenty-two, but began her literary career in earnest in 1993 in New York City's open mike poetry scene as curator of the reading series Sliding Scale Poetry. She went on from there to win recognition as a poet, translator, novelist, anthologist, editor, and critic in Russia, India, and across the United States.

== Literary work ==
=== Victory over the Sun ===
Shmailo was the original English-language translator of Victory over the Sun by Aleksei Kruchenykh for the Los Angeles County Museum of Art's celebrated reconstruction of the first Futurist opera and performance piece in 1980. This translation was additionally used for productions at the Garage Museum of Contemporary Art, the Brooklyn Academy of Fine Arts, the American Museum of Natural History, the Smithsonian, the Brooklyn Academy of Music, and theaters and universities worldwide. In 2015, it was featured at the Cornelia Street Café with poet-actor Bob Holman in the role of The Time Traveler and was part of the Garage Museum of Moscow's 2014 retrospective of Russian performative art. The opera received a high-tech full restaging with digital sets and synthesized music at Boston University on April 23, 2015.

=== Poetry books and CDs ===
Shmailo's poetry collections are Medusa's Country (MadHat Press 2017), #specialcharacters (Unlikely Books 2014), In Paran (BlazeVOX [books] 2009) and the chapbooks A Cure for Suicide (Červená Barva Press 2006) and Fib Sequence (Argotist Ebooks 2011) Her poetry CDs are The No-Net World (2006) and Exorcism (2009) (CDBaby).

=== Twenty-first Century Russian poetry ===
Shmailo edited the free online anthology of ultra-contemporary Russian poetry, Twenty-first Century Russian Poetry. The anthology, which appeared in the online poetry omnibus Big Bridge in 2013, has been disseminated internationally via social media and e-mail.

=== Patient Women, a novel ===
Shmailo's debut novel, called "a brutally honest wrestling match of truth-telling and sex" and "the best book . . . about this period of life in NYC since Patti Smith's Just Kids," was published by BlazeVOX Books in July 2015. The work is a semiautobiographical bildungsroman about sex and substance addiction in the Woodstock and punk rock eras and the early days of AIDS, and features a transgender leading character. Chapters deal with prostitution, incest, and the Holocaust.

=== Sly Bang ===
Sly Bang is an experimental science fiction non-linear novel, including prose and poetry, that pits Shmailo's alter ego, “Larissa Ekaterina Anastasia Nikolayevna Romanova, tsaritsa of all the Russias,” against an “army of serial killers, mad scientists, and ultrarich sociopaths.” Critics cite its "humor, ebullient psychosexualism, and quasi-hypothetical political scenarios."

=== Anthologies ===
Shmailo's work has appeared in the anthologies Measure for Measure: An Anthology of Poetic Meters (Penguin Random House), Words for the Wedding (Penguin Books), Contemporary Russian Poetry (Dalkey Archive Press), Resist Much/Obey Little: Poems for the Inaugural (Spuyten Duyvil Publishing), Women Write Resistance: Poets Resist Gender Violence (Wiseman Publishing), The Unbearables Big Book of Sex (Autonomedia). From Somewhere to Nowhere: The End of the American Dream (The Unbearables). Verde que te quiero verde: Poems after Federico Garcia Lorca (Pederson). About: Poetry/About.com Spring Poems 2007 Anthology, and the Occupy Wall Street Poetry Anthology, among others.

=== Journals ===
Shmailo has been published in literary journals including Brooklyn Rail, Fulcrum, Plume, Journal of Feminist Studies in Religion, The Common, St. Petersburg Review, Gargoyle, Barrow Street, Drunken Boat, FULCRUM, Rattapallax, Journal of Poetics Research, Eoagh, Eco-Poetry, Eleven Eleven, Atlanta Review, Lungfull!, MiPoesias, and The Journal of Interdimensional Poetry.

=== Conference presentations ===
Shmailo has presented at the Conference of the Association of Writers and Writing Programs several times, presenting "Daughters of Baba Yaga: The Eastern European Woman Poet in the United States" and "Translation from Pushkin to Pussy Riot" in 2015, "Endangered Music: Formal Poetry in the 21st Century" in 2016, and "The Semi-formal: Hybrid Free and Formal Verse" in 2018. In 2019, she presented "The Critical Creative: The Editor-Poet" and "Hybrid Sex Writing: What's Your Position?".

In 2012, Shmailo presented on Jung's Red Book at the Art and Psyche Conference at New York University. She was a guest on PennSound for its "Cross-Cultural Communications" program in 2015, and presented on her work at the 2015 performance of Victory over the Sun at Boston University.

=== Critical writing ===
Shmailo has written on Daniil Kharms, Bob Holman, Annie Finch, Elaine Equi, Philip Nikolayev, and other poets and writers for the Journal of Poetics Research, The Battersea Review, The Brooklyn Rail, and Jacket.

=== Additional translations ===
Shmailo has been a translator on the Russian Bible for the American Bible Society.

== Activism ==
=== HOWL (Humanities Opposition World League) ===
Shmailo is the co-founder, with Alice Sieve, of HOWL, an international anti-fascist collective of artists and scholars. Shmailo wrote the manifesto for the group and serves as editor for HOWL publications. The collective was founded on Election Day, 2016.

=== The Feminist Poets in Low-Cut Blouses ===
Shmailo founded the irreverent poetry organization of “men, women, and others” in 1993. The group performs regularly at The New York City Poetry Festival and at venues throughout New York City.

== Critical reception ==
Mohammad Mostaghimi, an Iranian poet who lives in Isfahan, has translated some of her poems into Persian.

Jeff Hansen, writing for Altered Scale, praised Shmailo's book In Paran. He contrasted the erotic love poems in the first section of the book to the disillusioning poems of the later sections.

Chris Campanioni praised Shmailo's book #specialcharacters and its anti-capitalism themes in the Brooklyn Rail, placing it between Millennials thought and Language poetry.

Bernard Meisler, writing for Sensitive Skin, named Shmailo's book Medusa's Country one of its Best of 2017, praising the book's smart truth-telling.

Writing for Lit Pub, Dean Kostos thoroughly analyzed Medusa's Country, discussing its "prosody and nuanced rhymes," as well as how the author's personal life and her "bouts with mental illness, mania, and deleterious behaviors" inspire her work.

In Compulsive Reader, Michael T. Young praised Medusa's Country for its intelligence, subtlety, and experience.

RW Spryszak, writing for Ragazine, discussed what he sees as the failure of most experimental writing. He holds up Shmailo's novel Sly Bang as a success of the genre that offers "an assembly line of literary riches."

== Personal life ==
Shmailo is the daughter of Sinaida and Nikolai Shmailo, who emigrated to the United States in 1950 from Ukraine via the displaced persons camps of World War II after internment in the Mittelbau-Dora (Dora Nordhausen) concentration camp. Shmailo has recorded her parents' experience in her poem, "How My Family Survived the Camps" and in fictionalized form in her novel, Patient Women.

Shmailo was educated at New York City's Hunter College High School, The American School in Switzerland, and Barnard College (1979), although episodes of mental illness and substance abuse interrupted her studies. She was married in 1985 to Steven Charles Werner, who drowned on the couple's honeymoon, as recounted in Shmailo's poem "Death at Sea." Her second and third marriages to Hans Goldfuss in 1988 and Eric Yost in 2000 ended in divorce.

Shmailo has written extensively about her history with bipolar disorder, cross-addictions, and prostitution, particularly in her poem, "autobio," her novel, Patient Women, and her book of poetry, Medusa's Country.

== Bibliography ==
- Dora/Lora. Unlikely Books (2023)
- Writing Resilience Workbook. Patient Woman Press (2021)
- Sly Bang. Spuyten Duyvil (2018)
- Medusa's Country. MadHat Press (2017)
- Victory over the Sun translated by Larissa Shmailo and edited and with an introduction by Eugene Ostashevsky. Červená Barva Press (2014)
- Patient Women (2015)
- In Paran. BlazeVox Books (2009)
- #specialcharacters. Unlikely Books (2014)
- Fib Sequence. Argotist Ebooks (2011)
- A Cure for Suicide. Cervena Barva Press (2006)
- Twenty-first Century Russian Poetry ed. Larissa Shmailo (2013)
- Manifesto of the Humanities Opposition League
