= Igor Terentiev =

Soviet painter and poet

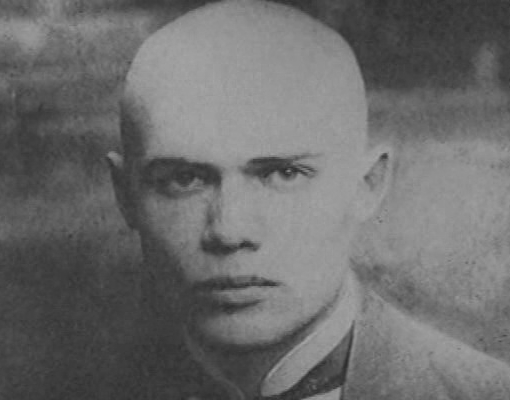
Igor Terentiev

Igor Gerasimovich Terentiev (Russian: Игорь Герасимович Терентьев; 17 January 1892 in Pavlograd – 17 June 1937 in Butyrskaya prison, Moscow) was a poet, artist, stage director, and a representative of the avant-garde tradition. He is known for his Zaum poems, formulated by him during his tiflis period, and his theatrical experiments were an inspiration to the Oberiu collective. Some of his most famous plays include Inspector General, John Reed, and Natalya Tarpova.

== Biography and creative work ==
Terentiev was born in Pavlograd (now Ukraine) into the family of lieutenant Gerasim Lvovich Terentiev and Elizabeth von Derfelden, daughter of a resigned cavalry captain of German descent. He had a brother and two sisters: Vladimir (born 17/29 May 1894), Olga (born 28 April/11 May 1897) and Tatiana (born 18/31 May 1900).

He entered the law department of Kharkov University and in 1912 exchanged into jurisprudential faculty of Moscow University which he graduated in 1914. In 1916 he got married and moved to Tbilisi to live with his wife. In 1918 Terentiev entered the futuristic group "41°" created by Ilya Zdanevich (K. Zdanevich, A. Kruchenykh and others). In 1922 Terentiev unsuccessfully tried to emigrate to reunite with his family. He travelled to Istanbul but at the time when he arrived visas for France, where his family resided, were not available, and he had to return.

In the summer of 1923 Terentiev moved to Petrograd. He worked in the Museum of Art Culture with Kazimir Malevich, Mikhail Matyushin and Pavel Filonov. Early in 1924 he engaged in directorial work at Krasniy Theatre for which he wrote and staged a play called "John Reed" (premiered 24 October 1924). He created experimental Theatre of the House of Press (Russian: Театр Дома Печати) in Shuvalovsky palace on Fontanka quay. Here Terentiev who considered himself Meyerhold's follower staged his own play "Bundle" (Russian: "Узелок"), opera "John Reed" (1926, composed by Vladimir Kashnitsky), Gogol's "The Inspector General", the play "Natalia Tarpova" (based on cognominal novel by S. Semenov).

In 1928 Terentiev was on tour with the Theatre of the House of Press in Moscow's Theatre of Meyerhold. The tour was a success. A. Lunacharsky proposed to move the Theatre to Moscow, but neither placement nor money were provided and the troupe broke up. Terentiev went to Ukraine. In Odessa he staged Afinogenov's "Crank", in Kharkov – "The Inspector General". He worked in Dnepropetrovsk in Gorkiy's Theatre of Russian Drama and developed Ukrainian Youth Theatre.

In 1931 in Dnepropetrovsk Terentiev was arrested. In accordance with 58th enactment(Propaganda inciting rebellion against the regime) he was sentenced to 5 years which he served by labour on Belomorkanal; was released preschedule in 1934. On his arrival in Moscow, Terentiev tried to find work in a theatre but failed. He started shooting the film about the events of the civil war in Kerch called "Rebellion of Stones" (Russian: "Восстание камней") but the project was not finished. Terentiev was called into civilian recruitment on works on Moscow Canal. The construction site was visited by Maxim Gorky, Terentiev's brigade was photographed by A. Rodchenko.

In May 1937 Terentiev was rearrested. He was executed by a firing squad in Butyrskaya prison.
