= Serge Segay =

Russian painter

- Born: Sergej Vsevolodovich Sigov; 19 March 1947; Murmansk, Soviet Union
- Died: 21 September 2014 (aged 67); Kiel, Germany
- Resting place: Leslie, Scotland; 56.202867°N 3.222442°W
- Known for: Painting, drawing, poetry, writing, collage, sound poetry, visual poetry, book art
- Movement: Transfurism, Mail art, abstract art
- Spouse: Ry Nikonova (1942-2014)
- Awards: Andrei Bely Prize

Serge Segay (real name Sergey Vsevolodovich Sigov Russian: Сергей Всеволодович Сигов, 19 March 1947 – 21 September 2014), also known as Sergej Sigej, was a Russian artist, poet, writer as well as specialist in Russian Futurism. Many of his artworks are in private and public collections throughout the world.

He was an important figure in Transfurism movement as an artist, poet, writer, as well as a prominent figure in Mail art history. He was also key member of "Uktuss School" and "Anarfut" art movements.

== Early life ==
Segay was born in Murmansk, Soviet Union on 19 March 1947. His father was a dean of Taganrog university and communist "aparatchik". After school he got a place in Taganrog university, studying Russian literature, with multiple private tutors being paid by his father. Arrangement did not last however, as there was a row between Serge Segay and his father about abstract art, which at that point was deemed as contradicting party guidelines. Row was very bad: Serge Segay run away from home (apparently also in attempt to see exhibition of Marc Chagall's paintings in Vitebsk) and his early paintings were destroyed by his father. As a result, he abandoned his education pursuits. Only much later in life, in 1985, he graduated from Saint Petersburg State Theatre Arts Academy, with diploma in Futurist's drama.

== Marriage ==
He married Ry Nikonova in 1966. Their families were tied by friendship forged during exile years - both Serge Segay's grandmother and Ry Nikonova's grandcousin were exiled together to Kazakhstan by Stalin. Introduced by their parents, they got close via discussing each other's artwork.

== Career ==
=== Anarfuts (Vologda) ===
He was a key figure in movement of Anarcho-futurists in Vologda, Russia, in 1962-1965. At that time he starts writing his first Zaum and abstract verses.

=== Uktuss School (Yekaterinburg) ===
Since 1965, he was a member of "Uktuss School" art movement in Yekaterinburg, Russia. During this time, in 1969, he creates his first "verbal pictures" or "visual poems". In 1970, his first sound poetry. He was an author in samizdat journal "Nomer".

=== Transfurism (Yeysk, Saint-Petersburg) ===
In 1974, he moves to Yeysk with his wife. They start publishing samizdat journal Transponans in 1979, in 5 copies. They entertain numerous guests from both Russian capitals, creating art and poetry in collaboration. Their Yeysk abode becomes the cultural centre for Russian art and literature underground. They also make multiple performances in Saint-Petersburg during these years. Serge Segay becomes close friend of Nikolai Khardzhiev. He also corresponds with Igor Bakhterev.

His paintings during this period feature some obvious symbols: Russian letter 'yat', square heads, centauri and crosses. Early paintings are mostly black and white with occasional colour. Then follows a period of very colourful paintings and painted cloths, influenced by his fascination with Nomadic culture of berbers. At a later stage, he freely mixes both styles with other techniques. Of course, ideas of Transfurism, of mixing visual, verbal and sound, therefore transcending medium ties, are often featured in his body of work during this period and later on.

He also published many articles during this period on Russian Futurism, as well as a book of Vasilisk Gnedov's work.

Since 1991, he participates in another samizdat journal, "Double", which was published by Ry Nikonova in 1991-2001.

=== Mail art ===
Serge Segay joins Mail art movement in 1985. Later on, he organized first international Mail art exhibition in the USSR in 1989, which also happened to be first international art exhibition in Yeysk, Russia. He corresponds with numerous artists around the world, including Robin Crozier, John M. Bennett, Guy Bleus, Shozo Shimamoto and others. He also participates in many Mail art projects.

=== Late period (Kiel) ===
He emigrated to Germany together with his wife in 1998. Initial efforts of integration were thwarted by Ry's diagnosis of cancer, which she subsequently fought for 10 years. Still, Serge Segay continues to participate in Mail art projects, creates visual poetry, sound poetry and paintings. His own cancer was left undiagnosed until it was too late.

=== Death ===
He died on 21 September 2014 in Kiel, Germany .

== References and sources ==
Sources

- Chuck Welch (Ed.), Eternal Network: A Mail Art Anthology Calgary: University of Calgary Press, 1995. ISBN 1-895176-27-1.
- John Held Jr., Mail Art: An Annotated Bibliography, Metuchen 1991
- Jean-Noël Laszlo (editor), Timbres d'Artistes, Musée de la Poste, Paris 1993
- Géza Perneczky, The Magazine Network: The Trends of Alternative Art in the Light of Their Periodicals 1968–1988, Köln 1993
