= The Poem of the End =

The Poem of the End may refer to:

- "The Poem of the End", a poem by Vasilisk Gnedov
- "The Poem of the End", a poem by Marina Tsvetaeva
