= Zangezi =

Poetic work written by Velimir Khlebnikov

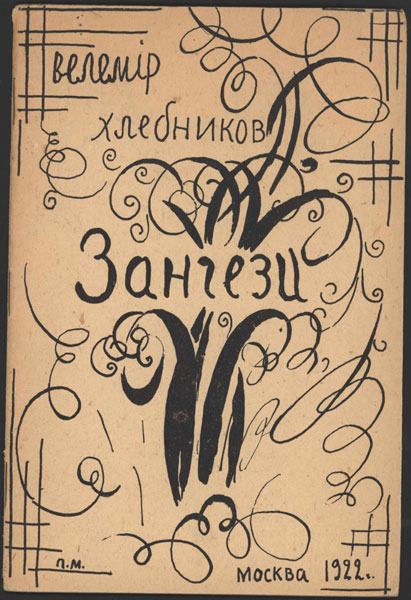
- Cover picture by painter Pyotr Miturich (signed П. М. - Пётр Митурич). The first edition of Zangezi. 1922
- Author: Velimir Khlebnikov
- Cover artist: Pyotr Miturich
- Publication place: Soviet Russia

Zangezi (Russian: Зангези), or Zangezi: A Supersaga in 20 Planes, is a futurist poem-play by Soviet, poet, writer and scholar Velimir Khlebnikov.

== Title and history ==
Zangezi is the name of a prophet in the work, the name being composed from Kalmyk word 'zyange', that in Kalmyk language means "messenger".

The name Zangezi had different variants in Velimir Khlebnikov's draft book (which he was ironically calling in German fashion 'Großbuch'): Zengezi, Mangezi, Changezi, Changili (Зенгези, Мангези, Чангези, Чангили). Some critics said the name Zangezi associated with famous rivers Ganges and Zambezi. Other pointed out that Zangezi is name composed from Kalmyk word 'zyange', that in Kalmyk language means 'the messenger'.

Velimir Khlebnikov wrote to his friend, fellow futurist poet Vasily Kamensky in 1909, that he had wanted to create a work in which 'every chapter must not have a likeness of another' ('...каждая глава не должна походить на другую...'), wanted in the work 'with the generosity of a beggar, throwing all his paints and discoveries on the palette' ('...с щедростью нищего бросить на палитру все свои краски и открытия...').

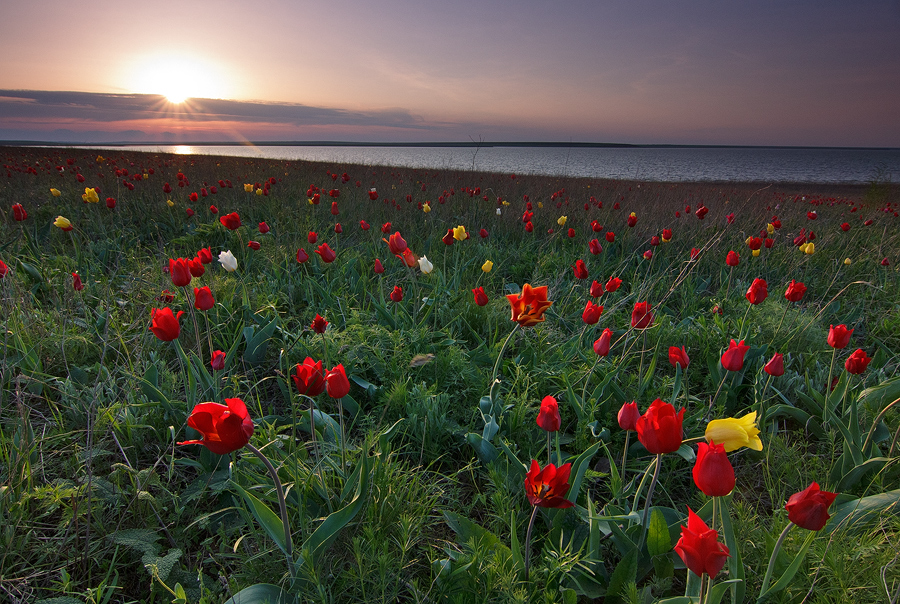
Fields of Kalmykia with tulips in bloom. This is near Velimir Khlebnikov's birthplace in the village Malye Derbety

It is thought that the work was completed in January, 1922, when Velimir Khlebnikov had written in his diaries on January 16, 1922: 'Zangezi gathered-solved'. Literary critics Nikolay Stepanov (Николай Леонидович Степанов) and Yury Tynyanov thought that different parts of Zangezi were written between 1920 and 1922. Pyotr Miturich (Пётр Васильевич Митурич), a painter who helped his friend Velimir Khlebnikov to edit the printed texts when the author was ill and powerless, helped to prepare the work for publication when the author died. He painted the cover of the first publication (see picture above).

The first edition of Zangezi was published in July 1922, but Khlebnikov didn't see the publication because had died a few weeks earlier on June 28, 1922, from what some sources said was malaria. Avant-garde painter Vladimir Tatlin staged the play Zangezi on May 23, 1923 in the Petrograd Museum of Feature Art, in a production where cultural researcher Nikolay Punin and poet Georgy Yakubovsky read lectures before the play began. Tatlin constructed in the play a mechanism for connecting prophet Zangezi with masses, and the stage was decorated with 'star language graphemes'.

Some cultural critics praised the play, while others said (such as Sergey Yutkevich, who would later become a well-known Soviet screenwriter) it was very badly staged.

== Plot ==
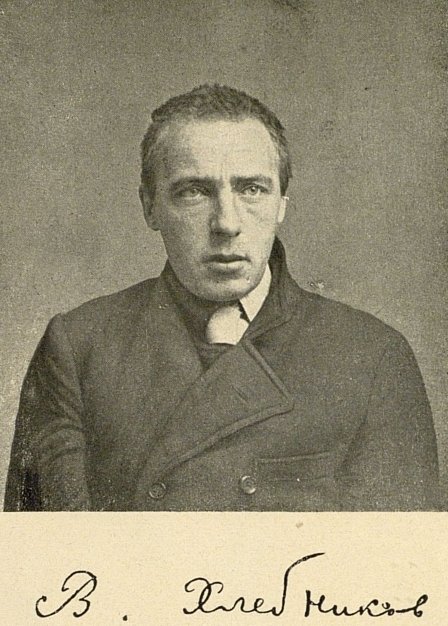
Velimir Khlebnikov in 1916

The prophet Zangezi lives among wildlife, mountains, birds, trees, grasses, gods. Zangezi speaks significant words, but human beings are ignorant to understand him:

Мне, бабочке, залетевшей
В комнату человеческой жизни,
Оставить почерк моей пыли
По суровым окнам, подписью
узника,
На строгих стёклах рока.
Так скучны и серы
Обои из человеческой жизни!
Окон прозрачное „нет“!
Я уж стёр свое синее зарево,
точек узоры,
Мою голубую бурю крыла — первую
свежесть,
Пыльца снята, крылья увяли и
стали прозрачны и жёстки,
Бьюсь я устало в окно человека.
Вечные числа стучатся оттуда
Призывом на родину, число зовут
к числам вернуться.

Translation:

To me, a butterfly, flown
Into the room of human life,
To leave the handwriting of my dust
By the stern windows, with signature
of a prisoner,
On strict glasses of fate.
So boring and grey is
Wallpaper of human life!
Transparent windows say "No"!
I have already erased my blue glow,
dots patterns,
My blue storm of wing and the first
freshness,
Fragile colour removed, wings faded and
become transparent and tough,
I tiredly knock at window of human being.
Eternal numbers knock from there
Calling home, a number is being called
back to numbers.

== Velimir Khlebnikov and Futurism ==
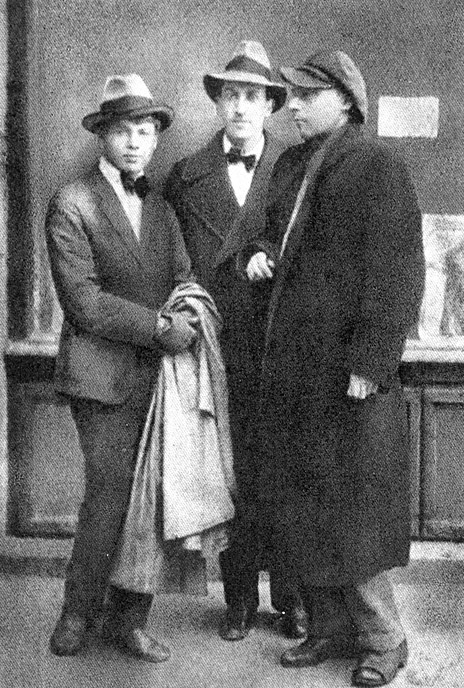
L-R: Sergey Yesenin, Anatoly Marienhof, Velemir Khlebnikov. Kharkiv. 1920

Velimir Khlebnikov invented new words in the play: birds language, words of sky, and 'beyonsense'.

There once was an occasion, when Velimir Khlebnikov said that he didn't belong to Futurism; that is why the literary critic Yury Tynyanov underlined, that he 'not accidentally ... was calling himself the Budetlyanin (a Russian pun, meaning 'a Future Living Being'), not a Futurist, and not accidentally that term was not held' ('...не случайно... называл себя будетлянином (не футуристом), и не случайно не удержалось это слово').

== See also ==
- Roman Jakobson
- Vladimir Mayakovskiy
- Sergei Esenin
- Kazimir Malevich
- Vyacheslav Ivanov
- Imaginism
