= Umka and Bronevik =

Russian band

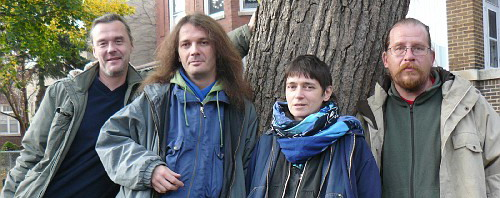
- Umka and Bronevik in Chicago, November 2009.

Background information
- Origin: Moscow, Russia
- Genres: blues rock; Psychedelic rock; bard rock; rock-n-roll; reggae
- Years active: 1995 — 2014, 2015 - present
- Members: Anna Gerasimova, Boris Kanunnikov , Artem Ryabov, Andrey Pankratov
- Past members: Igor Oystach, Denis Dudoladov, Vladimir Kozhekin, Maria Rabinovich, Pavel Freichko, German Olshuk, Pavel Pichugin, Vladimir Gerasimenko, Fedor Mashenedzhinov, Mihail Trofimenko, Boris Makarov and others

Umka and Bronevik (Russian: Умка и Броневик, "Umka and the Armoured Car"), sometimes abbreviated as Umka & Bro, is a Russian band playing in the American and British guitar rock styles of 1960-1970s, ranging from classic rhythm-and-blues to psychedelic.

The present band members are:

- Anna Gerasimova ("Umka"), lead singer, songwriter
- Boris Kanunnikov, lead guitar
- Mikhail Trofimenko, bass guitar
- Boris Markov, drums
- Igor Oistrakh, harp

Umka's songs and the Bronevik music are influenced by Grateful Dead, Iggy Pop, Bob Dylan, Jack Kerouac, as well as Russian Silver Age poets: Daniil Kharms, Osip Mandelshtam, Alexander Vvedensky.

== Discography ==
Note: only the CDs listed on the English official site are listed here.

- 1998 The CD (Russian: Компакт)
- 1998 To Command The Parade (Командовать парадом)
- 1999 Mole's Move (Ход кротом)
- 2000 Dandelion Movie (Кино из одуванчиков)
- 2000 Weltschmerz
- 2001 Stash (Заначка)
- 2002 Handicap's Paradise (Рай для инвалидов)
- 2003 Unplugged
- 2004 Victory Park (Парк Победы)
- 2004 Umka and Bro at AnTrop's (Умка и Броневичок на студии "АнТроп")
- 2005 600
- 2006 No Fear (Ничего страшного)
- 2007 Breaking Isn't Building (Ломать не строить)
- 2009 Closer Sessions (a vinyl LP album recorded in the USA on the Porto Franco Records label)
