= Anna Gerasimova =

Russian singer (born 1961)

Umka
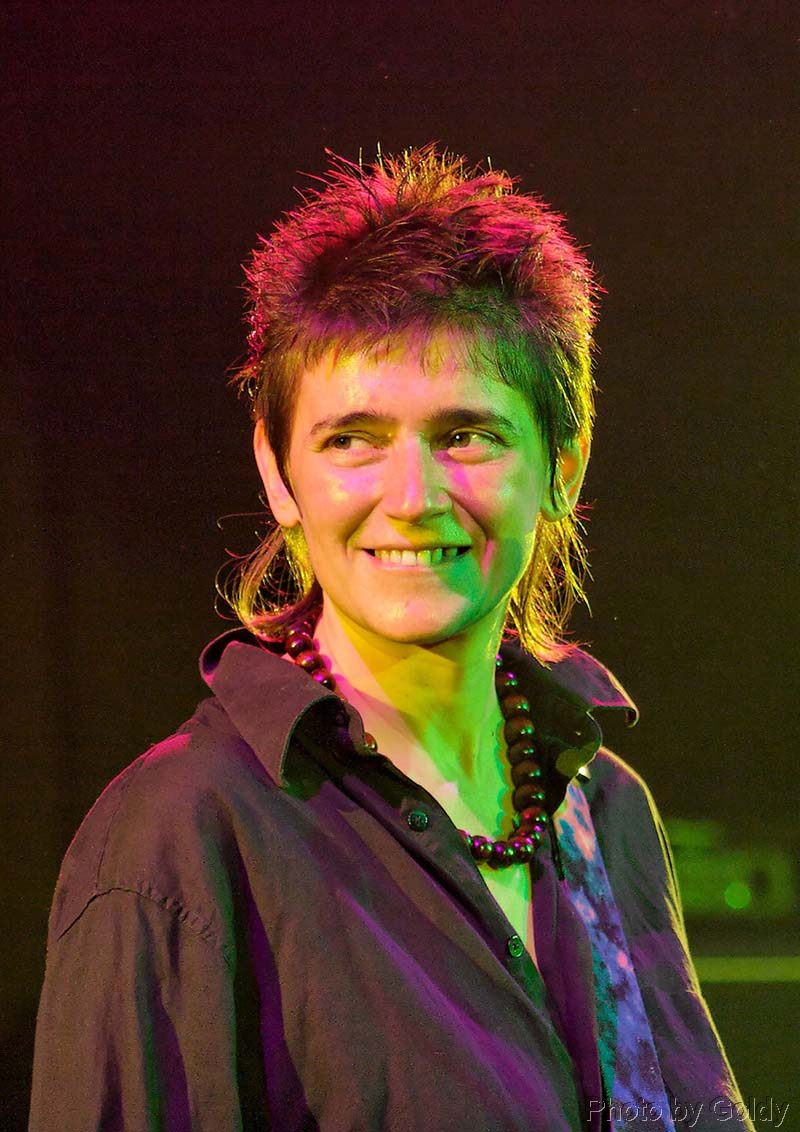
- Umka in B2 club, Moscow, October 2006

Background information
- Born: Anna Georgievna Gerasimova; 19 April 1961 (age 64); Moscow, USSR
- Origin: Moscow, Russia
- Genres: Blues rock, Psychedelic rock, Rock
- Occupations: Singer-songwriter, author, poet, translator
- Instruments: Vocals, guitar, keyboards
- Years active: 1985–1988; 1995–present
- Label: Otdelenie Vykhod
- Website: www.umka.ru

Anna Gerasimova (Russian: А́нна Гео́ргиевна Гера́симова, born 19 April 1961, Moscow), also known by her nickname Umka (Russian: У́мка), is a Russian rock singer-songwriter, the leader of the group Umka and Bronevik. She is also a poet, literary translator, literature researcher, traveler, and a significant person in the Russian hippie movement.

== Songs ==
Songs written and sung by Umka have become well known among the Soviet hippies since 1986. In 1986–87 she recorded five homemade albums with different musicians, and these albums have been widely spread on tapes in the USSR and abroad.

In 1988 she stopped writing songs and switched to philological work and translations; in 1989 she defended her PhD dissertation about OBERIU literary group. In 1995 she returned to active song-writing and performing. She started to perform with occasional musicians in a number of concerts and recorded several homemade albums. Eventually her band has gained the name Bronevichok ("Small Armored Vehicle"; in 2005 the name was changed to Bronevik, "Armored Vehicle").

The first studio album by Umka & Bronevichok was released on tapes in 1997; the first compact disc titled The CD was released in 1998. In these years they have been generally considered as 'underground' musicians, though never willing to remain underground.

Since 1998 about 20 albums were released on CDs. Umka and her band travel extensively; they toured in many cities of the former USSR and many countries abroad (USA, United Kingdom, Israel, Germany, Netherlands). The total number of published songs is above 250; many songs were never released.

== Literary translations ==
Literary and poetic translation was Anna Gerasimova's major field during her studies in the Maxim Gorky Literature Institute. She published translations from German, English, French, but mostly from Lithuanian (Tomas Venclova, Gintaras Patackas, Antanas A. Jonynas, Henrikas Radauskas).

Her most significant published translations include Jack Kerouac's The Dharma Bums (1994) and Big Sur (2002). She has also translated several autobiographic books and interviews of British and American rock musicians: Keith Richards, Iggy Pop, Frank Zappa, Maureen Tucker and others.

== Philology and literary criticism ==
As a professional philologist, Gerasimova published scholarly articles on history of the Russian avant-garde literature, including the legacy of the OBERIU members Alexander Vvedensky, Daniil Kharms and Konstantin Vaginov. She has edited several publications of their previously unpublished works.

== Personal life ==
Gerasimova was married to writer Yegor Radov from 1981 to 1986 with whom she has a son, Alexey Radov.
