= Umka (disambiguation) =

Umka is a suburb of Belgrad, Serbia.

Umka may also refer to:

- Umka, 1969 Soviet animated film.
- Anna Gerasimova or Umka, a Russian poet musician.
