= Alexander Vvedensky (poet) =

Russian poet and dramatist

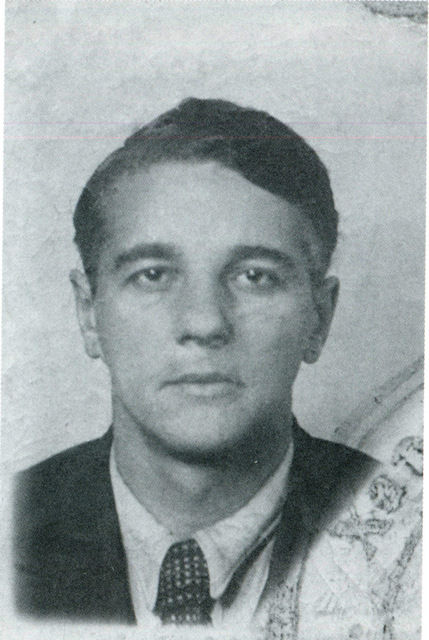
- Born: Alexander Ivanovich Vvedensky; 6 December 1904; Saint Petersburg, Russian Empire
- Died: 19 December 1941 (aged 37)
- Occupations: Poet, dramatist, writer
- Writing career
- Period: Modernism
- Literary movement: OBERIU

Alexander Ivanovich Vvedensky (Russian: Алекса́ндр Ива́нович Введе́нский; 6 December 1904 – 19 December 1941) was a Russian poet and dramatist with formidable influence on "unofficial" and avant-garde art during and after the times of the Soviet Union. Vvedensky is widely considered (among contemporary Russian writers and literary scholars) as one of the most original and important authors to write in Russian in the early Soviet period. Vvedensky considered his own poetry "a critique of reason more powerful than Kant's."

== Biography ==
Vvedensky was born in St. Petersburg, Russia, and took an interest in poetry at an early age. An admirer of Velemir Khlebnikov, Vvedensky sought apprenticeships with writers connected to Russian Futurism. In the early 1920s he studied with well-known avant-garde artists from Futurist circles such as Matiushin and Tufanov and Terentiev, at the newly formed GInHuK state arts school (headed up by Kazimir Malevich).

In Tufanov's sound-poetry circle he met Daniil Kharms, with whom he went on to found the OBERIU group (in 1928). Together Kharms and Vvedensky, along with several other young writers, actors, and artists, staged various readings, plays, and cabaret-style events in Leningrad in the late 1920s. Vvedensky, as written in the OBERIU manifesto, was considered the most radical poet of the group.

Vvedensky, like Kharms, worked in children's publishing to get by, and was also quite accomplished in the field. He wrote vignettes for children's magazines, translated books of children's literature, and wrote several children's books of his own.

He was arrested for a short while in 1931–1932 on charges of belonging to a faction of anti-Soviet children's writers. During interrogations, he was also accused of encoding anti-Soviet messages in "zaum" or sound poetry.

After the arrest and a short exile in Kursk, he returned to Leningrad. In the mid-1930s he moved to Kharkov. There, in 1941, two years after start of World War II, when Nazi Germany invaded USSR from previously occupied Poland, he was unable to board a crowded evacuation train.

He stayed on in Kharkov hoping to catch up later with his family, but was arrested for "counterrevolutionary agitation" in September 1941. With other prisoners evacuated from Kharkov he was shipped to Kazan but died of pleurisy on the way. His place of burial is unknown.

== Work ==
Most of his works (most notably the novel Murderers, you are fools) were for ever lost in the chaos of the war and as the result of the atmosphere of the period: people would destroy any doubtful manuscripts in their possession as incriminating evidence.

The bulk of Vvedensky's extant works survived in the archive of Daniil Kharms. The archive itself was saved by Yakov Druskin, close friend of both poets, who, in the middle of the most deadly winter of Leningrad blockade, came to the abandoned and sealed apartment of arrested Kharms, removed the papers and preserved them.

Most of Vvedensky's poetry was not widely known during his lifetime and not published in Russia until much later. He was known in small circles of writers in Leningrad — Anna Akhmatova praised one of his later poems, "Elegy," very highly.

A two-volume collected works came out first in America, and then in Moscow in 1991. His idiosyncratic, morbidly humorous, and linguistically innovative work has slowly begun to be translated into English and anthologized with other OBERIU writers.
