= Jonathan Marcantoni =

American novelist

Jonathan Marcantoni is an American novelist, screenwriter and editor based out of San Antonio, Texas. He is a co-founder and Managing Editor in Chief of Aignos, an independent, royalty publisher that seeks out experimental and innovative fiction and nonfiction.

Marcantoni has written has published the novels Communion (with Jean Blasiar), and Traveler's Rest. His work is described as a mix of stream of consciousness, existentialism, surrealism, and ellipsism. Marcantoni blends film and theatrical techniques with his narratives, making the environmental and intellectual musings of his characters as essential to the story as the action and dialogue.

== Early life ==
Marcantoni was born on June 6, 1984, in Collegeville, Pennsylvania. He is of Puerto Rican and Corsican descent. He spent much of his childhood in Puerto Rico. He was involved in theatre from an early age and acted in community and semi-professional productions. At age 18, Marcantoni played the character Louis Ironside in a production of Angels in America. He join Behind the Masque, a street performance group, which ended a year later when the founder and Marcantoni's mentor, Jaime Burcham, died in a drowning accident.

At age 21, Marcantoni he decided to dedicate himself to writing and filmmaking and began studies in script writing at the Art Institute of Atlanta. While at the institute, he make several short films with high school friend Todd Carnley. After three months, Marcantoni dropped out to pursue freelance film work in Atlanta.

After failed attempts to publish any of his scripts, Marcantoni decided to return to school at the University of Tampa. While in school, Marcantoni produced the short film Discover Fresh Breath, a parody of breath mint commercials. This film won the TBS Very Funny Award at the Campus Movie Festival in 2007. Marcantoni also wrote the short story The Revolutionary, later to become a chapter in Traveler's Rest. The short story was published in the anthology The Shortcut: 20 Stories to Get You From Here to There in 2006. He also became a contributor and frequent guest on the local news program The Bleepin Truth, and wrote restaurant reviews for The Tampa Bay Sun. In 2009, Marcantoni graduated from the University of Tampa and found work as an editor with Savant Books and Publications, an independent publisher based in Honolulu.

== Savant ==
At Savant, Marcantoni became close to author/playwright Jean Blasiar, working as her editor for the Poor Rich series. Blasiar asked Marcantoni collaborate with her on some television and play projects, leading to the scripts for the shows Mirage and Lily. Mirage would be optioned by Merrill Entertainment in 2012 and Lily would have a staged reading in Los Angeles in 2013.

In October 2010, Blasiar began work on a WWII family drama. Jean asked Marcantoni to collaborate on the book, which centered on a little girl who uses her gift for communicating with animals to find her father, who has gone MIA on the battlefields of France. Marcantoni added a greater magic realist angle to the work, making it less fantastical, and increased the poeticism between the mother and father, making the book more of a love story than it was originally conceived. The result of their collaboration was Communion (2011).

During his time at Savant, Marcantoni also became the editor for Zachary Oliver, whose doctoral thesis on multiple intelligence theory was turned into an education memoir entitled Falling but Fulfilled (2010). In the Spring of 2011, Marcantoni created the manuscript Dancing at the Border of the Abyss, which was later published as Traveler's Rest (2012).

In 2012, Marcantoni and Oliver left Savant and created Aignos Publishing. After negotiations with Savant, Oliver and Marcantoni were allowed to continue the editing and oversee the release of Traveler's Rest, but the book was not a commercial success.

== Aignos Publishing ==
Marcantoni was given permission from Oliver to develop the Aignos Editorial Department along his own lines, and he immediately proceeded to court authors and editors from both North and South America. He pushed for Aignos to be bilingual and focused on Hispanic works. He also sought out authors who were aggressively unconventional, playing with genre and style.

In August 2012, Aignos released Paul Guzzo's book The Dark Side of Sunshine. The book depicted the history of corruption and injustice in Tampa. Guzzo's work attracted attention from the St. Petersburg Times, the Tampa Tribune, and Newsweek's The Daily Beast. The book was moderately successful and set the standard in which Aignos uses a combination of social media and personal appearances to promote its books.

In 2013, Marcantoni hired Rebeca Gomez Galindo to take over the Editorial Department. This gave him time to manage the pre-release and post release marketing of the books and concentrate on his own writing.

== YouNiversity Project ==
In 2014, together with author Chris Campanioni, Marcantoni created the YouNiversity, a digital internship that provides students access to and experience with the publishing industry through media professionals in the United States, Europe, Latin America, and Africa. Unlike the curriculum and objectives of many MFA programs across the United States, the YouNiversity focuses on several different facets of a writer's literary development, including real-time interaction with editors, literary agents, graphic artists, publishers, and other readers and writers. The first two students to complete the program were Yma Johnson and Emma Mayhood, both from Eastern Michigan University.

== Books ==
=== Communion ===
"A mixture of magical realism and war-set family drama revolving around a little girl, Gem, whose ability to communicate with animals assists her in her search to locate her father, who has gone missing in action at the height of World War II. It is at once an intimate portrait of a small Ohio town affected by war and an emotional epic about the enduring love between husband and wife and father and daughter." This WWII drama allowed Marcantoni to indulge in his love for magic realism in telling a story of enduring love and hardship.

=== Traveler's Rest ===
"From the political turmoil of 1920s Puerto Rico, to the aftermath of a devastating hurricane in 2005, Traveler's Rest provides a kaleidoscopic look at a family that has lost its identity and torn itself apart. The ghosts of the past and the horrors of the present follow Tony, a recovering heroin addict, as he seeks to reclaim his family's legacy and set his own path in an increasingly chaotic world." This collection of interconnected short stories was first written in 2006 and blends several literary styles, with Marcantoni experimenting with poetic narratives, stream of consciousness and inner monologues to tell the story of a family who lost their identity after leaving Puerto Rico.

=== The Feast of San Sebastian (El festejo de San Sebastian) ===
This is Marcantoni's first bilingual work. The English version was published by Aignos Publishing in the summer of 2013. The Spanish version was released by Araña Editorial in 2014.

"The Feast of San Sebastian tells the story of two Haitian immigrants who are smuggled into Puerto Rico on yolas, or makeshift rafts, after being promised good jobs and a better life. Instead they are forced into slave labor at a North American factory. When their situation worsens to the point that their lives are at risk, they are given a chance for freedom by a black market middleman. The proposition is that can earn their freedom in exchange for assassinating the corrupt Superintendent of Police."

The work is Marcantoni's most assured, as it uses stream of conscious, multiple perspectives, and separate monologue chapters that allow the five main characters to tell their side of the story. In his own words:

"This book was inspired by the study “Human Trafficking in Puerto Rico: An Invisible Challenge” by César A. Rey Hernández, Ph.D. and Luisa Hernández Angueira, Ph.D. The crimes and criminal syndicates depicted in the book are based on cases described in that study and also in articles published in the newspaper El Nuevo Día and reported by Wapa TV. The raids on slum communities, including La Perla, really did occur between 2009 and 2011, with the raid on La Perla leading to the resignation of then-Superintendent of Police Jose Figueroa Sancha. While these raids were widely believed by residents to be motivated by the desire to force residents to move and replace the slums with hotels, the actual depiction of the raids is fictional.

My intention with this book is to educate, and hopefully, to create action in its readers. The problems facing Puerto Rico can be remedied, but only if we work together as a people to make a better future for our families and our country."

== Influences ==
Marcantoni has been influenced most by Fernando Pessoa, Hubert Selby Jr., Julio Cortazar, and Juan Jose Saer. He often references Selby in his works, particularly in his works possessing a central character with the same name as in other books, although they are different people. Selby used Harry for the central character of his books, while Marcantoni uses the name Antonio (or Tony for short). Marcantoni has said that while the Harry of Selby's work was meant to be an Everyman character, his use of the name Antonio is related to the character he would most want to play as an actor.
