= Victory over the Sun =

1913 Russian Futurist opera

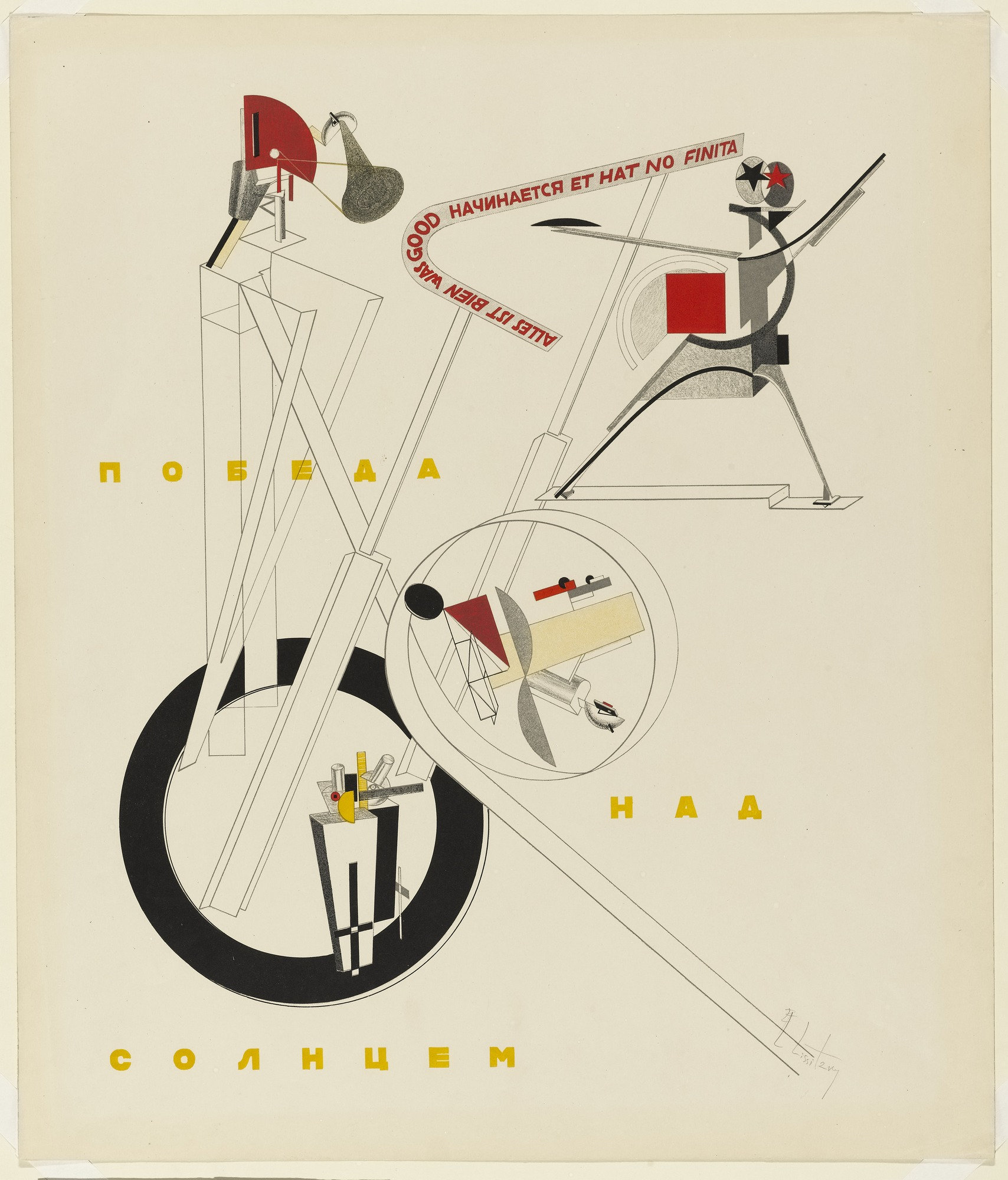
El Lissitzky's poster for a post-revolutionary production of the opera. The macaronic caption reads: All is well that begins well and has not ended.

Victory over the Sun (Russian: Победа над Cолнцем, Pobeda nad Solntsem) is a Russian Futurist opera premiered in 1913 at the Luna Park in Saint Petersburg.

The libretto written in zaum language was contributed by Aleksei Kruchonykh, the music was written by Mikhail Matyushin, the prologue was added by Velimir Khlebnikov, and the stage designer was Kazimir Malevich. The opera has become notable as the event where Malevich made his first Black Square, as part of a design for a curtain. The first performance was organised by the artistic group Soyuz Molodyozhi.

== Plot and reception ==
The plot concerns a group of protagonists who want to destroy reason, by disposing of time and capturing the Sun. The opera was intended to underline parallels between literary text, musical score, and the art of painting, and featured a cast of such extravagant characters as Nero and Caligula in the Same Person, Traveller through All the Ages, Telephone Talker, The New Ones, etc.

The audience reacted negatively and even violently to the performance, as have some subsequent critics and historians.

== Translations ==
The original 1980 English translation of the opera by poet Larissa Shmailo was performed for the celebrated reconstruction of the First Futurist Opera at the Los Angeles County Museum of Art as well as the Brooklyn Academy of Music. It was performed in full staging with digital sets and synthesized music at Boston University 23 April 2015.

== Recent performances ==
In 2015, during the Art Basel fair, the Swiss Beyeler Foundation presented a production of the opera that was shown in the Theater Basel on 17 June 2015. It was a kind of preview to the In Search of 0,10 – The Last Futurist Exhibition of Painting exhibition that ran from 4 October 2015 to 10 January 2016 at the Beyeler Foundation.

A documentary film about the opera was made in 1980.
