= Maloderbetovsky District =

Maloderbetovsky District Малодербетовский район
- District

Other transcription(s)
  - Kalmyk: Баһ Дөрвдә район
- Location of Maloderbetovsky District in the Republic of Kalmykia
- Coordinates: 47°57′N 44°41′E
- Country: Russia
- Federal subject: Republic of Kalmykia
- Established: December 11, 1970
- Administrative center: Malye Derbety

Area
  - Total: 3,665.93 km^{2} (1,415.42 sq mi)

Population (2010 Census)
  - Total: 10,528
  - Density: 2.8718/km^{2} (7.4381/sq mi)
  - Urban: 0%
  - Rural: 100%

Administrative structure
  - Administrative divisions: 6 Rural administrations
  - Inhabited localities: 10 rural localities

Municipal structure
  - Municipally incorporated as: Maloderbetovsky Municipal District
  - Municipal divisions: 0 urban settlements, 6 rural settlements
- Time zone: UTC+3 (MSK)
- OKTMO ID: 85620000
- Website: http://malderadm.ru/

Population of Maloderbetovsky District
- 2010 Census: 10,528
- 2002 Census: 10,404
- 1989 Census: 13,630
- 1979 Census: 12,639

Maloderbetovsky District (Russian: Малодербе́товский райо́н; Kalmyk: Баһ Дөрвдә район, Bağ Dörvdä rayon) is an administrative and municipal district (raion), one of the thirteen in the Republic of Kalmykia, Russia. It is located in the north of the republic. The area of the district is 3,665.93 square kilometers (1,415.42 sq mi). Its administrative center is the rural locality (a selo) of Malye Derbety. As of the 2010 Census, the total population of the district was 10,528, with the population of Malye Derbety accounting for 61.1% of that number.

== History ==
The district was established on December 11,1970.

== Administrative and municipal status ==
Within the framework of administrative divisions, Maloderbetovsky District is one of the thirteen in the Republic of Kalmykia. The district is divided into six rural administrations which comprise ten rural localities. As a municipal division, the district is incorporated as Maloderbetovsky Municipal District. Its six rural administrations are incorporated as six rural settlements within the municipal district. The selo of Malye Derbety serves as the administrative center of both the administrative and municipal district.

== Natural resources ==
The area has substantial bischofite deposits.

== Rabid wolves ==
In 2003, rabid wolves were reported in the district.
