= Dyr bul shchyl =

1912 Russian Futurist poetry book written in zaum

- by Aleksei Kruchenykh
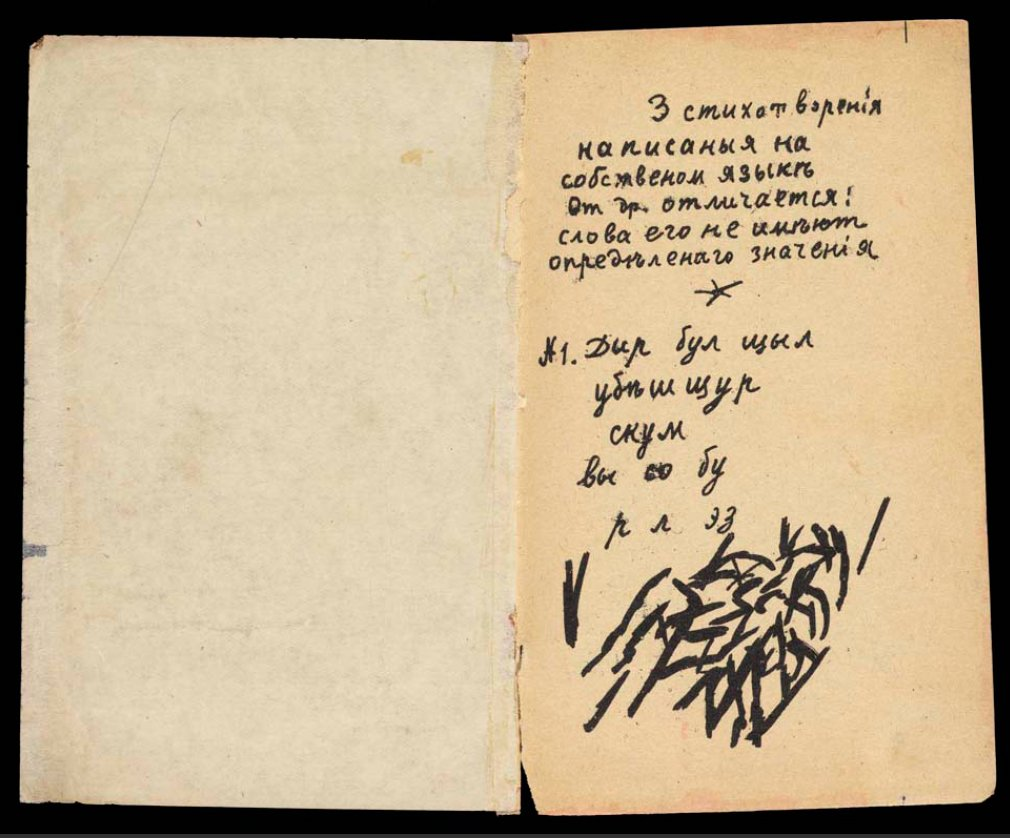
- Original title: Дыр бул щыл
- Written: 1912
- First published in: 1913
- Illustrator: Mikhail Larionov
- Country: Russia
- Language: Zaum
- Series: Three poems
- Publication date: January 1913

Dyr bul shchyl

Dyr bul shchyl (Zaum: Дыр бул щыл, [dɨr bul ɕːɨl]) is the earliest and most famous zaum/transrational poem by Aleksei Kruchenykh, written using the Zaum language, which, according to the author, is "more Russian national, than in all of Pushkin's poetry".

The poem was written in December 1912. This date the author then called "the time of occurrence of the phenomenon of Zaum language (i.e. the language that has no utility value), in which are written the whole independent works, and not just parts thereof (as the chorus, sound decoration, etc.)". Initiator of the creation of the work of the "unknown words" was David Burliuk. "Dyr bul shchyl" was published in January 1913 in a series of "three poems" in Kruchenykh's book Pomada (English: Pomade). According to Kruchenykh, this poem was to become much more known than him. Prefacing the poems, he also stated that "its words do not have/a definite meaning".

The poem, in Majorie Perloff's English transliteration, runs:

Dyr bul shchyl
ubesh shchur
skum
vy so bu
r l èz

—
