= Ilia Zdanevich =

Polish-Georgian (later French) writer and artist

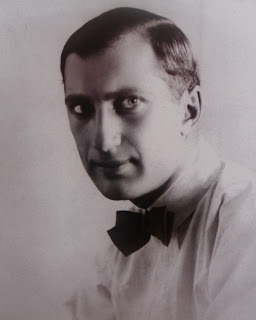
Ilia Zdanevich

Ilia Mikhailovich Zdanevich (Georgian: ილია ზდანევიჩი, (April 21, 1894 – December 25, 1975), known as Iliazd (Georgian: ილიაზდ), was a Georgian and French poet, writer, artist and publisher of Georgian-Polish descent, and an active participant in such avant-garde movements as Futurism and Dada.

== Early life ==
He was born in Tbilisi to a Polish father, Michał Zdaniewicz, who taught French in a gymnasium and a Georgian mother, Valentina Gamkrelidze, who was a pianist and student of Tchaikovsky. (His older brother Kiril Zdanevich also became an artist.) He studied in the Faculty of Law of Saint Petersburg State University.

In 1912 he and his brother, along with their friend Mikhail Le-Dantyu, became enthusiastic about the Tbilisi painter Niko Pirosmanashvili; Ilya's article about him, "Khudozhnik-samorodok" ("A natural-born artist"), his first publication, appeared in the February 13, 1913, issue of Zakavkazskaia Rech'. Later in 1913 he published a monograph Natalia Goncharova, Mikhail Larionov under the pseudonym Eli Eganbyuri (Russian: Эли Эганбюри). In June 1914 the journal Vostok published his article "Niko Pirosmanashvili," in which he mythologized the biography of the older artist, linking him with the Silver Age and the Russian avant-garde. He became involved with the new Futurist movement, participating in their discussions and writing about them and Marinetti in the Russian press, and was drawn to other avant-garde movements as well, such as Zaum and dadaism.

During World War I Zdanevich returned to the Caucasus as a newspaper correspondent, and from 1917 to 1919 he lived in Tbilisi, where he published several collections of poetry in the zaum style (Yanko Krul Albansky, Ostraf Paskhi, and Zga Yakaby). In 1918, he joined Aleksei Kruchenykh and others in the Futurist group "41°." Zdanevich in 1919 adopted the pseudonym Iliazd. He left Tiflis for Batumi.

== Paris ==
In October 1920 left the country to investigate the new artistic currents of France. After a year spent in Constantinople acquiring a French visa, he arrived in Paris in October 1921, where together with other artists he organized the group Cherez ("Across"), whose aim was to bring Russian émigrés together with representatives of French culture.

In 1923 he began his novel Parizhachi, about four couples who agree to dine together in the Bois de Boulogne; in the course of two and a half hours (each chapter has an exact time for a title, from 11.51 to 14.09) they all manage to betray each other, and the novel itself breaks all manner of orthographic, punctuational, and compositional rules. Zdanevich continued working on this "hyperformalist" novel (which he described as an opis', or "inventory") until 1926, but it was not published until 1994.

His second novel, Voskhishchenie ("Rapture"), was published in a small edition in 1930 and was ignored at the time. Set in mythical Georgia among mountaineers, on the surface a crime novel, it is actually a fictionalized history of the Russian avant-garde, full of allusions to world literature; it could be said to anticipate magic realism. The language of the novel is innovative and poetic, and the Slavist Milivoje Jovanović called it "undoubtedly the summit toward which the Russian avant-garde was striving."

Zdanevich's 1923 poster for his and Tristan Tzara's Soirée du coeur à barbe [Evening of the bearded heart] is a widely known example of avant-garde typography and graphic design. During the last forty years of his life in Paris, Zdanevich was active in a variety of areas. He did analyses of church elevations, created fabrics for Chanel, and above all dedicated himself to the creation of artist's books with the collaboration of Picasso, Max Ernst, Miro, and others, and which he published under the imprint "Le Degré 41", or "Le Degré Quarante et Un" (English, "The 41st Degree"). His innovative typographic and design work has been exhibited at the New York Public Library, MOMA, in Montreal, in Tbilisi in 1989 in a joint exhibition with his brother Kiril, and in many other venues. Catalogs for many of these exhibitions exist and contain considerably more detailed information about his life and works.

In 1972, Iliazd published Pirosmanashvili – 1914, which included a translation of an article he published on Niko Pirosmani in 1914 in Tbilisi, and his new article 60 Years Later, for which Picasso painted a portrait of Pirosmanashvili in etching technique.

Ilia Zdanevich died on Christmas Day 1975 in Paris. He was buried at the Georgian émigré cemetery at Leuville-sur-Orge.
