= Malye Derbety =

Malye Derbety Малые Дербеты
- Selo

Other transcription(s)
  - Kalmyk: Баһ Дөрвд
- Interactive map of Malye Derbety
- Location within European Russia Location within Kalmykia Location within Russia
- Coordinates: 47°57′17″N 44°40′51″E
- Country: Russia
- Federal subject: Kalmykia
- Founded: 1803

Population (2010 Census)
  - Total: 6,434
  - Estimate (2021): 6,286 (−2.3%)
- Time zone: UTC+3 (MSK)
- Postal code: 359420
- OKTMO ID: 85620455101

Malye Derbety (Russian: Ма́лые Дербе́ты; Kalmyk: Баһ Дөрвд, Bağ Dörvd) is a rural locality (a selo) and the administrative center of Maloderbetovsky District in the Republic of Kalmykia, Russia. Population: 6,434 (2010 census); 5,980 (2002 census); 6,637 (1989 Soviet census).

Malye Derbety was the birthplace of Velimir Khlebnikov.
