= Chris Campanioni =

American poet

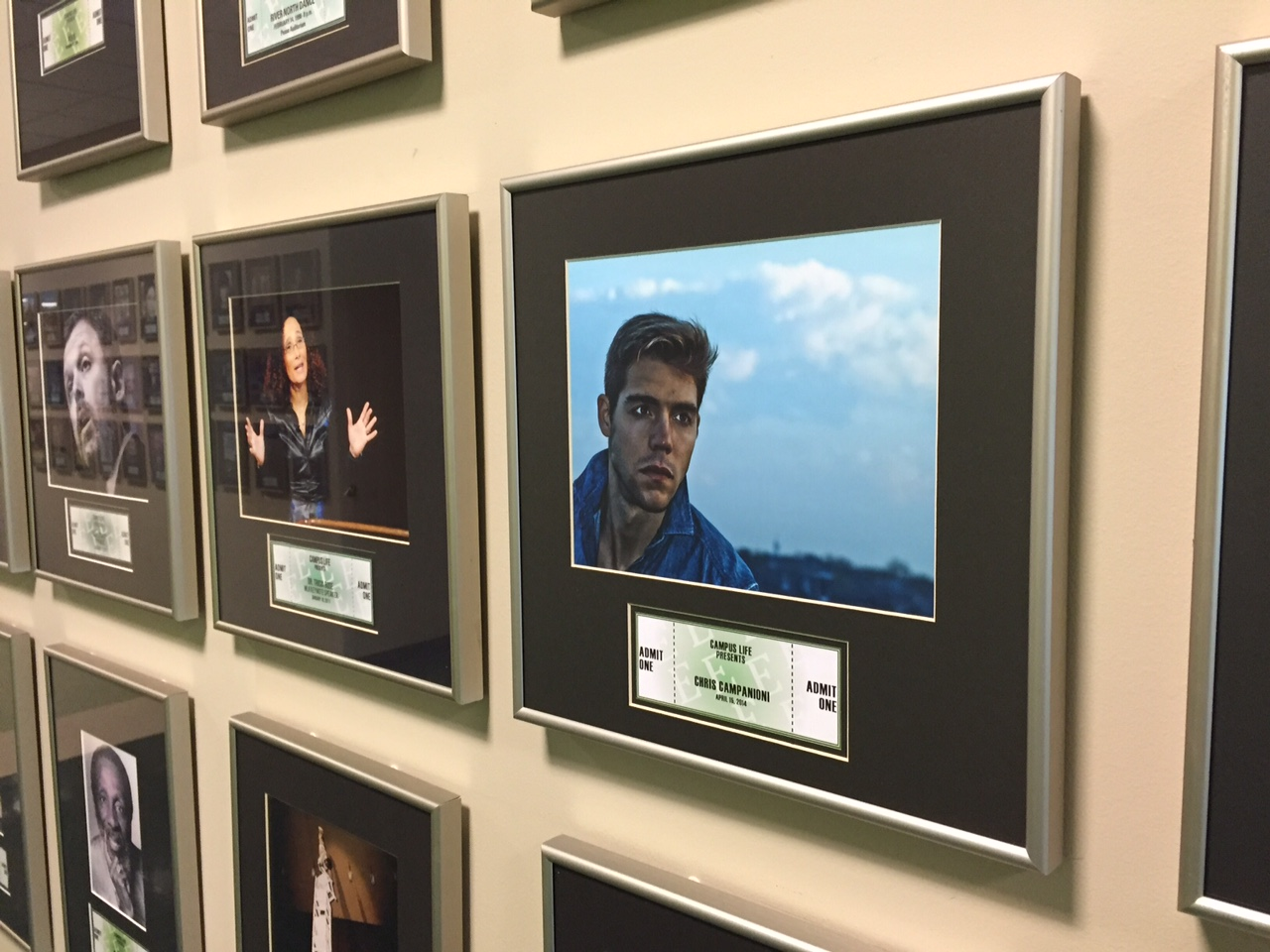
- Campanioni pictured in Eastern Michigan University's hall of distinguished speakers.
- Born: Chris Campanioni
- Education: Lehigh University, Fordham University, CUNY Graduate Center
- Occupations: Author; teacher; model
- Website: chriscampanioni.com

Chris Campanioni is a first-generation American writer and the son of exiles from Cuba and Poland, born April 17, 1985. He was born in Manhattan and raised in New Jersey, studied literature and critical theory at Lehigh University, Fordham University, and the CUNY Graduate Center, where he received his PhD. He has taught Latina/o literature, journalism, media studies, and creative writing at Baruch College, John Jay College of Criminal Justice, and Pace University, while serving on faculty at Yale University's Yale Writers' Workshop and the Hudson Valley Writers' Center. He is the recipient of the Academy of American Poets College Prize (2013), the International Latino Book Award (2014), the Pushcart Prize (2016), and the Mary Shelley Award for Outstanding Fictional Work (2026). From 2014–2016, along with Puerto Rican novelist Jonathan Marcantoni, he ran the YouNiversity, a non-profit digital workshop that provided students access to and experience with the publishing industry through media professionals in the United States, Europe, Latin America, and Africa.

== Style and influence ==
Campanioni's fiction is affiliated with Latin American Surrealism along with Brion Gysin and his cut-up technique. While also influenced by the historic avant-garde (Dada, et al.), the coterie that haunts his early novels is the Situationist International. Readers frequently link Campanioni's poetics to cinema, particularly documentary, describing his process-oriented poems as a filmic medium, distinct from a visual medium, that foregrounds the how and where of writing.

== Reactions ==
Campanioni won the 2026 Mary Shelley Award for Outstanding Fictional Work for his novel VHS (CLASH Books, 2025). His creative nonfiction, north by north/west (West Virginia University Press), published during the same year, was a finalist for the 2025 Foreword INDIES Book of the Year Award in Multicultural Nonfiction. Research that later became his scholarly monograph, Drift Net (Lever Press, 2025), about works of art born in translation and migrant subjectivity, was awarded the Calder Prize for interdisciplinary research by the City University of New York's Graduate Center. Campanioni has described the relationship between his creative and scholarly books as an attempt to find a mode to accommodate different opportunities for discovery. His two poetry collections, Windows 85 (2024) and Rolling Windows (2026), both published by Roof Books, entangle interactions at refugees shelters and community centers with broader theorizations of the unstable relationship between originals and copies, the interactions and discrepancies that occur when a text migrates across sign systems.

His book-length notebook A and B and Also Nothing (Otis Books | Seismicity Editions, 2020) was celebrated by BOMB as "a brilliant manifesto-aria on what it means to attend, to concentrate, to listen, to resist, and to reckon."

Technoculture praised the Internet is for real (C&R Press, 2019) as "an autobiography in and of assemblage," Harvard Review called it "a threshold book," and Hobart described it as "a much-needed treatise on 'post-Internet' culture."

Death of Art (C&R Press, 2016) was celebrated as "bringing surprise and joy back to Conceptual writing" and "a striking amalgamation of memoir and social critique, poetry and cultural theory."

Minor Literature[s] 2015 review of Campanioni's work across media focused on his parents' exile past and his dislocated present, asserting that Campanioni's poetry had found ways to re-evaluate technology as a conduit for connection and learning, especially linguistically.

Going Down was initially lauded by various media, including the Manhattan Times, for its realistic portrayal of the newsroom and the fashion industry from the Latino perspective. The novel has also garnered criticism for its dark tone and confusing meta-fiction writing style.

In the spring of 2013, Campanioni was awarded the Academy of American Poets College Prize. From Susan L. Miller and the Academy of American Poets committee:

"Campanioni immediately draws the reader in with a sharp sensibility for the music of language. 'Forty faces, one line' demonstrates an aptitude for poetic structure as well as a contemporary sense of rhyme, and 'Billboards' focuses first in a prose-poem, then in quatrains, on the contrast between the self commodified and the loneliness of the soul inside of the commodified body. By focusing outside and inside the self in refreshing ways, Campanioni offers us meditations on 'body and soul' that include the elegant woman who’s dropped her dentures as well as the child yearning to eat cake. The poem 'Endnotes for Life' takes familiar territory (the story of Lot’s wife, the story of Orpheus and Eurydice, and the personal narrative) and makes a structure for it that calls into question the primacy of narrative in much American poetry. These sharp views of the human theater force us to examine our place in it, and to question what more exists in our own internal worlds."

== Multimedia Work ==
In collaboration with designer Ab[Screenwear] and director Nadia Bedzhanova, the adaptation of Campanioni's poem "This body's long (& I'm still loading)" was in the official selection of the Canadian International Film Festival in 2017.

In the month leading to Going Down's 2013 release, Campanioni created an interactive video calendar featuring film adaptations from various scenes in the novel. The interactive calendar reevaluates the notion of "real time" and also broadens the ways in which readers can respond to and read a text. RealClear's December 2013 feature ("The Model Writer") compared Campanioni's work to Andy Warhol's faux documentarian style and French New Wave cinema.
