= Velimir Khlebnikov =

Russian playwright, poet and futurist (1885-1922)

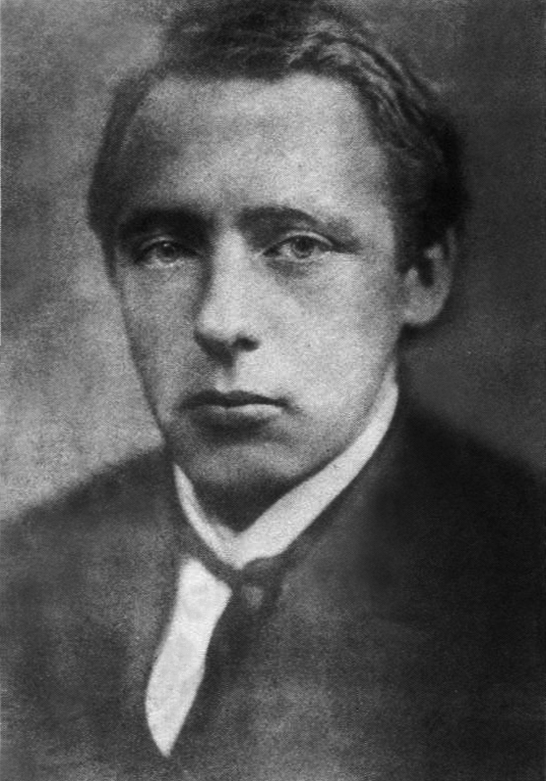
- Born: Viktor Vladimirovich Khlebnikov; 9 November [O.S. 28 October] 1885; Malye Derbety, Astrakhan Governorate, Russian Empire
- Died: 28 June 1922 (aged 36); Kresttsy, Novgorod Oblast, Russian SFSR, Soviet Union
- Writing career
- Pen name: Velimir Khlebnikov
- Language: Russian, Zaum
- Movement: Russian Futurism

Viktor Vladimirovich Khlebnikov, better known by the pen name Velimir Khlebnikov (Note: Also romanized Velemir and Chlebnikov, Hlebnikov, or Xlebnikov.) (Russian: Велими́р Хле́бников, IPA: [vʲɪlʲɪˈmʲir ˈxlʲɛbnʲɪkəf]; (Note: In old orthography, Велем́ір Хле́бников) 9 November [O.S. 28 October] 1885 – 28 June 1922), was a Russian poet and playwright, a central part of the Russian Futurist movement, but his work and influence stretch far beyond it. Influential linguist Roman Jakobson hailed Khlebnikov as "the greatest world poet of our century".

== Biography ==
Viktor Vladimirovich Khlebnikov was born in 1885 in Malye Derbety, Astrakhan Governorate, Russian Empire (in present-day Kalmykia). He was of Russian and Zaporozhian Cossack descent. His younger sister, Vera Khlebnikova, was an artist. He moved to Kazan, where he attended school. He then attended school in Saint Petersburg. He eventually quit school to become a full-time writer. His earliest works are from 1908.

Wingletting with the goldenscrawl
Of its finest sinews,
The grasshopper loaded its trailer-belly
With many coastal herbs and faiths.
"Ping, ping, ping!" tra-lah-ed the zingzinger.
O, swanderful!
O, illuminate!

— Кузнечик/Grasshopper (1908-1909)

In 1909-10, he met the to-be Russian Futurists Vasily Kamensky, David Burliuk, and Vladimir Mayakovsky. Soon Khlebnikov would belong to Hylaea, the most significant Russian Futurist group (along with Mayakovsky, Aleksei Kruchenykh, David Burliuk and Benedikt Livshits). However, he had already written many significant poems before the Futurist movement in Russia had taken shape. Among his contemporaries, he was regarded as "a poet's poet" (Mayakovsky referred to him as a "poet for producers") and a maverick genius. Khlebnikov was involved in the publication of A Slap in the Face of Public Taste in 1912, which was a critical component of the Russian futurist poetry.

Khlebnikov is known for poems such as "Incantation by Laughter", "Bobeobi Sang The Lips", "The Grasshopper" (all 1908-1909), "Snake Train" (1910), the prologue to the Futurist opera Victory over the Sun (1913), dramatic works such as "Death's Mistake" (1915), prose works such as "Ka" (1915), and the so-called 'super-tale' (сверхповесть) "Zangezi", a drama written partly in zaum. He published Selected Poems with Postscript, 1907–1914 circa 1914. Kazimir Malevich and Pavel Filonov co-illustrated it.

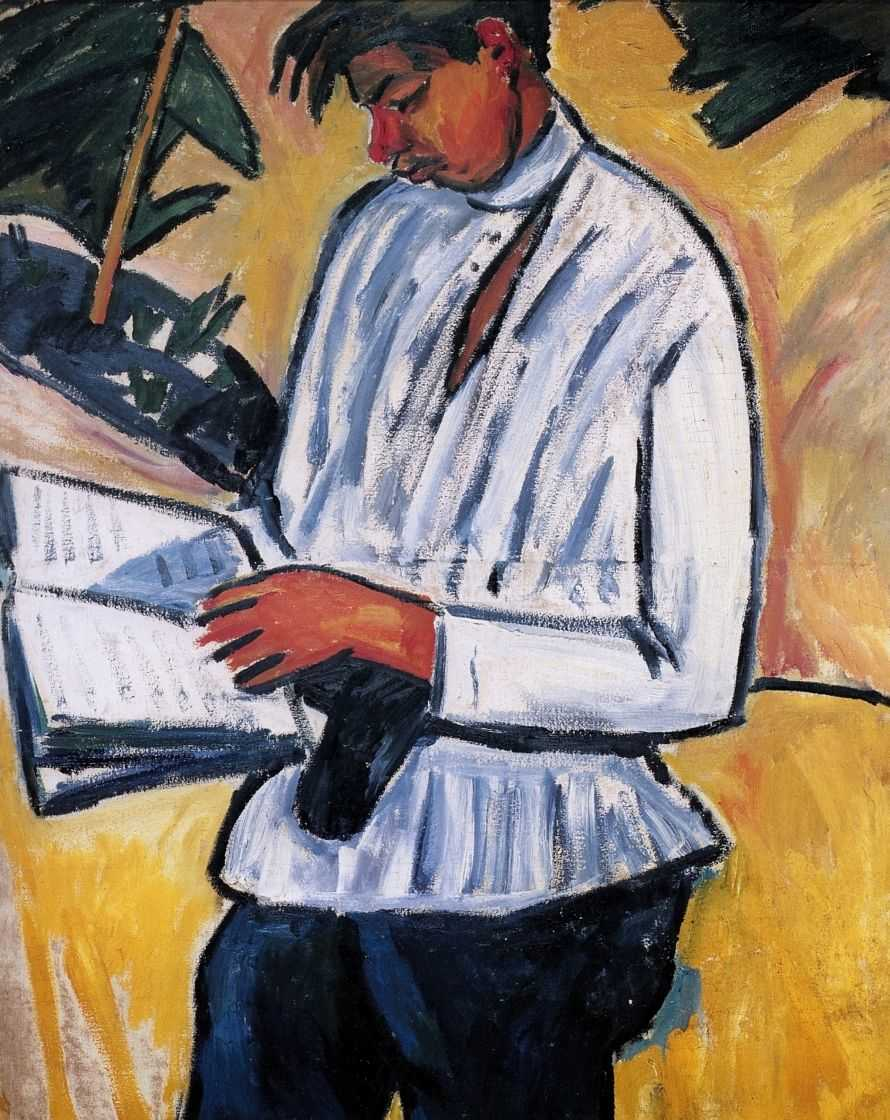
Velimir Khlebnikov, painted in 1910 by Mikhail Larionov

In his work, Khlebnikov experimented with the Russian language, drawing upon its roots to invent huge numbers of neologisms, and finding significance in the shapes and sounds of individual letters of Cyrillic. Along with Kruchenykh, he originated zaum, a language defying translation. He wrote futurological essays about such things as the possible evolution of mass communication ("The Radio of the Future") and transportation and housing ("Ourselves and Our Buildings"). He described a world in which people live and travel about in mobile glass cubicles that can attach themselves to skyscraper-like frameworks, and in which all human knowledge can be disseminated to the world by radio and displayed automatically on giant book-like displays at streetcorners. In 1912, he also published a method to predict historical events; one of the examples given was a "collapse of an empire in 1917".

Although Khlebnikov had supported the 1917 Russian Revolution and shared many of its utopian visions, his works were criticized by the Soviets for not conforming to the structures of socialist realism.

In 1921, he was able to travel to Persia; excited at his arrival, he wrote poems chronicling exciting events and the sights around him. He also made friends with several dervishes. He was forced to go back to Russia in August of that year.

In his final years, Khlebnikov became fascinated with Slavic mythology and Pythagorean numerology, drawing up long "Tables of Destiny" decomposing historical intervals and dates into functions of the numbers 2 and 3.

Khlebnikov died while a guest in the house of his friend Pyotr Miturich near Kresttsy, in June 1922. There has been no medical diagnosis of his last illness; he suffered from gangrene and paralysis (he seems not to have recovered the use of his legs after his 1920 hospitalization in Kharkov), and it has been suggested that he died of blood poisoning or toxemia.

A minor planet 3112 Velimir discovered by Soviet astronomer Nikolai Stepanovich Chernykh in 1977 is named after him.

== Publishing history ==
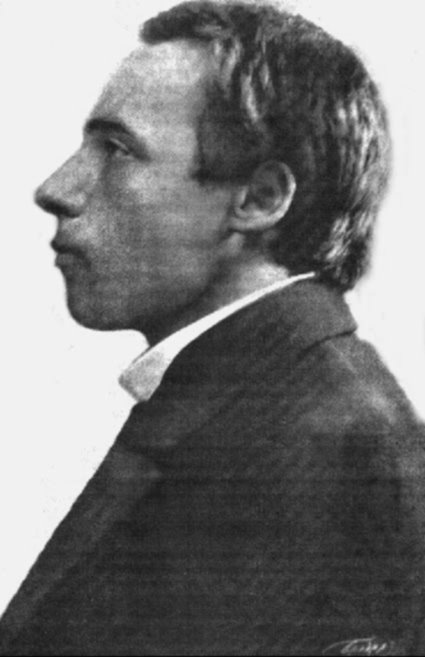
Khlebnikov in 1913

Long poems

- 1910: “Snake Train”
- 1913: Prologue to the Futurist opera Victory over the Sun

Plays

- 1912: The Little Devil

Books

- 1912: Teacher and Student. Conversation
- 1914: Roar! Gauntlets, 1908–1914
- 1915: Death’s Mistake
- 1921: "Washerwoman & other poems
- 1922: Zangezi (сверхповесть)

Radio project

- 1921: The Radio of the Future

Short stories

- 1913: “Nikolai”
