= Zaum =

Linguistic experiments in sound symbolism and language creation

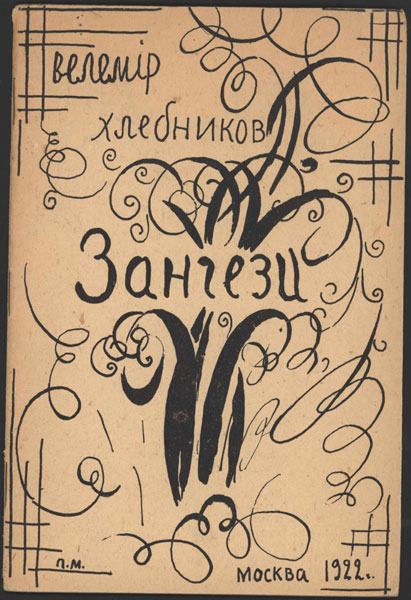
- Khlebnikov's book Zangezi (1922)
- Created by: Aleksei Kruchenykh
- Date: 1910s
- Setting and usage: Poetic experimentation
- Purpose: constructed languages: artistic languages; Zaum
- Writing system: Cyrillic script

Language codes
- ISO 639-3: qmz (private use)
- IETF: art-x-zaum (private use)

Zaum (Russian: за́умь, lit. 'transrational') are the linguistic experiments in sound symbolism and language creation of Russian Cubo-Futurist poets such as Velimir Khlebnikov and Aleksei Kruchenykh. Zaum is a non-referential phonetic entity with its own ontology. The language consists of neologisms that mean nothing. Zaum is a language organized through phonetic analogy and rhythm. Zaum literature cannot contain any onomatopoeia or psychopathological states.

== Usage ==
Aleksei Kruchenykh created Zaum in order to show that language was indefinite and indeterminate.

Kruchenykh stated that when creating Zaum, he decided to forgo grammar and syntax rules. He wanted to convey the disorder of life by introducing disorder into the language. Kruchenykh considered Zaum to be the manifestation of a spontaneous non-codified language.

Khlebnikov believed that the purpose of Zaum was to find the essential meaning of word roots in consonantal sounds. He believed such knowledge could help create a new universal language based on reason.

Examples of Zaum include Kruchenykh's poem Dyr bul shchyl, Kruchenykh's libretto for the Futurist opera Victory over the Sun with music by Mikhail Matyushin and stage design by Kazimir Malevich, and Khlebnikov's so-called "language of the birds", "language of the gods" and "language of the stars". The poetic output is perhaps comparable to that of the contemporary Dadaism, but the linguistic theory or metaphysics behind Zaum was entirely devoid of the gentle reflexive irony of that movement, and in all seriousness intended to recover the sound symbolism of a lost aboriginal tongue. Exhibiting traits of a Slavic national mysticism, Kruchenykh aimed at recovering the primeval Slavic mother-tongue in particular.

Kruchenykh would author many poems and mimeographed pamphlets written in Zaum. These pamphlets combine poetry, illustrations, and theory.

The use of Zaum peaked from 1916 to 1920 during World War I. At this time, Zaumism took root as a movement primarily involved in visual arts, literature, poetry, art manifestoes, art theory, theatre, and graphic design, and concentrated its anti-war politic through a rejection of the prevailing standards in art through anti-art cultural works. Zaum activities included public gatherings, demonstrations, and publications. The movement influenced later styles, Avant-garde and downtown music movements, and groups including surrealism, nouveau réalisme, Pop Art and Fluxus.

Even after its peak, Zaum poetry has continued to be written. Serge Segay created Zaum poetry beginning around 1962. Rea Nikonova started creating Zaum verses probably a bit later, around 1964. Their Zaum poetry can be seen in issues of the famous "Transponans" samizdat magazine. In 1990, contemporary avant-garde poet Sergei Biriukov founded an association of poets called the "Academy of Zaum" in Tambov.

== Etymology and meaning ==
Coined by Kruchenykh in 1913, the word zaum or zaum' is made up of the Russian prefix за "beyond, behind" and noun умъ "the mind, nous" and has been translated as "transreason", "transration" or "beyonsense." According to scholar Gerald Janecek, zaum can be defined as experimental poetic language characterized by indeterminacy in meaning.

Kruchenykh, in "Declaration of the Word as Such (1913)", declares zaum "a language which does not have any definite meaning, a transrational language" that "allows for fuller expression" whereas, he maintains, the common language of everyday speech "binds". He further maintained, in "Declaration of Transrational Language (1921)", that zaum "can provide a universal poetic language, born organically, and not artificially, like Esperanto."

== Major zaumniks ==
- Linguist and anthropologist Roman Jakobson
- Velimir Khlebnikov
- Aleksei Kruchenykh
- Ilia Zdanevich
- Igor Terentev
- Aleksandr Tufanov
- Alexander Vvedensky
- Kazimir Malevich
- Olga Rozanova
- Varvara Stepanova
