= Ry Nikonova =

Russian painter

- Born: Anna Aleksandrovna Tarshis; 25 June 1942; Yeysk, Russia
- Died: 10 March 2014 (aged 71); Kiel, Germany
- Resting place: Leslie, Scotland
- Known for: Painting, drawing, poetry, writing, sound poetry, visual poetry, book art
- Movement: Transfurism, mail art, abstract art
- Spouse: Serge Segay (m. 1947)

Anna Aleksandrovna Tarshis (Russian: Анна Александровна Таршис; 25 June 1942 – 10 March 2014), better known as Ry Nikonova (Russian: Ры Никонова) or Rea Nikonova, was a Russian artist, poet, and writer. Many of her artworks are held in private and public collections throughout the world.

Nikonova was a main theoretical thinker behind Transfurism movement as well as a prominent figure in mail art history. Her literary and visual works were published in Russia, Spain, US, and other countries. She was an editor of samizdat magazines Transponans and Double. She founded "Uktuss School" art movement in Yekaterinburg, Russia.

== Biography ==
=== Early life ===
Ry Nikonova was born Anna Aleksandrovna Tarshis on 25 June 1942 in Yeysk, which was occupied by Nazi Germany at the time. She was born into a very artistic family who saw playing piano, singing, and composing music as normal after-work entertainment. She graduated from the Sverdlovsk Music College in 1961, then entered the Leningrad State Institute of Theatre, Music, and Cinema in 1965. She was expelled in 1967, because her paintings were non-conformant to the communist standards of that day.

She married Serge Segay in 1966. Their families were tied together by friendship forged during exile; his grandmother and her grandcousin were exiled together to Kazakhstan by Stalin. Introduced by their parents, they became close by discussing each other's artwork and remained married until her death in 2014.

=== Uktuss School (Sverdlovsk) ===
She founded the "Uktuss School" art movement in Sverdlovsk (today Yekaterinburg). They were creating abstract art and experimented with avant-garde poetry and writing. She also founded the samizdat journal "Nomer". Many artworks from that era now are in possession of Russian collector Vadim Yegorov. In 1971 she creates first visual poems. Then she creates first vacuum poems, and first poems in form of tables.

=== Transfurism (Yeysk, Leningrad) ===
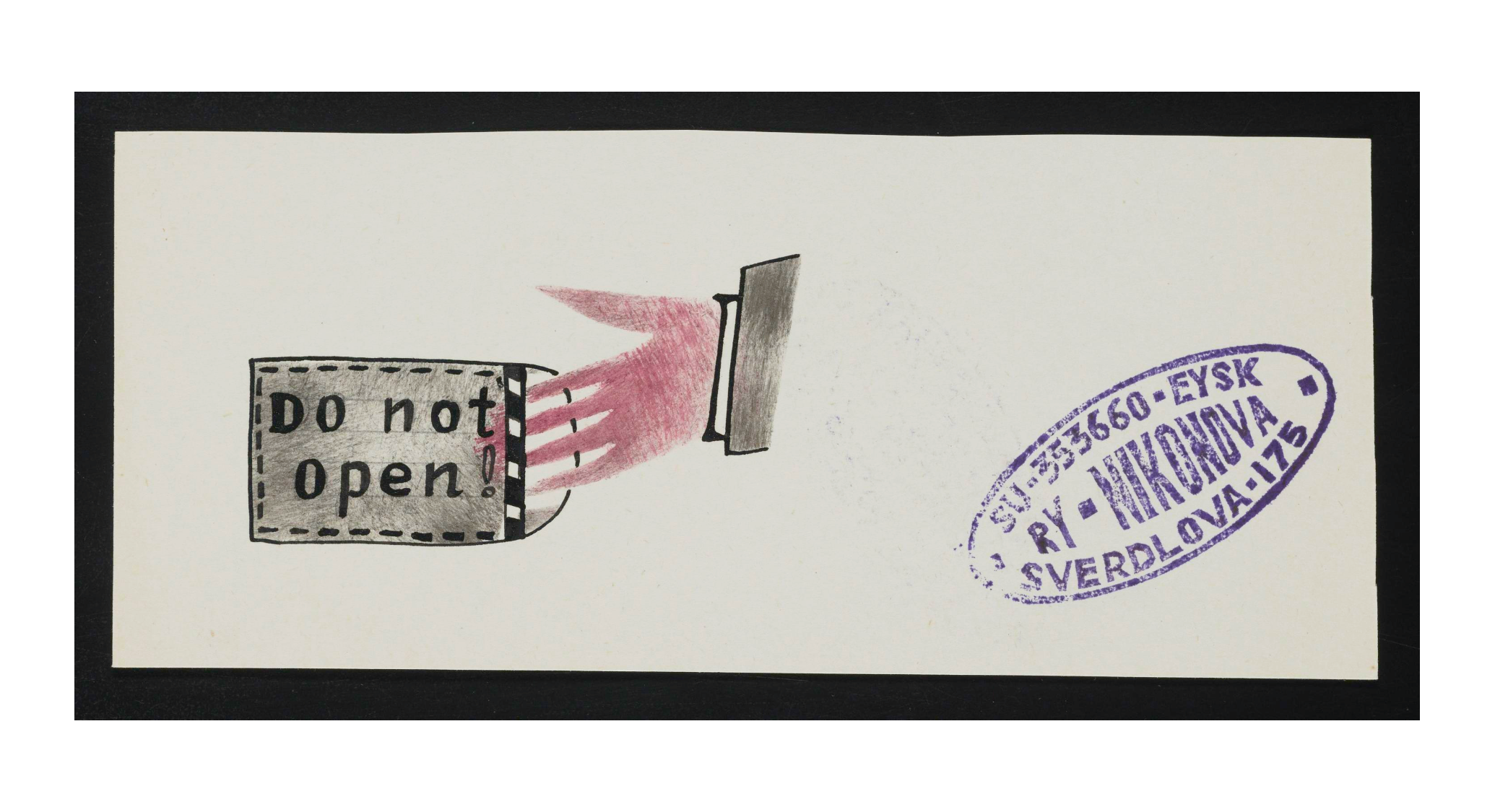
Ry Nikonova mail art to John Held Jr., 1988.

In 1974, she moved to Yeysk with her husband. They started publishing the samizdat journal Transponans in 1979, in five copies. They entertained numerous guests from Moscow and Leningrad, creating art and poetry in collaboration. Their Yeysk abode became the cultural centre for Russian art and literature underground. They also made performances in Leningrad, Tambov, Kiev and Moscow during these years. She became a key thinker in experimental, avant-garde literature - in 1976 she started creating artist books (book-halves, spiral books), in 1978 - first vector poems. A lot of people saw her "gesture poems" during performances in Berlin and Budapest.

Her drawings and paintings during this period are much softer than Serge Segay's, with smooth lines and not many sharp edges. Yet they feel blue, sometimes reflecting "no-escape" reality of living in the USSR, e.g. famous "Life in a Jar" series of drawings.

In 1991, she starts publishing another samizdat journal, "Double".

=== Mail art ===
Ry Nikonova joined the Mail art movement in 1985. In 1989, she organized the "Scarecrow" mail art exhibition in Yeysk. She corresponds with numerous artists around the world, including Robin Crozier, John M. Bennett, Guy Bleus, Shozo Shimamoto and others. She also participates in many Mail art projects.

=== Late period (Kiel) ===
She emigrated to Germany together with her husband in 1998. Initial efforts of integration were thwarted by diagnosis of cancer, which she subsequently fought for 10 years. She participated in Mail art projects, created visual poetry, sound poetry and a few paintings. Most importantly, she continued work on her yet unpublished theoretical tome "The System", which purpose is to enumerate all imaginable styles and approaches to art.

=== Death ===
On 10 March 2014, at the age of 71, Nikonova died in the German city of Kiel. She was buried in the Scottish village of Leslie.

== Exhibitions ==
- Mail Art: The Artists from 25 Countries, Yeysk Art School, Yeysk, Russian SSR (1989)
- First International Exhibition of Concrete Poetry in the USSR, Yeysk State Museum of History and Local Lore, Yeysk, Russian SSR (1990)

== References and sources ==
Sources

- Chuck Welch (Ed.), Eternal Network: A Mail Art Anthology Calgary: University of Calgary Press, 1995. ISBN 1-895176-27-1.
- John Held Jr., Mail Art: An Annotated Bibliography, Metuchen 1991
- Géza Perneczky, The Magazine Network: The Trends of Alternative Art in the Light of Their Periodicals 1968–1988, Köln 1993
