= Oberiu =

Soviet avant-garde collective

OBERIU (Russian: ОБЭРИУ - Объединение реального искусства; English: the Union of Real Art or the Association for Real Art) was a short-lived avant-garde collective of Russian Futurist writers, musicians, and artists in the 1920s and 1930s. The group coalesced in the context of the "intense centralization of Soviet Culture" and the decline of the avant garde culture of Leningrad, as "leftist" groups were becoming increasingly marginalized.

Founded in 1927 by Daniil Kharms and Alexander Vvedensky, OBERIU became notorious for provocative performances which included circus-like stunts, readings of what was perceived as nonsensical verse, and theatrical presentations, such as Kharms's Elizabeth Bam, that foreshadowed the European Theatre of the Absurd. The presentations took place in venues ranging from theaters and university auditoriums to dormitories and prisons. The group's actions were derided as "literary hooliganism" in the ever-more conservative press of the late 1920s. It was chastised even more in the early 1930s, and many of its associates were arrested. The OBERIU has often been called "the last Soviet avant-garde."

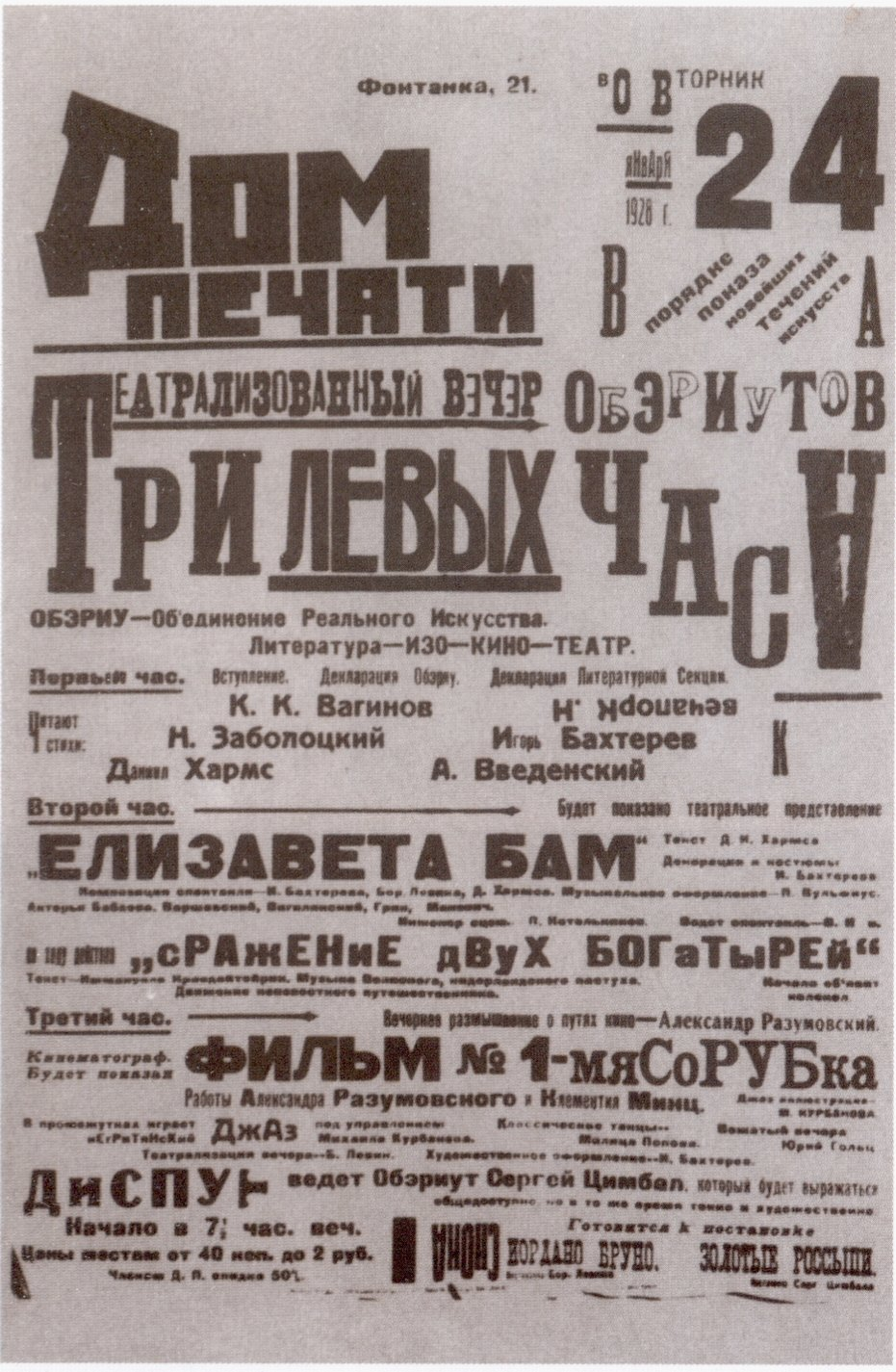
Poster of the OBERIU poetic event "Three Left Hours", january 1928. Author Daniil Kharms.

== Origins ==
Some scholars say that the OBERIU manifesto was penned mostly by the poet Nikolay Zabolotsky with the help of Kharms. The core of the group included Daniil Kharms, Alexander Vvedensky, Nikolay Zabolotsky, Konstantin Vaginov, Igor Bekhterev (ru), Yury Vladimirov (ru), and others, including actors, musicians and filmmakers.

The Russian artist Kazimir Malevich gave the OBERIU shelter in his newly created arts institute, letting them rehearse in one of the auditoriums. It is reported that he said to the young "Oberiuty" (as they are called in Russian): "You are young trouble makers, and I am an old one. Let's see what we can do." Malevich also gifted a book of his own ("God Is Not Cast Down") to founder Daniil Kharms with the relevant inscription "Go and stop progress!"

== Decline ==
In the 1930s, Socialist Realism and Stalin's purges precluded the formation of any such "leftist" or "radical" public artistic groupings. After about 1931, The OBERIU held no more public performances, and most of those involved showed their writing only to a small circle of friends, though Zabolotsky went on to become a marginally accepted Soviet poet.

Though the group was held together for a while by common interest, some split away. Zabolotsky seems to have had a falling out with Vvedensky. In the 1930s Kharms and Vvedensky became more closely involved with a group of friends who met semi-regularly for what they called "conversations." Yakov Druskin, a Christian philosopher and music-theorist (he wrote on Bach, Schoenberg and Webern), was a key member of this group. Druskin and his friend Leonid Lipavsky (a children's writer under the name of Leonid Savelyev, and an amateur mathematician and author of philosophical tracts) had known Alexander Vvedensky in high-school, and had become friends with Kharms and Zabolotsky as well. Lipavsky actually wrote down a number of the "conversations." Nikolay Oleynikov, an editor at the children's publishing house which had long employed the young poets of the OBERIU as writers and translators of children's literature, became part of this group by the mid-thirties.

This later grouping, which had no public outlet, is generally called the "chinari" (i.e. "the titled ones") group in Russian literary scholarship, though it is uncertain that they ever formalized a name for the group, nor that they called themselves "chinari" with any consistency. Thus, the names "OBERIU" and "chinari" are somewhat interchangeable in the scholarship. The borders between the two groups are (and were) permeable, and the only basic continuity is the presence of Kharms and Vvedensky.

== Influence ==
Though short-lived, the OBERIU seems to have had lasting effects on Russian culture. Since the late 1980s a kind of cult fervor has grown in Russia around these long-forgotten writers. And, in fact, the ideas and art of the OBERIU had been influential even in the 1960s and 1970s, in what is called the "unofficial" art world of the Soviet Union. Some writers and artists of that period would proudly admit the influence of the OBERIU, in others it is clear enough. The OBERIU was seen as something of a missing link from the old Russian avant-garde to the new one. Poets like Genrikh Sapgir, Alexei Khvostenko, Anri Volokhonsky, Lev Rubinstein, Dmitri Prigov, Timur Kibirov, Eduard Limonov were certainly familiar with the OBERIU writers through "samizdat" publications circulating in the underground art scene, and their writing reflects that knowledge, though in very different ways for all of them. Leningrad avant garde musical group N.O.M. borrows heavily from OBERIU movement citing Kharms and Oleynikov as lyrical influences. They paid homage to Kharms, Oleynikov by releasing An Album Of Real Art with songs based on their lyrics. Omsk punk rock musician Yegor Letov cited Vvedensky as an influence for his lyrics.

== In English ==
An anglophone edition of OBERIU writings translated by Eugene Ostashevsky, Matvei Yankelevich, Genya Turovskaya, Thomas Epstein and Ilya Bernstein was published by the Northwestern University Press in 2006. Several translations of Kharms's short stories, notebooks, letters, poems and diaries have been published over the years, for instance by George Gibian (Norton Library, 1974), Matvei Yankelevich (Overlook Press, 2007), Anthony Anemone and Peter Scotto (Academic Studies Press, 2013) and most recently Alex Cigale (Northwestern University Press, 2017). Kharms's poems were also translated by Roman Turovsky. Poems by Kharms (8), Vvedensky (1) and Zabolotsky (6) are included in The Penguin Book of Russian Poetry edited by Robert Chandler, Boris Dralyuk and Irina Mashinski published 2015.

== References and sources ==
Sources

- Jaccard, Jean-Philippe. 'De la realite au texte: l'absurde chez Daniil Harms', Cahiers du monde russe et sovietique, 27 (1985), 269-312
- Jaccard, Jean-Philippe. Daniil Kharms et la fin de l 'avant-garde russe. Bern: Peter Lang, 1991.
- Kasack, Wolfgang (1988) [1976]. Dictionary of Russian literature Since 1917. Translated by Maria Carlson and Jane T. Hedges. New York: Columbia University Press. ISBN 0-2310-5242-1.
