= Aleksei Kruchyonykh =

Russian futurist poet and artist

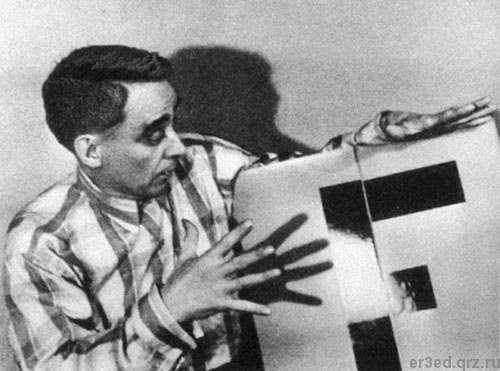
- Born: Aleksei Yeliseyevich Kruchonykh; 9 February 1886; Olevka, Kherson Governorate, Russian Empire (now Kherson oblast, Ukraine)
- Died: 17 June 1968 (aged 82); Moscow, Russian SFSR, Soviet Union
- Known for: Poetry, collage, artist's book
- Notable work: Universal War, 1916
- Movement: Russian Futurism, Zaum

Aleksei Yeliseyevich Kruchyonykh (Russian: Алексе́й Елисе́евич Кручёных; 9 February 1886 – 17 June 1968). Original name at birth (Ukrainian: Олексій Єлисейович Кручений) also romanized Kruchenykh due to confusion about ⟨ё⟩, was a poet, artist, and theorist, perhaps one of the most radical poets of Russian Futurism, a movement that included Vladimir Mayakovsky, David Burliuk and others. Born in 1886, he lived in the time of the Russian Silver Age of literature, and together with Velimir Khlebnikov, another Russian Futurist, Kruchenykh is considered the inventor of zaum, a poetry style utilising nonsense words. Kruchonykh wrote the libretto for the Futurist opera Victory Over the Sun, with sets provided by Kazimir Malevich. In 1912, he wrote the poem Dyr bul shchyl; four years later, in 1916, he created his most famous book, Universal War.

He is also known for his Declaration of the Word as Such (1913): "The worn-out, violated word "lily" is devoid of all expression. Therefore I call the lily éuy – and original purity is restored."

== Biography ==
Kruchonykh was born on 21 February 1886, in the Kherson region of the Russian Empire; his parents were peasants. With the intention of becoming an artist, he went to Odessa Art School and the Moscow School of Painting, Sculpture and Architecture, publishing caricatures and occasionally exhibiting to make a living, but changed his mind in 1912 to be a poet instead.

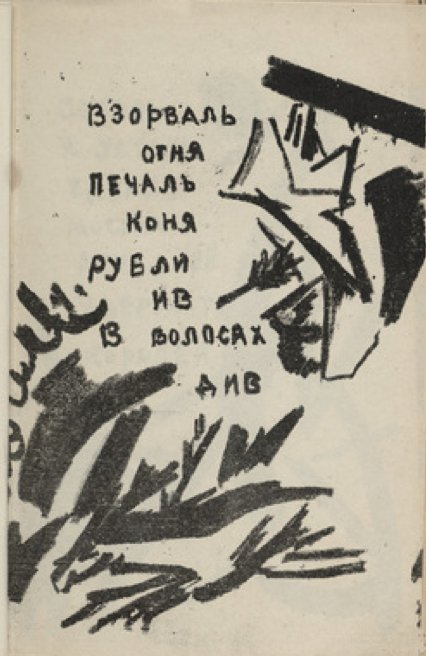
Page from Explodity (1913) by Kruchenykh. Illustration by Olga Rozanova

Soon after he met the Burliuk brothers, he became a major poet of Cubo-Futurism, a style he helped to launch with his friends David Burliuk, Vladimir Mayakovsky, Mikhail Larionov, and others. He helped write the drafts for the most famous Cubo-Futurist manifesto, A Slap in the Face of Public Taste, published in 1912, notable for its statement to throw the writers of old "off the steamboat of modernity". The first example of zaum poetry was by him; called Dyr bul shchyl, it was published in a 1913 book called Pomada. Together with Velemir Khlebnikov, he is considered inventor of this poetry style. Kruchenykh was also the first Russian poet to try writing a poem only using vowels. Soon he became one of the most prolific Cubo-Futurist writers, alongside Elena Guro, Khlebnikov, and others. The books were often lithographed by hand, illustrated by fellow Futurists, and titles included A Little Duck's Nest of... Bad Words, Hermits: a Poem, Worldbackwards, and Explodity. They were also sometimes in collaboration with each other; for example, with Olga Rozanova, he invented the samopismo, a kind of Futurist book where text and images are literally connected.

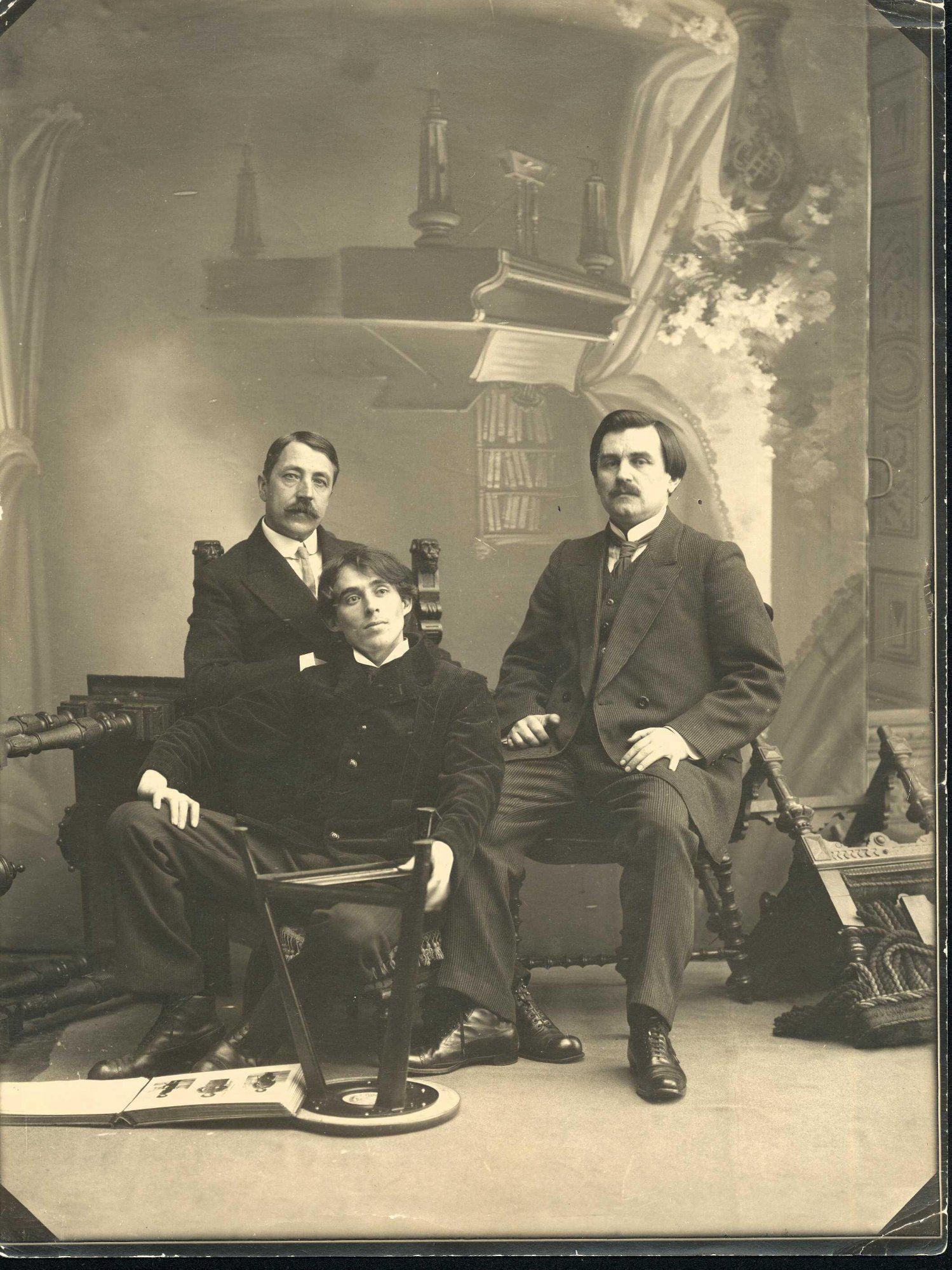
Mikhail Matyushin (left), Kruchenykh (middle) and Kazimir Malevich (right) at the First All-Russian Congregation of the Bards of the Future (The Futurist Poets) meeting in March 1912. Photo by Karl Bulla.

He went to the house of the composer Mikhail Matyushin with Kazimir Malevich that summer (Khlebnikov was supposed to visit him too, but he lost the cheque to pay for his train ticket that Matyushin had sent him); they collaborated to write the Futurist opera Victory over the Sun, with music by Matyushin, prologue by Khlebnikov, libretto by Kruchenykh, and set designs by Malevich. This opera remains his most famous work; it is about a group of Futurists who capture the sun and defy gravity, much to the annoyance to everybody else. It premiered at the Luna Park Theatre at St. Petersburg, in a performance organised by the Union of the Youth. This play was written in a sort of zaum, the costumes were of cardboard, and a real aeroplane and aviator made an appearance; the audience booed throughout the show, and overall it caused great outrage. He, like his friends, also caused shock when he took to lecturing and poetry recitals, and on one occasion, he had to use his shoes to fight back the enraged audience from leaping up and attacking him. Another time, he spilled tea over many of the audience, an event which was probably intentional. Universal War was published in 1916; he illustrated it himself, with abstract collages. During the war he served as a technical draftsman.

Shortly after the October Revolution of 1917, he moved to Tiflis, Georgia, as part of a railway construction team; with his friend the Georgian Cubo-Futurist Ilia Zdanevich, who also happened to be in the country, they founded the avant-garde group 41° (the number refers to the temperature of a high fever). There, also, somebody founded an institute devoted to the study of his work and life so far, but this was probably just a joke. After Zdanevich left Georgia (first to Turkey, then to France), Kruchenykh returned to Russia in 1921, publishing more books, writing essays, and lecturing with friends; his views soon became so shocking the authorities decided to restrict his access to publishers, so he made his books himself. When the Soviets banned the avant-garde, he got a job as an archivist and gave up poetry. He also collected and sold rare books and manuscripts written by the people of his generation, eventually falling into obscurity with only occasional acknowledgment from the public. In 1932 he wrote his memoirs. He died of pneumonia in 1968.

== Legacy ==
The Russian punk band Instruktsiya po Vyzhivaniyu have a reggae-styled song called "Posveshtenie A. Kruchyonykh" (Homage to A. Kruchyonykh), later covered by Grazhdanskaya Oborona on their album Instruktsiya po vyzhivaniyu.

== See also ==
- Roman Jakobson
- Velimir Khlebnikov
- Mikhail Larionov
- Cubo-Futurism
