= Russian Futurism =

Literary and artistic movement in Russia

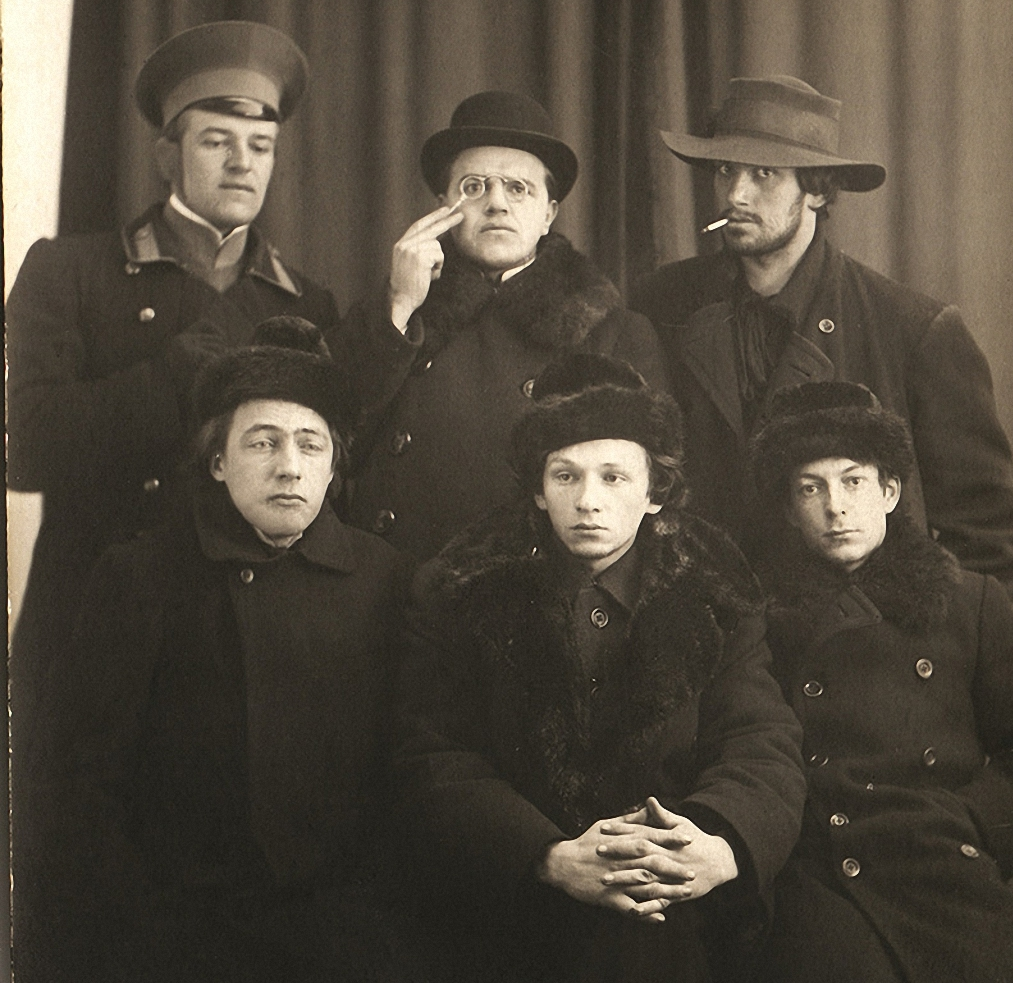
Photo for the manifesto “A Slap in the Face of Public Taste” Sitting: V.Khlebnikov, G.Kuzmin, S.Dolinsky Standing:N.Burliuk, D. Burliuk, V. Mayakovsky

Russian Futurism is the broad term for a movement of Russian poets and artists who adopted the principles of Filippo Marinetti's "Manifesto of Futurism", which espoused the rejection of the past, and a celebration of speed, machinery, violence, youth, industry, destruction of academies, museums, and urbanism; it also advocated for modernization and cultural rejuvenation.

Russian Futurism began roughly in the early 1910s; in 1912, a year after Ego-Futurism began, the literary group "Hylea"—also spelt "Guilée" and "Gylea"—issued the book and the manifesto A Slap in the Face of Public Taste. The book included texts and poems of David Burliuk, Nikolai Burliuk, Aleksei Kruchenykh, Wassily Kandinsky, Benedikt Livshits, Vladimir Mayakovsky, Velimir Khlebnikov and was issued with a support of George Kuzmin and Sergey Dolinsky as well as the futuristic manifesto. The 1912 movement was originally called Cubo-Futurism, but this term is now used to refer to the style of art produced. Russian Futurism ended shortly after the Russian Revolution of 1917, after which former Russian Futurists either left the country, or participated in the new art movements.

Notable Russian Futurists included Natalia Goncharova, Mikhail Larionov, David Burliuk, Kazimir Malevich, Vladimir Mayakovsky, and Velimir Khlebnikov.

== Style ==
The Manifesto celebrated the "beauty of speed" and the machine as the new aesthetic. Marinetti explained the "beauty of speed" as "a roaring automobile is more beautiful than the Winged Victory" further asserting the movement towards the future. Artforms were greatly affected by the Russian Futurism movement within Russia, with its influences being seen in cinema, literature, typography, politics, and propaganda. The Russian Futuristic movement saw its demise in the early 1920s.

== Name ==
Initially the term "futurism" was problematic, because it reminded them too much of their rivals in Italy; however, in 1911, the Ego-futurist group began. This was the first group of Russian futurism to call themselves "futurist"; shortly afterwards, many other futurists followed in using the term.

== Origins ==
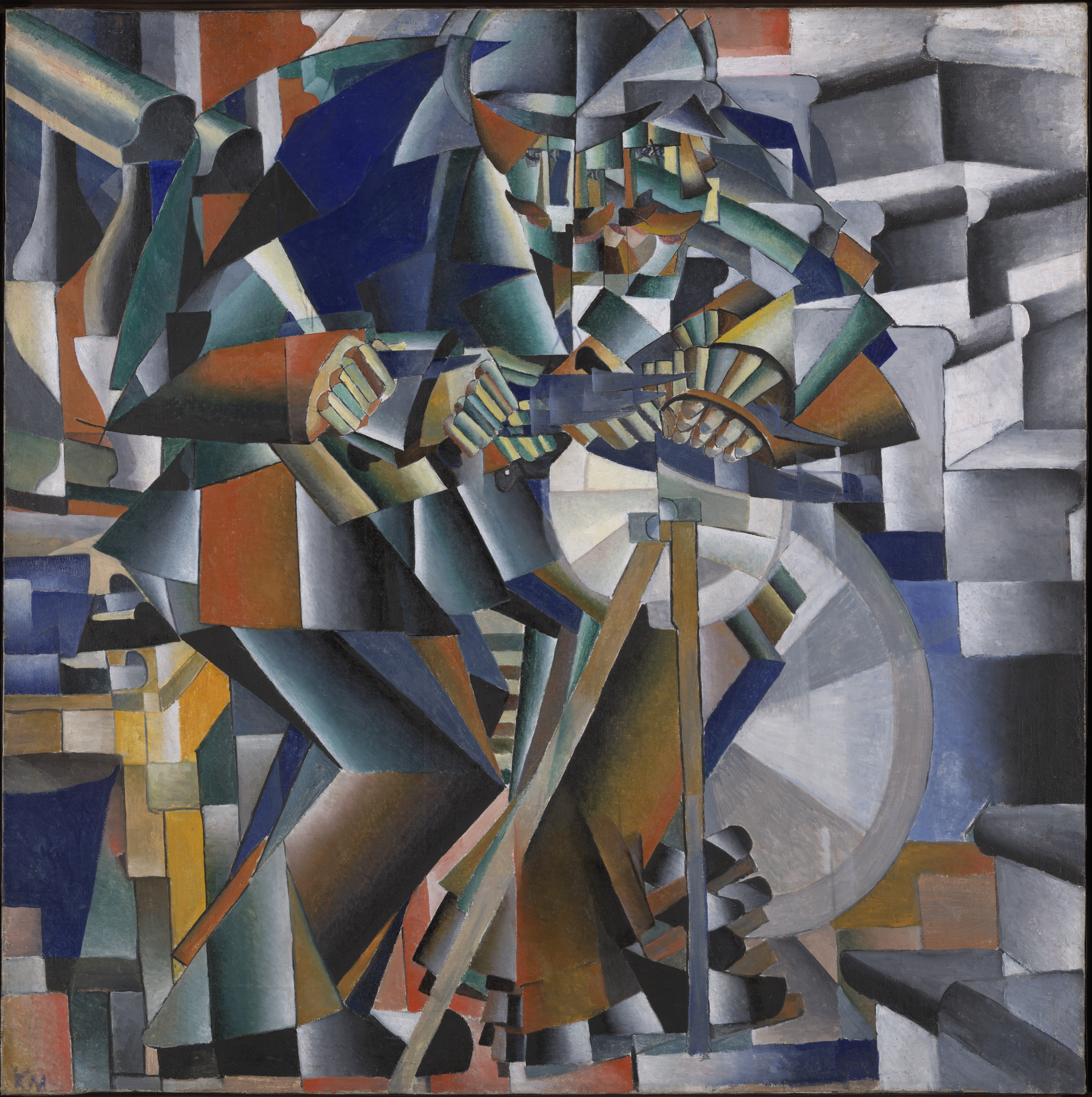
The Knifegrinder (1912–13), by Kazimir Malevich, is an example how Cubism and Futurism crossed over to create Cubo-Futurism, a combined art form.

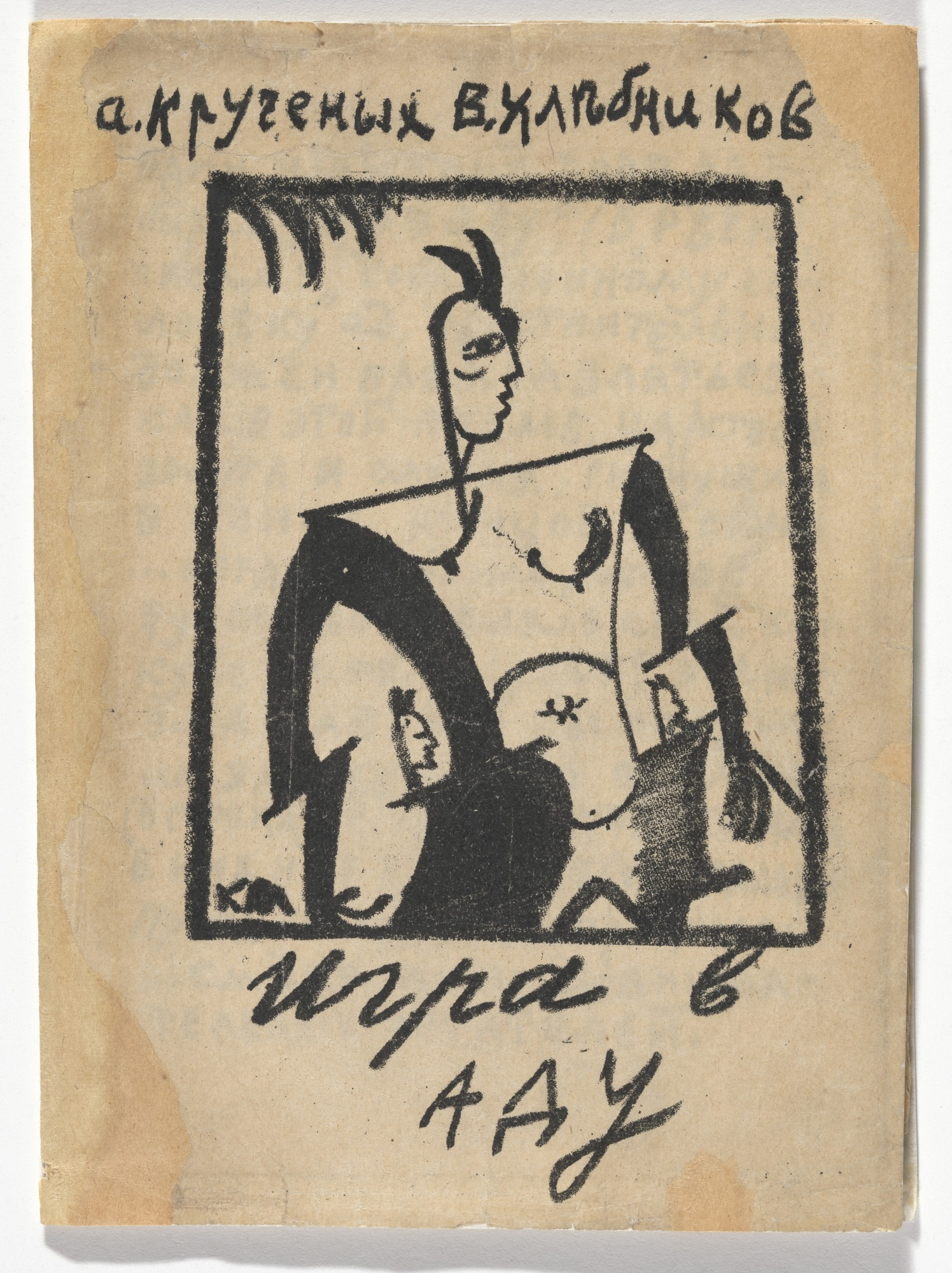
Игра в Аду (A Game in Hell; Moscow 1914 edition) is an example of the collaborations of Futurist writers and visual artists. It fused Khlebnikov and Kruchenykh's poems with Malevich and Rozanova's bold imagery.

The most important group of Russian Futurism may be said to have been born in December 1912, when the Moscow-based literary group Hylaea (Russian: Гилея [Gileya]) (initiated in 1910 by David Burlyuk and his brothers at their estate near Kherson, and quickly joined by Vasily Kamensky and Velimir Khlebnikov, with Aleksey Kruchenykh and Vladimir Mayakovsky in 1911) issued a manifesto entitled A Slap in the Face of Public Taste (Russian: Пощёчина общественному вкусу). The Russian Futurist Manifesto shared similar ideas to Marinetti's Manifesto, such as the rejection of old literature for the new and unexpected.

In addition to the forenamed authors, the group included artists Mikhail Larionov, Natalia Goncharova, Kazimir Malevich, and Olga Rozanova.

Although Hylaea is generally considered to be the most influential group of Russian Futurism, other groups were formed in St. Petersburg (Igor Severyanin's Ego-Futurists), Moscow (Tsentrifuga, with Boris Pasternak among its members), Kiev, Kharkiv, and Odessa. While many artforms and artists converged to create "Russian Futurism", David Burlyuk (born 1882, Ukraine) is credited with publicizing the avant-garde movement and increasing its renown within Europe and the United States. Burlyuk was a Russian poet, critic, and publisher who centralized the Russian movement. While his contribution to the arts were lesser than his peers, he was the first to discover many of the talented poets and artists associated with the movement. Burlyuk was the first to publish Velimir Khlebnikov and to celebrate the Futurist poetry of Vladimir Mayakovsky. Russian futurism also adopted ideas from "French Cubism" which coined the name "Cubo-Futurists" given by an art critic in 1913. Cubo-futurism adopted ideas from "Italian Futurism" and "French Cubism" to create its own blended style of visual art. It emphasized the breakdown of forms, the use of various viewpoints, the intersection of spatial planes, and the contrast of colour and texture. The focus was to show the intrinsic value of a painting, without it being dependent on a narrative.

== Modernity ==
Like their Italian counterparts, the Russian Futurists were fascinated with the dynamism, speed, and restlessness of modern machines and urban life. They purposely sought to arouse controversy and to gain publicity by repudiating the static art of the past. The likes of Pushkin and Dostoevsky, according to A Slap in the Face of Public Taste, should be "heaved overboard from the steamship of modernity". They acknowledged no authorities whatsoever; even Filippo Tommaso Marinetti, when he arrived in Russia on a proselytizing visit in 1914, was obstructed by most Russian Futurists, who did not profess to owe him anything.

== Cinema ==
Russian Futurist cinema refers to the futurist movement in Soviet cinema. Russian Futurist cinema was deeply influenced by the films of Italian futurism (1916–1919) most of which are lost today. Some of the film directors identified as part of this movement are Lev Kuleshov, Dziga Vertov, Sergei Eisenstein, Vsevolod Pudovkin and Aleksandr Dovzhenko. Sergei Eisenstein's film Strike was seen as "the mordern Futurist art form par excellence" by Olga Bulgakowa. Bulgakowa theorized how the camera could change one's perceptions of reality and how it could make it seem like time was speeding up or slowing down during the film.

== Literature and typography ==
In contrast to Marinetti's circle, Russian Futurism was primarily a literary rather than a plastic philosophy. Although many poets (Mayakovsky, Burlyuk) dabbled with painting, their interests were primarily literary. However, such well-established artists as Mikhail Larionov, Natalia Goncharova, and Kazimir Malevich found inspiration in the refreshing imagery of Futurist poems and experimented with versification themselves. The poets and painters collaborated on such innovative productions as the Futurist opera Victory Over the Sun, with music by Mikhail Matyushin, texts by Kruchenykh and sets contributed by Malevich.

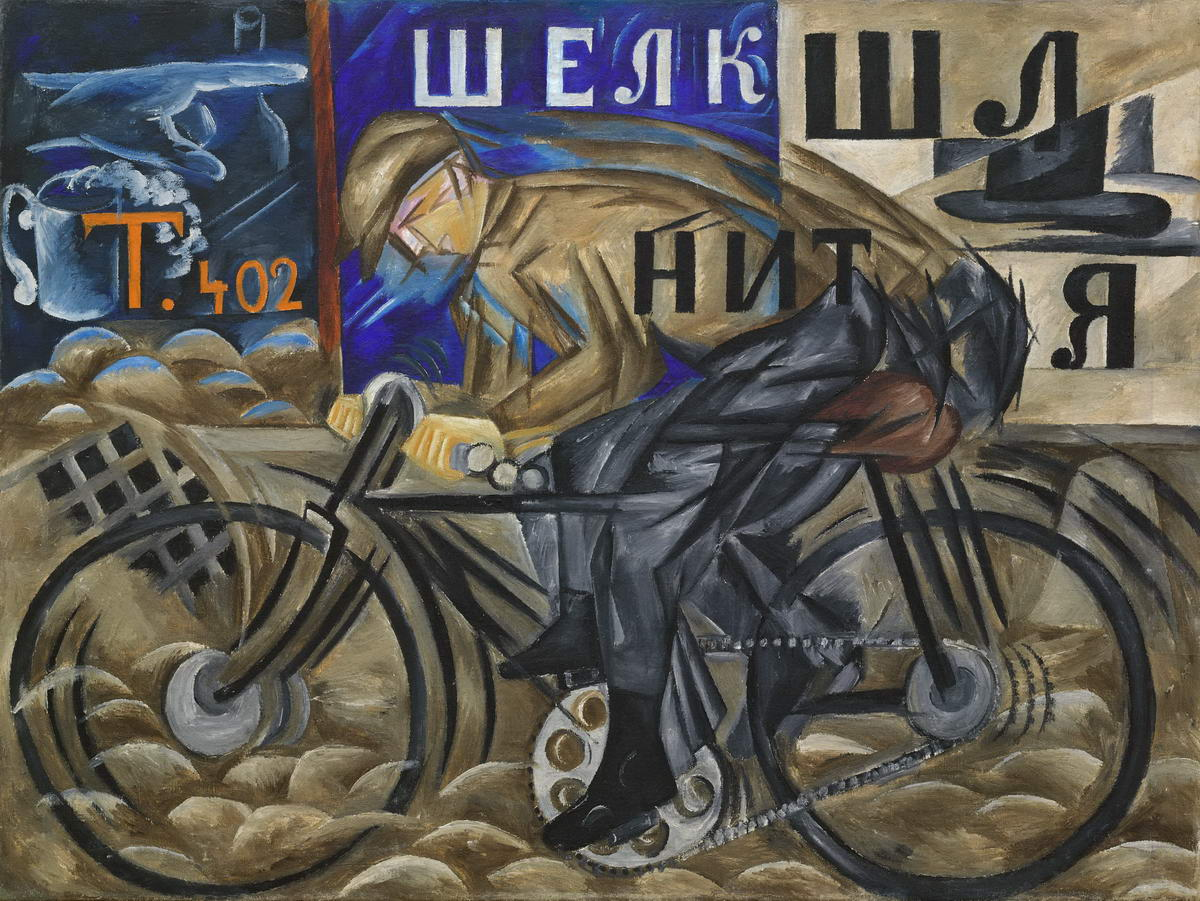
Cyclist (1913) by Natalia Goncharova. This painting is an example of how Russian Futurism affected her later works.

Members of Hylaea elaborated the doctrine of Cubo-Futurism and assumed the name of budetlyane (from the Russian word budet 'will be'). They found significance in the shape of letters, in the arrangement of text around the page, in the details of typography. They considered that there is no substantial difference between words and material things, hence the poet should arrange words in his poems like the artist arranges colors and lines on his canvas. Grammar, syntax, and logic were often discarded; many neologisms and profane words were introduced; onomatopoeia was declared a universal texture of verse. Khlebnikov, in particular, developed "an incoherent and anarchic blend of words stripped of their meaning and used for their sound alone", known as zaum.

== Politics ==
With all this emphasis on formal experimentation, some Futurists were not indifferent to politics. In particular, Mayakovsky's poems, with their lyrical sensibility, appealed to a broad range of readers. He vehemently opposed the meaningless slaughter of World War I and hailed the Russian Revolution as the end of that traditional mode of life which he and other Futurists ridiculed so zealously. Although never a member of the Russian Communist Party (RKP(b)), he was active in early 1919 in the attempt to set up Komfut as an organisation promoting Futurism affiliated to the Viborg District Branch of the Party.

== The Bolshevik Agit-trains ==
War correspondent Arthur Ransome and five other foreigners were taken to see two of the Bolshevik propaganda trains in 1919 by their organiser, Burov. The organiser first showed them the "Lenin", which had been painted a year and a half ago

when, as fading hoardings in the streets of Moscow still testify, revolutionary art was dominated by the Futurist movement. Every carriage is decorated with most striking but not very comprehensible pictures in the brightest colours, and the proletariat was called upon to enjoy what the pre-revolutionary artistic public had for the most part failed to understand. Its pictures are 'art for arts sake', and can not have done more than astonish, and perhaps terrify, the peasants and the workmen of the country towns who had the luck to see them.

The "Red Cossack" was quite different. As Burov put it with deep satisfaction, "At first we were in the artists' hands, and now the artists are in our hands". Initially the artists were so revolutionary that at one point Burov had delivered the Department of Proletarian Culture some Futurists "bound hand and foot", but now "the artists had been brought under proper control".

The other three trains were the "Sverdlov", the "October Revolution", and the "Red East".

== Demise ==
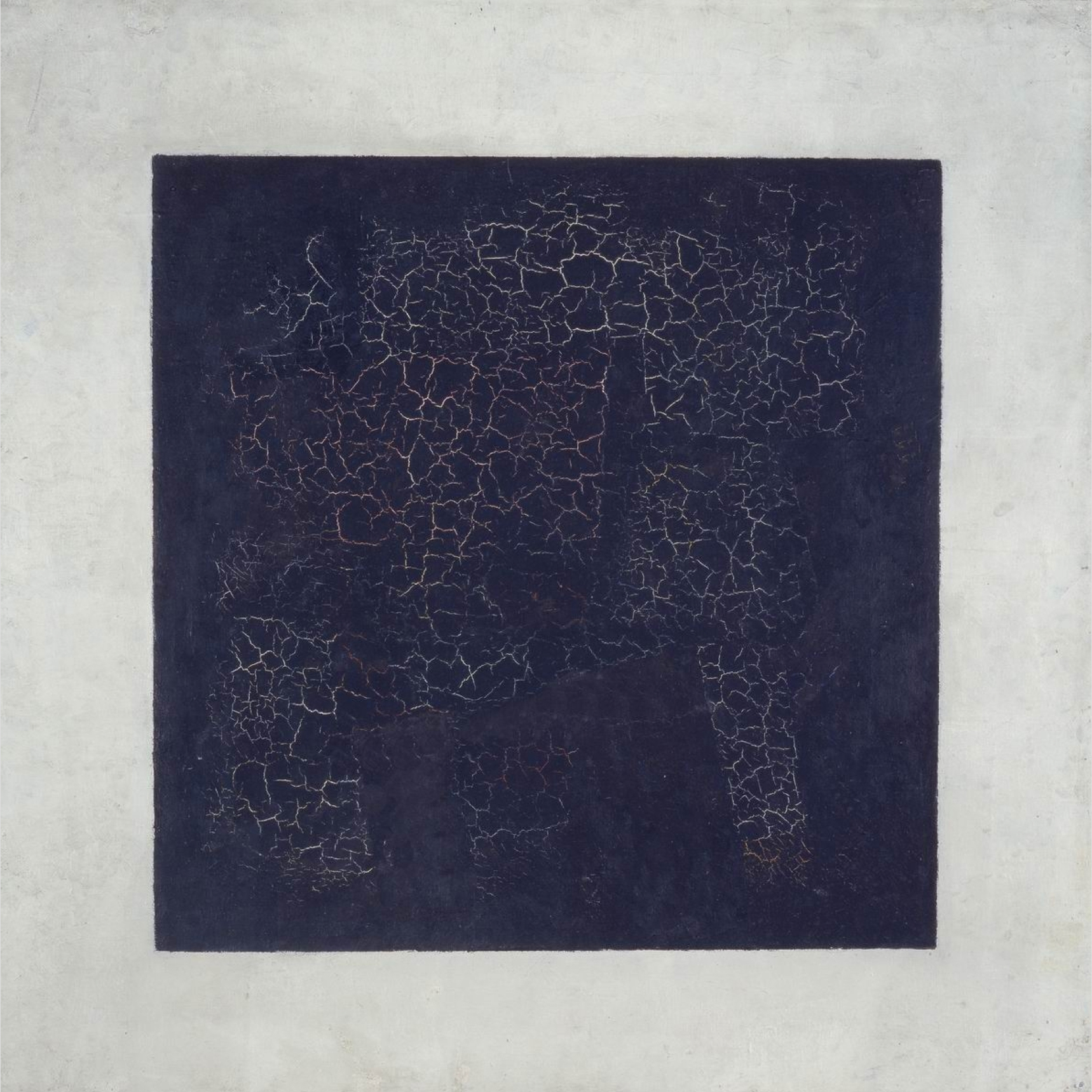
Black Square (1915), by Kazimir Malevich, was featured at the 0,10 Exhibition, the last exhibition of Russian Futurist paintings. The exhibition was held from 19 December 1915 to 17 January 1916.

After the Bolsheviks gained power, Mayakovsky's group—patronized by Anatoly Lunacharsky, Bolshevik Commissar for Education—aspired to dominate Soviet culture. Their influence was paramount during the first years after the revolution, until their program—or rather lack thereof—was subjected to scathing criticism by authorities. In December 1920 the Central Committee of the Communist Party officially condemned Futurism among the artistic movements that were "hostile to Marxism". By the time OBERIU attempted to revive some of the Futurist tenets during the late 1920s, the Futurist movement in Russia had already ended. The most militant Futurist poets either died (Khlebnikov, Mayakovsky) or preferred to adjust their very individual style to more conventional requirements and trends (Aseyev, Pasternak). The decline of futurism can also be seen in Russia when Kruchenykh attempted to publish Fifteen Years of Russian Futurism 1912-1927 in 1928 and the Communist Party made it clear they did not want any futurist influence in Soviet literature. This marked an abrupt fall from grace for Kruchenykh's writing and futurism as a literary movement.

== See also ==
- Futurism
- Russian avant-garde
- Ego-Futurism
- Russian cosmism
- Universal Flowering
- Cubo-Futurism

== References and sources ==
Sources

- Markov, Vladimir (1968). Russian Futurism: a History. Berkeley; Los Angeles, Ca: University of California Press.
- Petrova, Ye (2000) Russkiy futurizm ('Russian Futurism'). SPb.
- V. N. Terekhina, A. P. Zimenkov (1999) Russkiy futurizm. Teoriya. Praktika. Kritika. Vospominaniya. ('Russian Futurism. Theory. Practice. Criticism. Memoir.'). Nasledie: Moscow.
