= Daniil Kharms =

Russian writer (1905–1942)

- Даниил Иванович Хармс
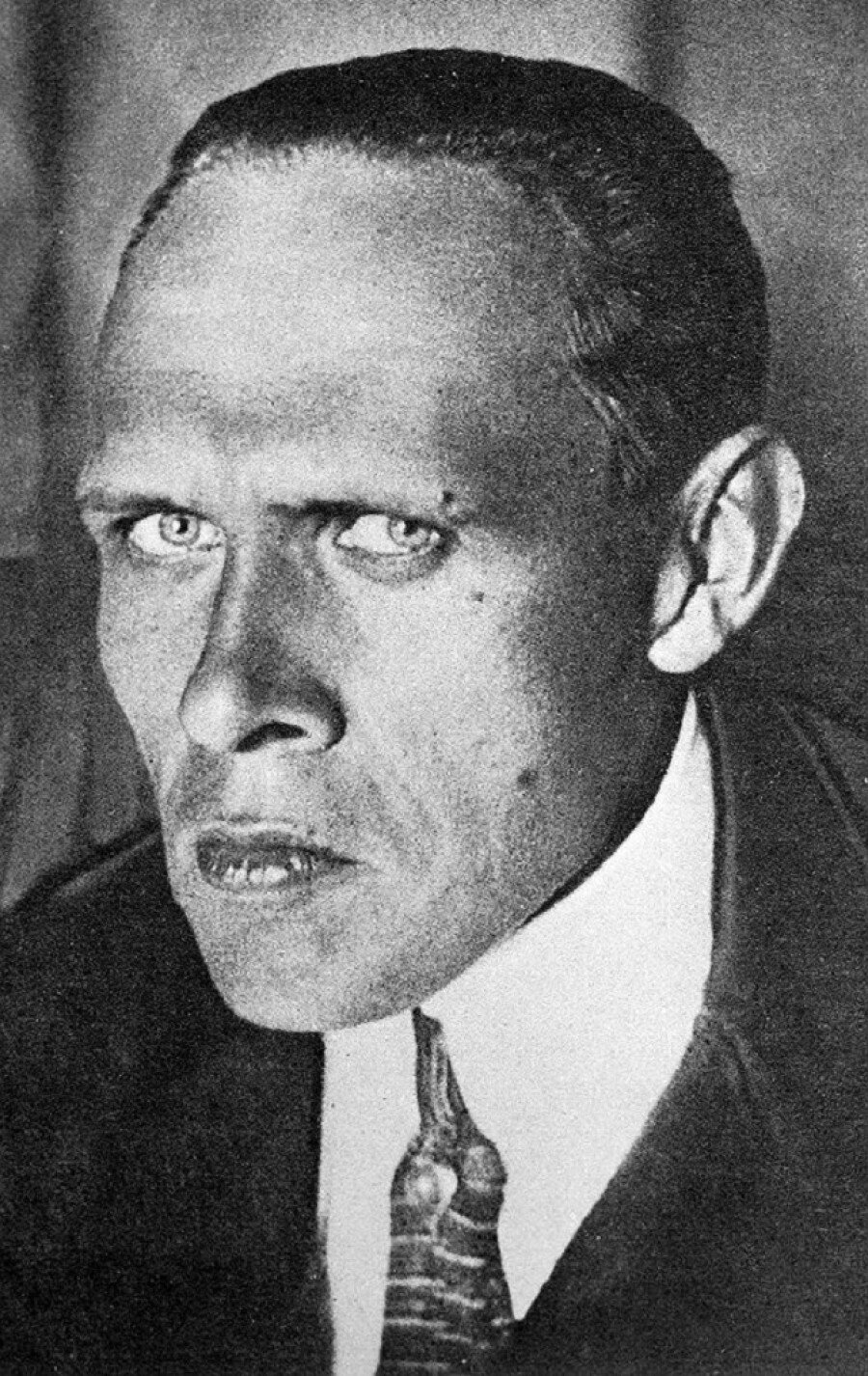
- Kharms in 1932
- Born: Daniil Ivanovich Yuvachev; 30 December 1905; Saint Petersburg, Russian Empire
- Died: 2 February 1942 (aged 36); Leningrad, Russian SFSR, Soviet Union
- Occupations: Poet; writer; dramatist
- Relatives: Ivan Yuvachev (father)
- Writing career
- Notable works: Incidences; The Old Woman
- Movements: Oberiu, absurdism, surrealism

Daniil Ivanovich Kharms (né Yuvachev; Russian: Даниил Иванович Хармс; 30 December [O.S. 17 December] 1905 – 2 February 1942) was a Russian avant-gardist and absurdist poet, writer and dramatist in the early Soviet era.

== Early years ==
Kharms was born as Daniil Yuvachev (Ювачёв) in Saint Petersburg, then the capital of the Russian Empire, into the family of Ivan Yuvachev, a member of the revolutionary group Narodnaya Volya. By the time of his son's birth, Ivan Yuvachev had already been imprisoned for his involvement in subversive acts against Tsar Alexander III and had become a philosopher.

Daniil invented the pseudonym Kharms while attending Saint Peter's School. While at Saint Peter's, he learned the rudiments of both English and German, and it may have been the English words "harm" and "charm" that he incorporated into "Kharms". His pseudonym might have been also influenced by his fascination with Arthur Conan Doyle's Sherlock Holmes, as the two words (Holmes and Harms) start and end similarly; but there are a number of other theories regarding the pseudonym. Throughout his career, Kharms used variations on this name and the pseudonyms DanDan, Khorms, Charms, Shardam, and Kharms-Shardam, among others.

In 1924, he entered the Leningrad Electrotechnicum, from which he was expelled for "poor attendance," "not participating in community service," and not "fitting into the class physiologically".

== Career ==
After his expulsion, Kharms gave himself over entirely to literature. He joined the circle of Aleksandr Tufanov, a sound-poet, and follower of Velimir Khlebnikov's ideas of zaum (or trans-sense) poetry. He met the young poet Alexander Vvedensky at this time, and the two became close friends and collaborators.

In 1927, the Association of Writers of Children's Literature was formed, and Kharms was invited to be a member. From 1928 until 1941, Kharms continually produced children's works, to great success.

In 1928, Kharms founded the avant-garde collective Oberiu, or Union of Real Art. He embraced the new movements of Russian Futurism laid out by his idols, Khlebnikov, Kazimir Malevich, and Igor Terentiev, among others. Their ideas served as a springboard. His aesthetic centered around a belief in the autonomy of art from real world rules and logic, and that intrinsic meaning is to be found in objects and words outside of their practical function.

In 1928, his play Elizaveta Bam premiered; it is said to have foreshadowed the Theatre of the Absurd. The play begins with Elizaveta being arrested by the secret police for the murder of one of the arresting officers, who is later killed by another character, and ends with the first scene repeating. It has been compared to Kafka's Trial and Nabokov's Invitation to a Beheading for its "depiction of a hapless individual destroyed by arbitrary governmental authority."

By the late 1920s, his anti-rational verse, nonlinear theatrical performances, and public displays of decadent and illogical behavior earned Kharms – who dressed like an English dandy with a calabash pipe – the reputation of a talented and highly eccentric writer.

In the late 1920s, despite rising criticism of the Oberiu performances and diatribes against the avant-garde in the press, Kharms sought to unite progressive artists and writers of the time (Malevich, Filonov, Terentiev, Vladimir Mayakovsky, Kaverin, Zamyatin) with leading Russian formalist critics (Viktor Shklovsky, Yuri Tynianov, Boris Eichenbaum, Lev S. Ginzburg, etc.) and a younger generation of writers (all from the OBERIU crowd: Alexander Vvedensky, Konstantin Vaginov, Nikolai Zabolotsky, Igor Bakhterev), to form a cohesive cultural movement of Left Art.

Kharms was arrested in 1931 and exiled to Kursk for most of a year. He was arrested as a member of "a group of anti-Soviet children's writers", and some of his works were used as evidence in the case. Soviet authorities, having become increasingly hostile toward the avant-garde in general, deemed Kharms' writing for children anti-Soviet because of its refusal to instil materialist and social Soviet values. Kharms continued to write for children's magazines when he returned from exile, though his name would appear in the credits less often. His plans for more performances and plays were curtailed, the OBERIU disbanded, and Kharms receded into a mostly private writing life.

In the 1930s, as mainstream Soviet literature was becoming more and more conservative under the guidelines of Socialist Realism, Kharms found refuge in children's literature. (He had worked under Samuil Marshak at Detgiz, the state-owned children's publishing house, since the mid-1920s, writing new material and translating children's literature from the west, including Wilhelm Busch's Max and Moritz.) Many of his poems and short stories for children were published in the Chizh (Чиж), Yozh (Ëж), Sverchok (Сверчок) and Oktyabryata (Октябрята) magazines. In 1937 Marshak's publishing house in Leningrad was shut down and some of its employees were arrested: Alexandr Vvedensky, Nikolai Oleinikov, Nikolai Zabolotsky, Tamara Gabbe, and, later, Kharms; the majority were fired.

== Death ==
On 23 August 1941, Kharms was arrested for spreading "libellous and defeatist mood", basing on a report of an anonymous informant. To avoid execution, Kharms simulated insanity; the military tribunal ordered him to be kept in the psychiatric ward of Kresty Prison due to the severity of the crime. Daniil Kharms died of starvation on 2 February 1942 during the siege of Leningrad. His wife was informed that he had been deported to Novosibirsk. Only on 25 July 1960, at the request of Kharms' sister, E.I. Gritsina, did the Prosecutor General's Office find him not guilty, and he was exonerated.

== Legacy ==
His "adult" works were not published during his lifetime with the sole exception of two early poems. His notebooks were saved from destruction in the war by loyal friends and hidden until the 1960s, when his children's writing became widely published and scholars began the job of recovering his manuscripts and publishing them in the west and in samizdat.

His reputation in the 20th century in Russia was largely based on his popular work for children. His other writings (a vast assortment of stories, miniatures, plays, poems, and pseudo-scientific, philosophical investigations) were virtually unknown until the 1970s, and not published officially in Russia until the era of glasnost.

Kharms' stories are typically brief vignettes, often only a few paragraphs long, in which scenes of poverty and deprivation alternate with fantastic, dreamlike occurrences and acerbic comedy. Occasionally they incorporate incongruous appearances by famous authors (e.g., Pushkin and Gogol tripping over each other; Count Leo Tolstoy showing his chamber pot to the world; Pushkin and his sons falling off their chairs; etc.).

His manuscripts were preserved by his sister and, most notably, by his friend Yakov Druskin, a notable music theorist and amateur theologist and philosopher, who dragged a suitcase full of Kharms's and Vvedensky's writings out of Kharms's apartment during the blockade of Leningrad and kept it hidden throughout difficult times.

Kharms' adult works were picked up by Russian samizdat starting around the 1960s, and thereby did have an influence on the growing "unofficial" arts scene.

A complete collection of his works was published in Bremen in four volumes, in 1978–1988. In Russia, Kharms' works were widely published only from the late 1980s onward. Now, several editions of Kharms's collected works and selected volumes have been published in Russia, and collections are available in English, French, German, Italian and Finnish. In 2004, a selection of his works appeared in Irish.

Numerous English translations have appeared of late in American literary journals. In the 1970s, George Gibian at Cornell University published the first English collection of OBERIU writing, which included stories and a play by Daniil Kharms and one play by Alexander Vvedensky. Gibian's translations appeared in Annex Press magazine in 1978. In the early 1990s a slim selected volume translated into British English by Neil Cornwell came out in England. New translations of all the members of the OBERIU group (and their closely knit group of friends, the Chinari) appeared in 2006 in the USA (OBERIU: An Anthology of Russian Absurdism). The book contains poetry, drama and prose by Alexander Vvedensky, Daniil Kharms, Nikolai Zabolotsky, Nikolay Oleynikov, Leonid Lipavsky and Yakov Druskin, edited by Eugene Ostashevsky and translated by Matvei Yankelevich, Thomas Epstein, Genya Turovskaya, Eugene Ostashevsky and Ilya Bernstein, with an introduction by Eugene Ostashevsky (not Susan Sontag, who is listed on some websites as the author of the foreword). His short story cycle Incidences (1933–1939) was published in English in 1993. An English translation of a collection of his works, by Matvei Yankelevich, Today I Wrote Nothing, was published in 2007. It includes poems, plays, short prose pieces, and his novella The Old Woman (1939). Another collection in the translation of Alex Cigale, Russian Absurd: Daniil Kharms, Selected Writings, appeared in the Northwestern World Classics series in 2017. A selection of Kharms's dramatic works, A Failed Performance: Short Plays and Scenes, translated by C Dylan Bassett and Emma Winsor Wood, was released by Plays Inverse in 2018. Individual pieces have also been translated by Roman Turovsky.

== Personal life ==
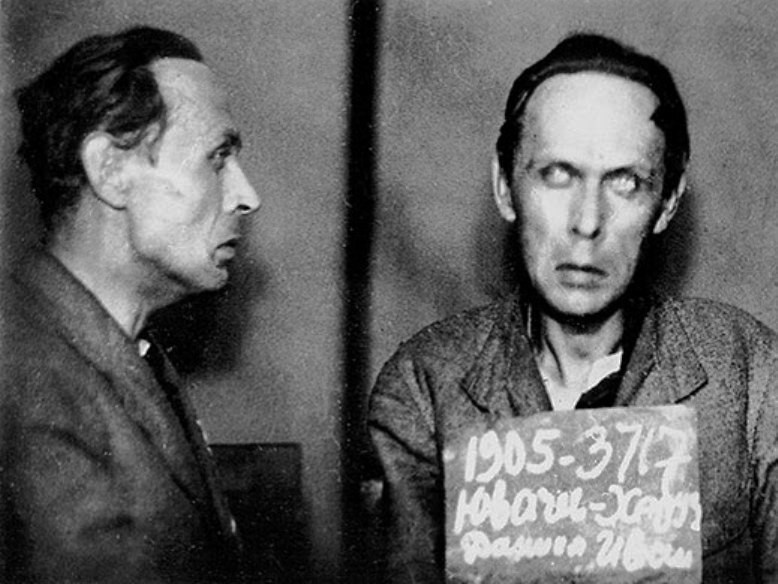
Kharms after his second arrest in 1941

Kharms was married twice, to Esther Rusakova (1909 Marseille, France – 1943 Magadan, Soviet Union), and Marina Malich (1909 St. Petersburg, Russia – 2002 USA). His wives sometimes appear in some of his lyrical or erotic poems.

== Influence ==
- Beginning in the 1970s many of Kharms' children's texts were set to music, and were often played on the radio.
- Ted Milton staged a performance around Kharms' texts, entitled In Kharms Way (with laptop musician Sam Britton).
- The band Esthetic Education composed its poem Juravli I Korabli ("Cranes and Ships"). It appeared on their debut album Face Reading, and on their live album Live at Ring.
- Composer Hafliði Hallgrímsson has composed music featuring Daniil Kharms's writings translated into English.
- The American writer George Saunders has written that he is partly "inspired by a certain absurdist comic tradition," listing Kharms alongside Mark Twain, Groucho Marx, Monty Python, Steve Martin, and Jack Handey.
- In 2003 Dutch musical ensemble De Kift recorded an opera based on the play "Elizaveta Bam" (1927) by Daniil Kharms.
- In 1998 Belgian musician and composer Peter Vermeersch has composed and recorded an album "Charms" based on Daniil Kharms's lyrics, sung in Dutch. The music has been composed for a theatre production by Walpurgis in co-production with the arts centre Vooruit.
- The American rapper billy woods titled his 2015 LP Today I Wrote Nothing. woods' work frequently touches on the same themes as Kharms's, focusing on the absurdity and degradation of poverty.
- British comedic poet Tim Key was heavily influenced by Kharms after studying Russian at university.
- In 2022, the improvisational band The Daniil Kharms recorded Post-Gogol World, a vocal jazz album featuring novel English translations of 8 short texts by Kharms.

== Works ==
- Elizaveta Bam (1927, Елизавета Бам), a play
- Lapa (1930, Лапа), a play
- Incidences (1933–1939, Случаи), a short story cycle
- The Old Woman (1939, Старуха), a novella
- The Plummeting Old Women (1989)
- It Happened Like This: Stories and Poems (1998)
- Today I Wrote Nothing: The Selected Writing of Daniil Kharms (2007)
- A Failed Performance: Short Plays & Scenes by Daniil Kharms (2018)

== Theatre Productions ==
- Comrade K — Teatre del Mar, directed by Joan Carles Bellviure, 2009.
- Harms! Charms! Chardam! — directed by Mikhail Levitin, "Hermitage" Theater, Moscow, 1982, 2008.
- Elizaveta Bam — directed by Fyodor Sukhov, based on the play of the same name by Daniil Kharms. "Theater on the Embankment," 1989, 2009.
- The White Sheep — Moscow "Hermitage" Theater, 2000. Script and direction by Mikhail Levitin.
- The Old Woman — a collaboration between director Robert Wilson and actors Willem Dafoe and Mikhail Baryshnikov. Manchester International Festival, 2013.
- Kharms — a play based on the works of Daniil Kharms, directed by Sergey Filatov. Premiered at the Lensoviet Academic Theater in St. Petersburg, 2015.
- Kharms. Myr — "Gogol Center," directed by Maksim Didenko.
- Daniil Kharms. The SDYGR APPR Story — a monologue by Aleksandr Lushin based on Kharms' works and diaries. Directed by Yuri Vasiliev, "Such Theater" (St. Petersburg).
- Knock! The Daniil Kharms Project — directed by Matthew Woods, BCA Plaza Black Box Theatre, 2014.
- No Pictures Expected — Les Kurbas National Theater Arts Center, directed and adapted by Diana Stein based on Daniil Kharms' novella The Old Woman. Kyiv, 2015.
- One Left Hour: The Life and Work of Daniil Kharms — directed and designed by Nicole Wilson. Randolph Theatre, 2018.
- The Old Woman — directed by Sergey Zhenovach, Maly Drama Theater – Theatre of Europe, 2020.
- Elizaveta Bam — tragic farce, Russian State Theater "Satirikon" named after Arkady Raikin. Directed by Gosha Mnatsakanov, Moscow, 2022.
- Les Charms! — stories by Daniil Kharms, dramaturgy and direction by Marlene Michaelis Breva, 2023.
