= Georgy Sudeykin =

Russian Gendarme colonel

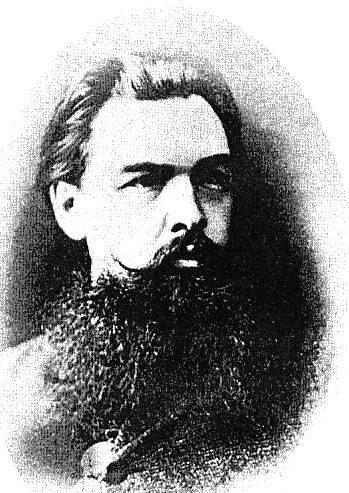
- Born: April 23, 1850; Smolensk Governorate
- Died: December 23, 1883 (aged 33); Saint Petersburg
- Occupation: Political Investigation
- Awards

Georgy Porfiryevich Sudeykin (Russian: Георгий Порфирьевич Судейкин; 11 April 1850 – 16 December 1883 Saint Petersburg) was a Russian Gendarme colonel, the inspector of the Saint Petersburg Department for Protection of Communal Security and Order. He was killed by his own double agent, Sergey Degayev.

Sudeykin was born into a noble family. In the 1870s, after graduating from a Cadet school, he served in the Kiev Gendarme Directorate. In 1879, he was appointed head of the Kyiv police, after his predecessor, Baron Geyking, had been killed by a group who styled themselves the 'Executive Committee of the Socialist Revolutionary party', also known as the Kyiv buntari (rebels), led by a young nobleman, Valerian Osinsky. He successfully broke the group. Osinsky was arrested with two others in January 1879. On 11 February, he and two officers raided a house where six of the buntari, five men and a woman named Natalya Armfeldt were hiding. Two of the surrounded rebels opened fire, killing one of the officers. Sudeykin escaped injury because he was wearing a bullet proof breast plate. The police returned fire, killing two brothers named Ivichevich, and capturing the others. Fourteen of the buntari were tried in May 1879. Three, including Osinsky, were hanged; the others sentenced to 14 years and six months hard labour.

Sudeykin was quickly promoted to the top of the Okhrana hierarchy. In 1881, he became the Head of the Secret Department of Saint Petersburg, responsible for coordination of all secret agents in the capital of the Russian Empire. In 1882, a special position of the Inspector of the Secret Police was created for Sudeykin. There, he supervised all the secret agents of Okhrana.

Sudeykin had managed to recruit one of the Narodnaya Volya leaders, Sergey Degayev, as his agent. According to Degayev, Sudeykin sounded almost like a revolutionary himself, referring to the tsarist regime as rotten and promising that eventually Sudeykin and Degayev would rule Russia, with Degayev helping to wipe out Sudeykin's enemies through the auspices of Narodnaya Volya, and Sudeykin removing all challengers to Degayev's leadership within Narodnaya Volya by employing the assistance of Okhrana. Degayev's information led to arrest of Narodnaya Volya's leader Vera Figner and many other important members of the organization.

Narodnaya Volya eventually exposed Degayev's betrayal. They offered to spare his life if Degayev assassinated Sudeykin. Degayev requested secret meetings with Sudeykin. For unexpected reasons, Sudeykin did not attend the first two of those meetings. Sudeykin came to the third meeting, however, and Degayev killed him by shooting him in the back on 16 December 1883. Degayev, with the help of Narodnaya Volya, managed to escape from Russia to the United States, where he lived under the name of Alexander Pell.

== Awards ==
- Order of Saint Anna 4 degrees
- Cash bonuses
