= Ivan Yuvachev =

Russian writer and former political prisoner

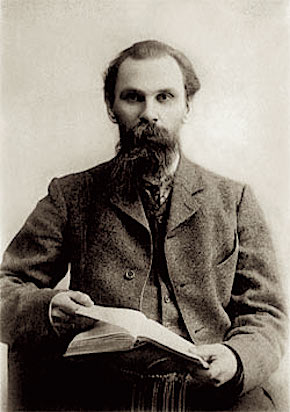
- Ivan Yuvachev after 1900
- Born: Ivan Pavlovich Yuvachev; 1860; St. Petersburg, Russia
- Died: 1940 (aged 79–80); Leningrad, USSR
- Occupation(s): Revolutionary, writer
- Known for: Member of The People's Will
- Children: Daniil Kharms

Ivan Pavlovich Yuvachev (Russian: Иван Павлович Ювачёв) (1860–1940) was a Russian writer and former political prisoner, who was accused of belonging to The People's Will (Narodnaya Volya), the revolutionary organization that assassinated Tsar Alexander II.

== Early life ==
Ivan Yuvachev was born in St Petersburg, where his father worked as a polisher in a palace. After graduating from a school in St Petersburg in 1878, he was trained as an engineer in the Kronstadt naval base, and served as an officer on the Black Sea Fleet. There he became friendly with Mikhail Ashenbrenner, who was recruiting naval officers to Narodnaya Volya. On 2 March 1883, he was arrested, after the police spy, Sergey Degayev had named him as a member of the military wing of Narodnaya Volya, and held in the Peter and Paul Fortress.

Yuvachev was a defendant at the Trial of the Fourteen in October 1884. In court, he denied that he had ever been a member of any revolutionary organisation, and in his memoirs he claimed that he had never met nor had any kind of contact with the main defendant Vera Figner, nor with Aleksandr Butsevich, a lieutenant, a leader of the group to which Yuvachov was accused of belonging. Nonetheless, Yuvachev was found guilty and sentenced to death. His sentence was commuted to fifteen years hard labour.

After the trial, Yuvachev spent four years in solitary confinement in the Schlusselburg Fortress. In this period he experienced a religious awakening, or perhaps a mental breakdown. Vera Figner, who was also a prisoner in the fortress, wrote that:

Shortly after his arrival in Schlusselburg, he lapsed into an abnormal state of religious frenzy. In their attempt to save our souls, the authorities distributed Bibles to all of us, and Yuvachov would kneel for whole days, reading his or praying. On Wednesdays and Fridays the prison administration required a partial fast, but Yuvachev, not satisfied with such half way measures, took no food at all on those days. His religious zeal was, of course, noticed."

Rejecting an offer to be released to a monastery, Yuvachev served eight additional years of hard labor on Sakhalin island, where he was placed in charge of a weather station. Anton Chekhov came to know Yuvachev well in this period, and later wrote about Yuvachev in a text recalling his time on Sakhalin.

After his release in 1895, Yuvachev settled in Vladivostok, then returned to St Petersburg in 1899. In 1901, using the pen name "I.P.Mirolyubov", he published a memoir Eight Years on Sakhalin Island. Yuvachev emerged from prison a vocal pacifist, and he authored two memoirs and several religious-mystical tracts.

Yuvachev is the father of Russian poet Daniil Kharms. A popular account of Kharm's birth has Yuvachev predicting the precise day of his son's birth in advance, and, from a telephone on Leo Tolstoy's estate, ordering his wife to adhere to the date. She gave birth to her son on the date named by Yuvachev.
