= Trial of the Fourteen =

1884 trial in Russia

The Trial of the Fourteen ("Процесс 14-ти" in Russian) was a trial of fourteen members of Narodnaya Volya. It took place on September 24–28 (October 6–10), 1884 in Saint Petersburg's district military court. Vera Figner - the last member of the Executive Committee of Narodnaya Volya to remain in Russia - was the principal defendant. Other members, including Nikolai Rogachev, Mikhail Ashenbrenner, Alexander Shtromberg, N.D.Pokhitonov, A.P.Tikhanovich, Ivan Yuvachev, Lyudmila Volkenstein and others - were also put on trial. They were all accused of taking part in terrorist activities of Narodnaya Volya. Prosecution used a testimony of Sergey Degayev, who had been an agent of the Okhrana. Vera Figner's last words were printed abroad and distributed illegally in Russia.

Two of the members of Narodnaya Volya were sentenced to death (Rogachev and Shtromberg), another five to eternal katorga, a further six to 15 to 20 years of katorga, and one of them to exile to Siberia.
