= Chukokkala =

Unidentified genre literary work by Korney Chukovsky

Chukokkala (Чукоккала) is a unique literary work produced by Russian writer Korney Chukovsky. Its genre is difficult to identify: traditionally described in Russian literary theory as "handwritten almanac", it is an eclectic mixture of autograph book/diary/scrapbook/guestbook/memoir, maintained since 1914 to late 1960s and first published in 1979 supplied with Chukovsky's comments. Over the time Chukokkala collected a large number of autographs, literary and drawing sketches, notes, puzzles, etc., of numerous famous people.

As Chukovsky explained himself, the name is the portmanteau of his name and "Kuokkala," the name of the place where he lived when he started the autograph book.

The preparation of the first, 1979 print edition, was started in 1964 when Chukovsky's granddaunhter Yelena Chukovskaya decided to make a typewritten copy of Chukokkala, which existed only as a single handwritten original. In 1965 the Iskusstvo Publishing House decided to publish the almanac. Chukovsky supplied it with a detailed commentary and archival materials. The preface to the first edition was written by Irakly Andronnikov. However the publication planned for 1965 did not happen for ideological reasons, and when the first edition had eventually been printed, it was heavily censored. The second, 1999 edition was still incomplete. The first complete edition was published in 2006.

There is a minor planet named 3094 Chukokkala.
