= Diana Stein =

Ukrainian theatre director, playwright, scenographer, lyricist, performer

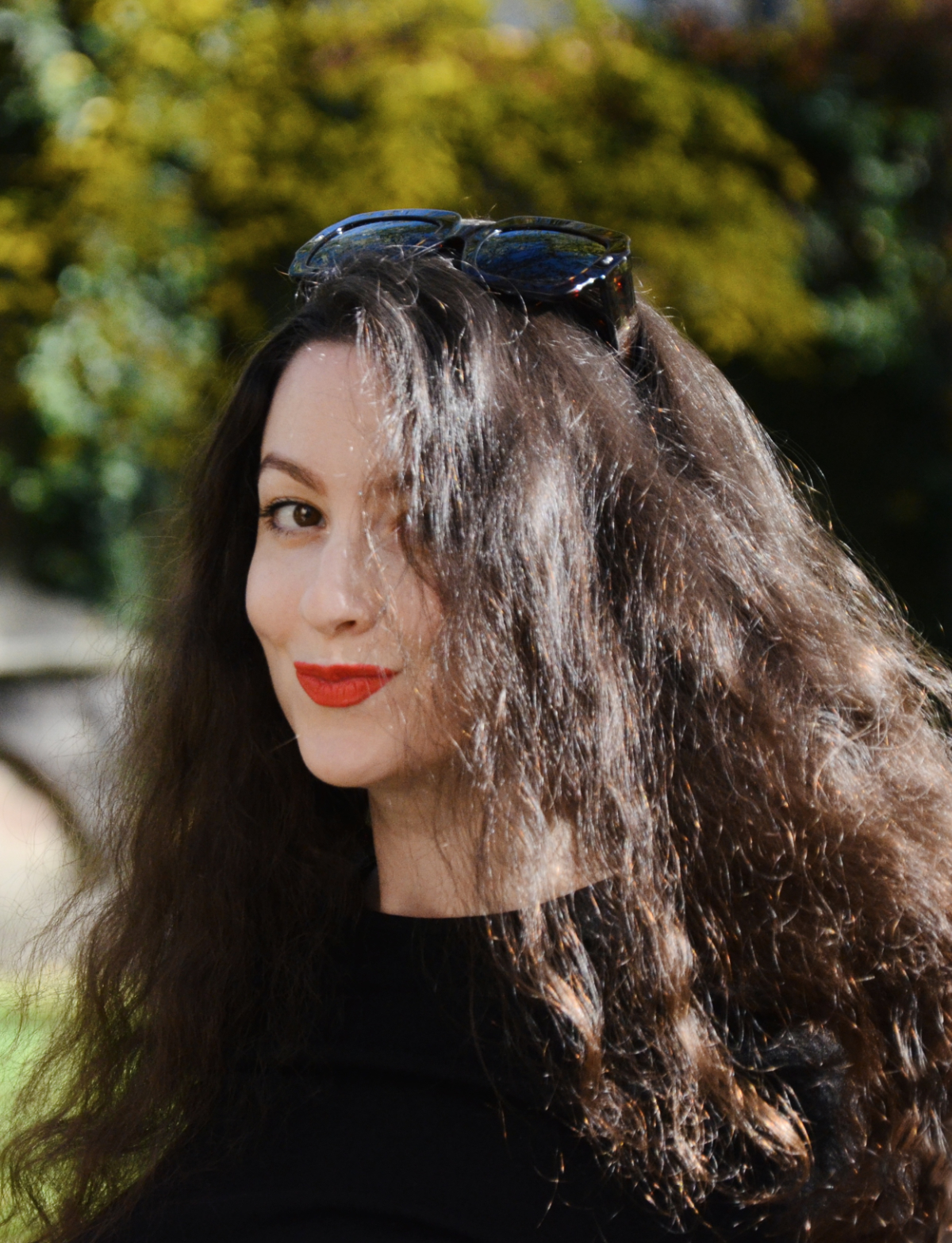
- Stein in 2024
- Education: Oles Honchar Dnipro National University, Kyiv National I. K. Karpenko-Kary Theatre, Cinema and Television University
- Occupations: Theatre director, playwright, scenographer, lyricist, and performer
- Known for: Directing plays at Ivan Franko National Academic Drama Theater, Taras Shevchenko Dnipro National Academic Ukrainian Music and Drama Theatre
- Works: Hedda Gabler, Play, Philip Glass Buys a Loaf of Bread, The Lover, Partners in Crime, Gelsomino in the Land of Liars
- Website: dianastein.com

Diana Stein (also known as Diana Aishe) is a multidisciplinary theatre artist, working as a director, playwright, scenographer, lyricist, and performer. She integrates stage direction, set design, and dramatic writing in her productions. Over the years, she has been involved in experimental theatre and collaborated with major national institutions, including the Ivan Franko National Academic Drama Theatre, the Taras Shevchenko Dnipro National Academic Ukrainian Music and Drama Theatre, and the Les Kurbas National Centre for Theatre Arts. In addition to her theatrical work, Stein is currently developing the Duskhaus project in Germany.

== Early life ==
Diana Stein spent her early years in Ukraine, where she began her engagement with the performing arts. During her youth, she studied in the United States for a year.

Stein obtained a Bachelor's degree in Psychology and English Language and Literature from Oles Honchar Dnipro National University in 2009, followed by a Master’s in Psychology in 2010. She also completed an acting course at the Virymo Theatre. Additionally, she took an acting course at the Virymo Theatre and later pursued theatre directing at the Kyiv National I. K. Karpenko-Kary Theatre, Cinema and Television University, earning her Bachelor's degree in 2014 and Master’s degree in 2015.

During her studies, Stein initiated Aparté Theatre, where she directed experimental performances. She also worked on various visual art projects, collaborating with Ukrainian artists, designers, and photographers, and participated in modelling for artistic photo shoots.

== Theatre Сareer ==
Stein's work spans multiple disciplines, including theatre directing, playwriting, lyric composition, music production, performance, and literary translation. She has worked on independent experimental theatre productions, staged performances in national theatres, and participated in international collaborations.

As the founder of Aparté Theatre, she created original drama texts, adapted literary works, and directed over ten experimental productions. These included Hello, This Is Max Speaking (adapted from Hanoch Levin), Play (Samuel Beckett), The Lover (Harold Pinter), and Experimental World (adapted from short stories by Pär Lagerkvist). Her work during this period was recognised for its experimental staging and conceptual innovation.

Stein later expanded her work to state theatre, joining the ensemble at the Ivan Franko National Academic Drama Theatre. There, she worked as an associate director for productions such as All My Sons (Arthur Miller), Alice’s Travel to Switzerland (Lukas Bärfuss), and Sanation (Václav Havel). At the same time, she worked as a director on independent projects such as pOST bLOCK, a site-specific multimedia performance presented at the Museum of Spiritual Treasures of Ukraine, which explored themes of urban identity.

Notably, Stein staged two versions of No Pictures Expected (adapted from Daniil Kharms’ The Old Woman): the first premiered in 2013 at the Ivan Kozlovsky Art Centre of the National Operetta of Ukraine, and the second in 2015 at the Les Kurbas National Centre for Theatre Arts. Both productions received critical acclaim for their innovative interpretation of absurdist theatre.

At the Taras Shevchenko Dnipro National Academic Ukrainian Music and Drama Theatre, she directed Éric-Emmanuel Schmitt’s Partners in Crime (2014) and Henrik Ibsen’s Hedda Gabler (2015). Partners in Crime earned her the Best Debut award at the Sicheslavna Theatre Festival in 2014. Both productions received positive reviews, as highlighted in press.

At the Ivan Franko National Academic Drama Theatre, she directed a musical play Gelsomino in the Land of Liars (2016–2018), for which she wrote the stage adaptation and lyrics for original songs. Stein also founded the Actor’s Multilingual Performance Lab at the Ivan Franko National Academic Drama Theatre, a research initiative exploring the connections between linguistic adaptability and expressive depth in performance. The program served as the foundation for the development of the English-language production Farewell Cabaret (2020–2021), where Stein contributed as a director, playwright, lyricist, and performer. In this work, she integrated theatrical narrative with music, experimenting with new approaches to actor training and multilingual storytelling.

Her productions, including No Pictures Expected, were showcased at cultural events such as multidisciplinary international festival GOGOLFEST, and received recognition, including a nomination for the Kyiv Pectoral Theatre Award.

In 2022–2023, Stein also contributed to the leadership of the Tel Aviv International Theatre Festival (TAITF), shaping its artistic programming.

Currently based in Germany, Stein continues her artistic practice. She has worked with national theatres, contributed to European cultural organisations, and collaborated with international artists. These experiences have shaped her interdisciplinary approach. She is also working on the Duskhaus project, based in Germany.

== Public Engagement, Global Theatre Work, and Education ==
Stein has been involved in initiatives supporting independent theatre and cultural projects. She has worked with organisations such as the European Theatre Convention (ETC), the International Network for Contemporary Performing Arts (IETM), and the East European Performing Arts Platform (EEPAP). She had a significant role in founding Ukraine's first online theatre platform, which aimed to provide resources and support to artists and theatre institutions. Additionally, she participated in the IETM Satellite Meeting in Kyiv, which helped to strengthen professional connections between Ukrainian and international theatre communities. Her work with the Working Group for Independent Theatres and subsequent roundtable discussions organised by the National Union of Theatre Workers of Ukraine (NUTWU) focused on addressing systemic challenges within the theatre sector.

Internationally, Stein has partnered with institutions that support cross-cultural exchange like the Goethe-Institut and participated in IETM Plenary Meetings and ETC conferences. She was engaged with theatre production at Schauspielhaus Graz, involved on Cactus Land (based on Anthony Loyd’s novel) and Benefiz (by Ingrid Lausund), and at Context Theatre in Israel, where she collaborated on Yosef Bar-Yosef’s The Button.

Stein also integrated theatrical practices into the educational process, creating and leading initiatives such as Foreign Language Through Drama and drama pedagogy seminars, using theatre as a tool for learning. Additionally, she taught other educational programs at Aparté Theatre Studio and served as a lecturer at JCD ETRC (Kyiv), sponsored by the U.S. Embassy. At Aparté Theatre Studio, she conducted the course Contemporary Interpretations of Literary Classics, during which she led discussions and introduced new approaches to classic texts.

== Selected Directed Stage Works ==
- Paper Street (adapted by Diana Stein from M. Tias), 2007.
- Doll Play (Diana Stein), 2008.
- Hello, This Is Max Speaking (adapted by Diana Stein from Hanoch Levin), 2008.
- Play (Samuel Beckett), 2008.
- Anomia (Diana Stein), 2009.
- Music of Spring Performance (Diana Stein), 2009.
- Witches' Loaves (adapted by Diana Stein from O. Henry), 2010.
- Philip Glass Buys a Loaf of Bread (David Ives), 2010.
- Experimental World (adapted by Diana Stein from Pär Lagerkvist), 2010.
- The Victory, 2011 (Diana Stein).
- Outer Life (Diana Stein), 2011.
- The Lover (Harold Pinter), 2012.
- No Pictures Expected (adapted by Diana Stein from Daniil Kharms’ The Old Woman), 2013.
- pOST bLOCK (Diana Stein), 2014.
- Partners in Crime (Éric-Emmanuel Schmitt), 2014.
- No Pictures Expected (adapted by Diana Stein from Daniil Kharms’ The Old Woman), 2015.
- Hedda Gabler (Henrik Ibsen), 2015.
- Talk to Me Like the Rain and Let Me Listen (Tennessee Williams), 2016.
- Gelsomino in the Land of Liars (adapted from Gianni Rodari, lyrics and play by Diana Stein), 2016–2018.
- Farewell Cabaret (Diana Stein), 2020–2021.

== Translations ==
- A Midsummer Night's Dream by William Shakespeare
- Selected Sonnets by William Shakespeare
- Benjamin Franklin: An American Life by Walter Isaacson, translated by Diana Stein and Vladimir Kuzin (2013, ISBN 978-5-91657-672-6)
- Swim Smooth: The Complete Coaching System for Swimmers and Triathletes by Paul Newsome and Adam Young, 2013 (ISBN 978-5-91657-653-5)
