= Elephter Andronikashvili =

Georgian physicist

- ელეფთერ ანდრონიკაშვილი
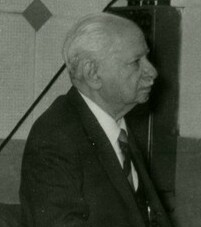
- Elephter Andronikashvili, 1986
- Born: 25 December 1910 [O.S. 12 December 1910] Saint Petersburg, Russian Empire
- Died: September 9, 1989 (aged 78); Tbilisi, Georgian SSR
- Education: Institute for Physical Problems
- Relatives: Irakly Andronikov
- Awards: Stalin Prize (1952); USSR State Prize (1978)
- Scientific career
- Fields: Quantum hydrodynamics
- Workplaces: Georgian Academy of Sciences
- Doctoral students: Physicist

Elephter Luarsabovich Andronikashvili (the first name sometimes spelled Elevter or Elefter, Georgian: ელეფთერ ანდრონიკაშვილი, Russian: Элевтер Луарсабович Андроникашвили; 25 December [O.S. 12 December] 1910 – 9 September 1989) was a Georgian physicist. He was a brother of Russian historian Irakly Andronikov.

== Biography ==
Elephter Andronikashvili came from the noble Georgian Andronikashvili family. He graduated from Leningrad Polytechnical Institute in 1932. From 1934 to 1945 he lectured at Tbilisi State University. Starting in 1942 he worked for the Georgian Academy of Sciences Institute of Physics, and in 1951 he became the director of the Institute. In 1940–1941 and 1945–1948 he also did his Doktor Nauk degree at the Institute for Physical Problems in Moscow. From 1951 he also worked as a head of a department and a Professor of Tbilisi State University.

Andronikashvili received Stalin Prize in 1952 for his works on superfluidity and USSR State Prize in 1978. Andronikashvili was a full member of the Georgian Academy of Sciences (since 1955). In 1999, the Elephter Andronikashvili Institute of Physics was named after him.

== Contributions to physics ==
Andronikashvili conducted early experiments on superfluid helium II, including the classic experiment in 1946, suggested by the Russian theorist Lev Landau, studying the period and damping of torsional oscillations of stacked closely spaced rotating disks. This provided key evidence to help establish the two fluid model of superfluidity.

The damping of the disks was much the same in helium II (which is a superfluid) as that experienced in helium I (fluid helium above the temperature for transition to the superfluid phase). However, the period of the pendulum was found to be temperature dependent below the transition temperature, tending toward the period in vacuo at the lowest temperatures (those approaching absolute zero). Since the period depends on the inertia of the liquid which is dragged along with the disks, it seemed that a decreasing fraction of the liquid is dragged along as the temperature is reduced.

Andronikshvili also worked together with Tsakadze in 1960 to extend work by Hall in Manchester on vortex waves in helium II, comparing the results with those obtained with classical fluids such as water and helium I to verify that the results obtained by Hall were not classical in nature. A review of this work appears in the chapter written for the 1967 Progress in Low Temperature Physics together with Mamaladze.

== Publications ==
- Andronikashvili, E.L. and Mamaladze, Y.G. 1967 Rotation of helium II in Progress in Low Temperature Physics V (C.J. Gorter, ed.) North-Holland, Amsterdam, Chapter 3, pp. 79–160.
- Andronikashvili, E.L. and Mamaladze, Yu G. 1966 Quantization of macroscopic motions and hydrodynamics of rotating helium II Rev. Mod. Phys. 38, 567-625.
- Andronikashvili, E.L. and Tsakadze, D.S. 1960 The propagation of oscillations along vortex lines in rotating helium II Sov. Phys. JETP 10, 227-8.
- Andronikashvili, E.L. Reflections of liquid Helium (Russian) Trans. & pubd. by American Institute of Physics, 1980
