= Irakly Andronikov =

Russian literary historian (1908–1990)

- Ираклий Андроников
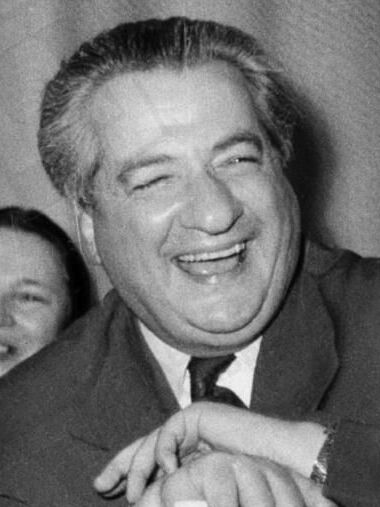
- On 1955
- Born: Irakli Luarsabis dze Andronikashvili; September 28, 1908; Saint Petersburg, Russian Empire
- Died: June 11, 1990 (aged 81); Moscow, Russia
- Occupations: Literature historian, philologist, spoken word artist, media personality
- Awards: People's Artist of the USSR (1982)

Irakly Luarsabovich Andronikov (Note: Russian: Ира́клий Луарса́бович Андро́ников, romanized: Irakly Luarsabovich Andronikov, sometimes given as Andronnikov) (28 September [O.S. 15 September] 1908 – 11 June 1990, born Irakli Luarsabis dze Andronikashvili) (Note: Georgian: ირაკლი ლუარსაბის ძე ანდრონიკაშვილი, romanized: Irak’li Luarsabis dze Andronik’ashvili) was a Russian writer and literature historian of noble Georgian origin, best known for his studies of Mikhail Lermontov.

== Biography ==
Irakly Andronikov came from a Georgian noble family of Andronikashvili (Andronikov) and was born in Saint Petersburg. His father Luarsab Nikolaevich Andronikov was a lawyer whom the Russian Provisional Government appointed Senate Criminal Department Secretary in 1917. Irakly's mother Yekaterina Gurevich came from an artistic Gurevich-Ilyin family. Irakly's maternal grandfather Yakov Gurevich was the founder of Bestuzhev Courses, the first Russian tertiary school for women. Irakly's grandmother Lyubov Gurevich (née Ilyina) was a daughter of architect Ivan Ivanovich Ilyin (one of the builders of the Grand Kremlin Palace) and an aunt of philosopher Ivan Ilyin. His aunt Liubov Gurevich and uncle Yakov Yakovlevich Gurevich were notable writers and magazine editors. Irakly's younger brother Elephter Andronikashvili was a notable physicist.

In 1918 Luarsab was invited to teach philosophy at Tula State Pedagogical Institute in Tula, Russia. In 1921 the family briefly moved to Moscow and then settled in Tbilisi. In 1925 Irakly graduated from a secondary school in Tbilisi and entered the Faculty of History and Philology at Leningrad State University and the philological department of the Art History Institute. He studied history and philology under Boris Eikhenbaum, Viktor Zhirmunsky, Lev Shcherba and Yevgeny Tarle. In 1928 he became interested in music and worked as a lecturer for the Leningrad Philharmonic.

In 1930 Andronikov graduated from Leningrad State University and started to work for children magazines Chizh and Yozh. From 1934 he worked as a bibliographer for the Leningrad Public Library. He started to study biography and the works of Russian poet Mikhail Lermontov at the university and continued his study while working in the library. He published his first article about Lermontov in 1936 and in 1939 he published his book Lermontov Life. The same year he was admitted to the Union of Soviet Writers.

In 1942 Andronikov worked as a correspondent of an Army newspaper on Kalinin Front.

In 1946 he obtained his Candidate of Sciences degree for a thesis about Mikhail Lermontov. He continued to publish books about Lermontov «Рассказы литературоведа» (1949), «Лермонтов» (1951), «Лермонтов. Исследования, статьи, рассказы» (1952), «Лермонтов в Грузии в 1837 году» (1955). The last book, Lermontov in Georgia in 1837, was considered sufficient to give him the Doctor of Sciences degree of Moscow State University (1956). He continued his Lermontov study and in 1967 he received the USSR State Prize for his book «Лермонтов. Исследования и находки» (Lermontov. Research and Findings) published in 1964. Andronikov also was awarded Lenin Prize (1976) for his contributions to Russian culture.

Andronikov started to perform public lectures in a writers club in 1935 and soon became enormously popular. In 1954 he started to perform on television (show Andronikov Tells (Андроников Рассказывает). In a number of documentaries there, he tells his stories: «Загадка Н. Ф. И.», «Страницы большого искусства», «Портреты неизвестных», «Слово Андроникова» were published.

He died in Moscow in 1990.
