= Konstantin Vaginov =

Russian poet

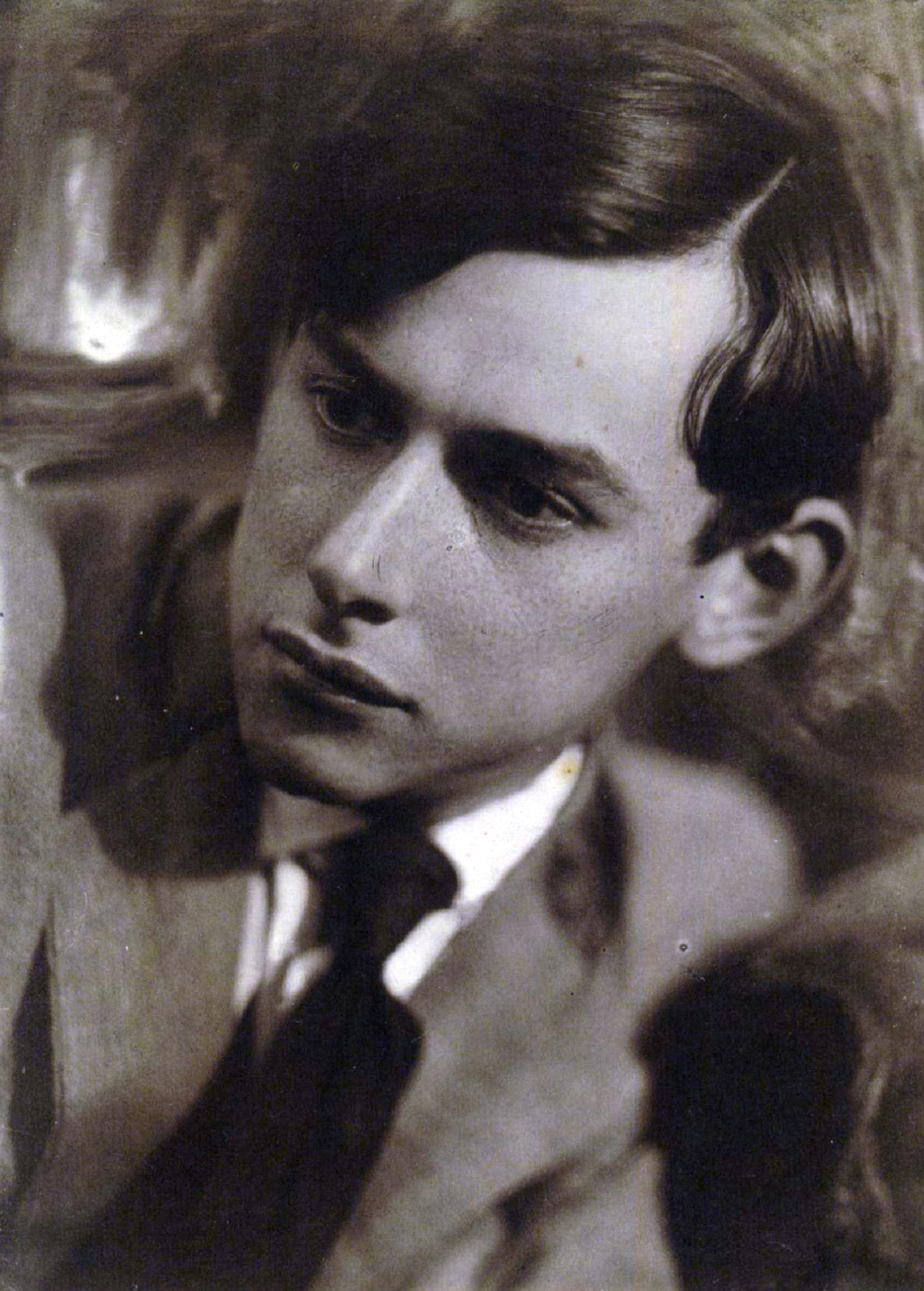
- Vaginov c. 1920
- Born: Konstantin Konstantinovich Vaginov; 3 October [O.S. 21 September] 1899; Saint Petersburg, Russian Empire
- Died: 26 April 1934 (aged 34); Leningrad, Russian SFSR, Soviet Union
- Citizenship: Russian Empire (1899–1917); Soviet Russia (1917–1922); Soviet Union (1922–1934)
- Occupations: Poet, writer
- Writing career
- Notable works: Goat Song; Works and Days of Svistonov

Konstantin Konstantinovich Vaginov (Russian: Константи́н Константи́нович Ва́гинов, born Konstantin Wagenheim, 3 October [O.S. 21 September] 1899 – April 26, 1934) was a Russian poet and novelist.

== Biography ==
Vaginov's mother was Russian; his father's grandfather was a Jew with surname Wagenheim (Russian: Вагенгейм); Vaginov's paternal grandfather converted to Lutheran faith, and his father converted to Russian Orthodox faith. During the First World War, the family name was Russified to Vaginov.

Following his father's wishes, Vaginov studied law. During the Civil War, Vaginov served in the Red Army, both at the Polish front and east of the Urals. He returned to Petrograd and, after being demobilized, continued studies in the arts and humanities. In 1926 he married Alexandra Ivanovna Fedorova. She and Vaginov were both part of a group of writers who gathered about the poet, world traveler and decorated war hero Nikolai Gumilyov, who was shot in 1921, after being wrongly accused of plotting against the government.

Konstantin Vaginov died of tuberculosis in 1934, in Leningrad.

== Work ==
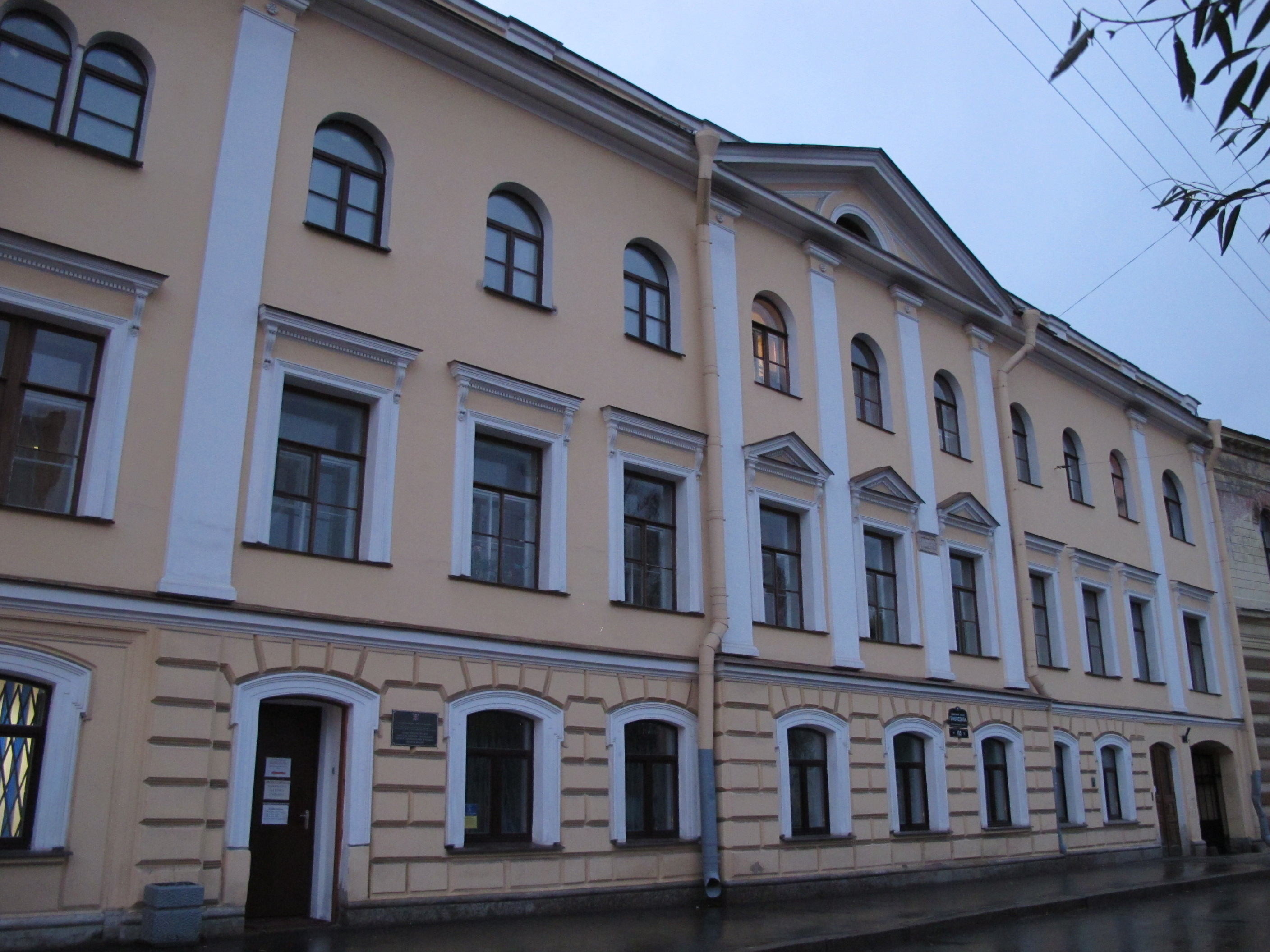
Griboedov Canal Embankment, No. 105. Vaginov lived here in 1920—1934.

Vaginov wrote his earliest poetry when he was a teenager, and his first collection, Journey to Chaos, was published in 1921. Other collections were published in 1926 and 1931. His first prose works, "The Monastery of Our Lord Apollo" and "The Star of Bethlehem," were published in 1922. Vaginov's first novel, Kozlinaya Pesn' (literally "Goat Song," but also translated into English as "[The Tower]" and "Satyr Chorus," was written between 1925 and 1927. The novel is based on the intellectual circle grouped around the philosopher and literary theorist Mikhail Bakhtin. Vaginov completed two other novels, Works and Days of Svistonov (1929) and Bambocciada (1931). As Vaginov's health declined, he worked on a fourth novel, Harpagoniana, which was left incomplete. Shortly before his death, he started work on a novel about the 1905 revolution. The materials for that work were confiscated by the authorities.

Through the mid-1920s, Vaginov mainly wrote poetry that might be described as post-Symbolist and Acmeist. With its overlapping allusions to contemporary upheavals, along with historical and mythological references, the poetry is at times almost hermetic. His turn to the novel marks a turning point. And Kozlinaya Pesn might be thought of as a transitional work, with its fragments of poetry and scattered commentary on the generation of poetry and its degeneration. The book also marks the author's most transparent examination of the role of literature and criticism in society.

During the 1920s, Vaginov had some contact with most of the major literary circles in Petrograd/Leningrad. In 1927, he became affiliated with a left avant-garde collective of writers known as OBERIU, sometimes described as "Absurdist" and chiefly known through the work of Daniil Kharms. Around this time, Vaginov's turn to prose was marked by a drift toward a preoccupation with Surrealism—the throwaway mythology of everyday life. A man who devoured literature in multiple languages from various centuries, Vaginov was an avid collector of books, many of them salvaged from ransacked libraries and peddled secondhand on the street. But he was also a collector of anything from old coins to candy wrappers and cigarette packs. While some of his characters collected things having at least an association with high culture, Vaginov explored the intersection between the mutability of matter and minds haunted by monuments, even those in ruins. Solomon Volkov writes:

He likened the victory of the Russian Revolution, which ruined his family, to the triumph of the barbaric tribes over the Roman Empire. For Vaginov, Petersburg had been a magical stage for that cultural tragedy, and he sang the praises of the spectral city in dadaist poems (which also showed the influence of Mandelstam), in which "pale blue sails of dead ships" appeared tellingly. Mandelstam, in turn, rated Vaginov highly, including him as a poet "not for today but forever" in a list with Akhmatova, Pasternak, Gumilyov, and Khodasevich.
