= Elephter Andronikashvili Institute of Physics =

Institute of Physics in Georgia

- Established: 1950; 76 years ago
- Staff: 189
- Address: Tbilisi, Tamarashvili St. 6
- Location: Tbilisi, Georgia
- Coordinates: 41.7207°N 44.7448°E
- Interactive map of Elephter Andronikashvili Institute of Physics
- Website: www.aiphysics.tsu.ge

Elephter Andronikashvili Institute of Physics (Georgian: ელეფთერ ანდრონიკაშვილის სახელობის ფიზიკის ინსტიტუტი) is a Institute of Science based on Tbilisi State University.

== History ==
This Institute of Physics was established in December 1950 and was a part of the Georgian National Academy of Sciences until 2006. The idea of establishing the institute belonged to Academician Elephter Andronikashvili. The institute was named after him in 1999.

Elephter Andronikashvili and Giorgi Kharadze were the academicians who headed the Institute at different times.

== Scientific research ==
Jumber Lominadze, Nodar Tsintsadze, Elephter Andronikashvili, Albert Tavkhelidze, and Devi Garibashvili

The Institute of Physics managed to acquire modern scientific potential through the efforts of Professor Elephter Andronikashvili. Elephter Andronikashvili headed the institute for almost 40 years and gained international recognition thanks to fundamental experiments in the study of the liquid helium and its properties.

The institute has received more than 90 international, more than 100 local and more than 50 individual grants Since 1992.

The Institute of Physics operated a nuclear reactor from 1959 to 1990, and from 1959 to 1986 a high-altitude laboratory for studying cosmic rays on the Tskhratskaro Pass.

The first international conference was held at the Institute in 1955, since then the Institute of Physics has been participating in various international events. The Institute of Physics publishes an average of 125 papers of scientific work annually. The Institute successfully cooperates with leading universities and research centers in Brazil, Czech Republic, Latvia, Japan, Ukraine.

Scientists at the institute are involved in international projects such as the ATLAS experiment on the Large Hadron Collider (LHC) of the European Organization for Nuclear Research (CERN – Switzerland, Geneva). The institute is also actively collaborating with the Joint Institute for Nuclear Research (Dubna) and the Helsinki University of Technology (Finland).

Based on local and international grants, the institute's scientists also work in the field of applied research. For example, on some important issues such as reduction of harmful vehicle emissions, toxic emissions using combined nanotechnology methods, processing of radiation-resistant ceramics for friction nodes operating in extreme conditions (sample design and testing), etc.

== 1951-1988 ==
In 1951-1988, the director of the Institute of Physics of the Georgian National Academy of Sciences was Elephter Andronikashvili.

It was during this period that Andronikashvili and his students were the first to study the transverse impulses of the products of interaction caused by cosmic ray particles, which enabled them to question the possibility of the internal structure of elementary particles. These fundamental results have also been included in several encyclopedic and monographic publications.

Vika Siradze and Elephter Andronikashvili in the Institute of Physics

Under the leadership of Elephter Andronikashvili, the world's first indium-gallium radiation circuit – a powerful source of gamma rays was created at the reactor of the Institute of Physics. Institute played a leading role in Soviet Union's development of a new direction of studies – low-temperature radiation material science.

In 1969, the Institute of Physics was awarded the Order of the Red Banner of Labor for its achievements in the field of cosmic ray physics and for the training of highly qualified scientific staff. Prominent scientists such as Mstislav Keldysh and Niels Bohr. have visited to the Institute of Physics.

== 1988-2006 ==
In 1988-2006, Academician Giorgi Kharadze was the director of the Elephter Andronikashvili Institute of Physics.

== Nuclear reactor ==
With the initiative of the director of the Institute of Physics, Academician Elephter Andronikashvili, the construction of a research nuclear reactor near the village of Mukhatgverdi near Tbilisi began in 1957, and on November 21, 1959 it was opened officially. Since then, the reactor has been reconstructed several times to strengthen its capacity.

Nils Bohr and Elephter Andronikashvili

In 1990, Georgian National Academy of Sciences made a decision to stop working on the nuclear reactor due to the negative attitude of a certain part of the Georgian society and nuclear fuel was removed from the reactor's active zone.

== The structure of the institute ==
The Elephter Andronikashvili Institute of Physics has 189 employees, of which 104 are scientists. The institute has five scientific departments, library and a mechanical workshop.

=== Building ===
The building of Elephter Andronikashvili Institute of Physics originally located on Lado Gudiashvili Square in Tbilisi, but later a special building was built for the Institute on Tamarashvili Street.

== Scientific collaboration ==
Since 1985, there has been an active cooperation between the Elephter Andronikashvili Institute of Physics of TSU and the Institute of Plasma Physics of the Czech Academy of Sciences (Tokamak Plasma Physics), which is updated every 5 years.

== Scientific direction ==
The goal of the Elephter Andronikashvili Institute of Physics is to conduct scientific research in the main areas of theoretical, experimental and applied physics:

- Elementary particle physics;
- Condensed environmental physics;
- Plasma physics;
- Physics of biological systems;
- Applied Physics.

== Modern situation ==
Currently, the Elephter Andronikashvili Institute of Physics is part of the Ivane Javakhishvili Tbilisi State University as an independent scientific-research institute. From 2006 to present day, Gela Gelashvili, Doctor of Physics and Mathematics, works as a Director of the Elephter Andronikashvili Institute of Physics.

== Bibliography ==
- Iskhneli, V. (1980). "About Physicists".
- "Georgian Soviet Encyclopedia". (1975) (Ch.1, p. 449). Tbilisi.
- Encyclopedia "Tbilisi". (2002) (p. 870). Tbilisi.
