= Artur Khominsky =

Artur Sigizmundovich Khominsky (in Polish: Artur Franciszek Julian Chomiński, January 5 [17 N. S.], 1888 – after May 1917?) was a Russian-language poet and prose writer. His work, teetering on the edge of epigonic Russian Symbolism and surrealist absurdity, went unnoticed by his contemporaries and was rediscovered in the 21st century.

Artur Khominsky came from Polish-speaking Catholics belonging to the Lis coat of arms; his ancestors’ estates were located in what is now Lithuania and Belarus. His grandfather, Stanislaw Chomiński (1807–1886), was a general in Russian service and governor of Kovno (Kaunas) and later Vologda Governorate; his uncle and cousin were active in Polish politics. Artur Khominsky was born in Dobrovliany (now in the Hrodna region of Belarus) and lost his mother when he was only a month old. He lived since his school days in Kiev (Kyiv), occasionally traveling to other places in Central Ukraine. He broke away early from his wealthy family and earned his living independently. Little is known about his life.

Between 1908 and 1916, he published several books of poetry and one long novella — Jenkini’s Comfort (Ujut Dzhenkini) — in Kyiv and Zvenyhorodka. The novella is set in the same fantastical, surrealist world that appears in his final poetic publication, Beloved to a Dog: A Strong Poem.

Khominsky considered himself a devotee of the paramount Russian symbolist Alexander Blok, although his attempt to meet Blok personally was unsuccessful. After 1914, Khominsky associated with Kyiv student poets (mostly writing in Russian, with the only exception of the future well-known Ukrainian poet Maksym Rylsky), who had organized a group called the Kyiv Anthropophagi. However, he did not feel fully aligned with their views due to age (and literary generation) difference. He mentions that, at some point, he served at the front during World War I.

His letters from 1916 onward show growing signs of drug addiction, depression, and precarious living; his last dated letter is from May 3, 1917, and there is reason to believe he did not live much longer after that.

Khominsky’s work, ignored in his lifetime, drew attention after a 2013 publication. Critics noted his ahead-of-its-time absurdism and the way his poetry and prose anticipated techniques later used by the OBERIU group. The action of Khominsky’s works takes place in an aestheticized, parodic world filled with stylized characters (a millionaire beauty, a sinister dog), which sharply contrast with the prosaic or nonsensical details that interrupt the narrative. Scholars writing about Khominsky observed that these techniques may well have been unintentional — his genius borders on graphomania or “naïve writing,” which in itself makes him an intriguing figure.
