= Natalya Armfeldt =

Russian revolutionary (1850–1887)

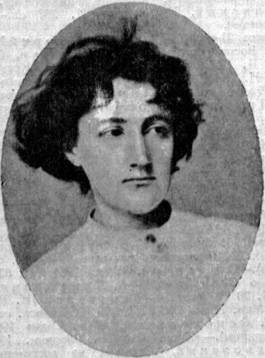
Natalya Armfeldt ca. 1880

Natalya Alexandrovna Armfeldt (Russian: Наталья Алексаӊдровӊа Армѳельдт; 1850–1887) was one of the first Russian revolutionaries to resort to political violence in opposition to the Tsar's regime. She was sentenced to hard labour and deported to Siberia, where she contracted tuberculosis.

== Biography ==
=== Family ===
Natalya Armfeldt's father was Professor Alexander Armfeldt (1839–1897), one of Russia's leading specialists in cattle breeding. He arranged for her to study mathematics at Heidelberg University.

=== Political ===
Natalya Armfeldt abandoned her studies in 1874, to join the movement among idealistic Russian students and graduates to leave the cities and 'go to the people' to learn about and try to improve the lives of the peasants. She joined an illegal socialist group in Moscow, and set out to a village in Orel province, but was arrested and deported back to Moscow. In 1875, she was exiled by administrative order to Kostroma. When her term of exile ended, in 1877, she settled illegally in Ukraine, and joined the Kiev buntari, or 'Southern Rebels'. She was present at a political meeting on 11 February 1879, which was raided by the police. Some of the men opened fire. One gendarme two of the rebels, Ivan Ivichevich and his brother, were fatally wounded. Armfeldt and three others were arrested. She was tried, with 13 other buntari and sentenced to 14 years and ten months hard labour.

=== Exile ===
Natalya Armfeldt was deported to the Kara katorga in eastern Siberia, close to the Chinese border, where she was among dozens of political prisoners forced to work in privately owned mines, in harsh conditions. She fell ill with tuberculosis. In 1883, she and two other prisoners were offered pardons if they would renounce their views and admit their 'errors'. She refused the offer. In 1884, her mother, Anna Armfeldt appealed for help from Leo Tolstoy (the author of War and Peace) to get permission to settle in Kara to look after her daughter. Tolstoy wrote to his aunt, Alexandrine, who was well connected at the court of the Tsar Alexander III, asking her to take up the case. In 1885, Natalya was released from work in the mines, but confined to political exile in the Kara district, where her mother was permitted to join her.

In November 1885, the American explorer George Kennan visited Kara, bringing a letter of introduction to Armfeldt from a Russian who knew the family and had told him where the two women were living. He gave the authorities the slip and arrived unannounced at their "little whitewashed cabin". He noted that "Miss Armfeldt spoke French, German and English, drew, painted and was an educated and accomplished woman." Her mother was "a worn, broken woman...with soft grey hair and a face refined, gentle, intelligent but deeply lined by care and grief." Natalya asked Kennan to return that evening, by which time she had assembled a group of political exiles including Maria Kolenkina, who shared their stories with Kennan. This meeting inspired Kennan's classic study, Siberia and the Exile System, which first alerted opinion abroad to the ill-treatment of Russia's political prisoners. But when Kennan met Leo Tolstoy and described the conditions under which Armfeldt and other exiles were living, the novelist showed little sympathy, complaining that the revolutionaries had resorted to violence.

She died of tuberculosis in exile in 1887. Her mother died soon afterwards.
