= International Network for Contemporary Performing Arts (IETM) =

International network for contemporary performing arts

IETM-International Network for Contemporary Performing Arts
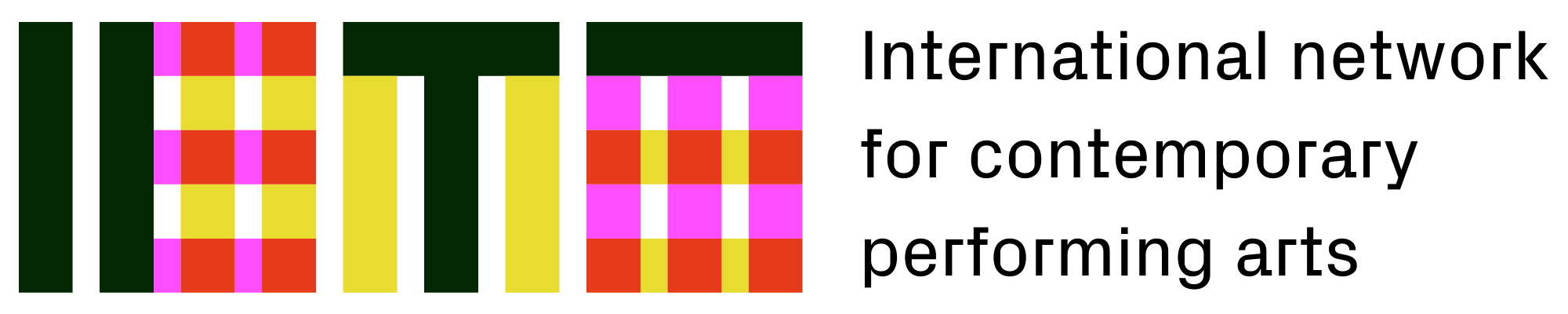
- Founded: 1981; 45 years ago
- Founded at: Polverigi, Italy
- Type: Cultural institution
- Location: Brussels, Belgium
- Region served: Worldwide
- Members: 530+
- Secretary General: Ása Richardsdóttir
- Key people: Jeffrey Meulman | Susanne Næss Nielsen | Margherita Petti
- Website: https://www.ietm.org/

IETM, fully International network for contemporary performing arts is a cultural network for performing arts organizations and individual members working in the contemporary performing arts worldwide. Established in 1981 in Polverigi, Italy, during the Festival of Polverigi (now called Inteatro festival), the network had its first meeting on 15 October 1981, at the Théâtre Gérard Philippe, Paris.

IETM host peer-to-peer learning, exchanges and dialogues at events, commissions publications and research, and provides network for performing arts professionals on her website. IETM hold two plenary meetings a year in different European cities and smaller meetings all over the world.

== Membership ==
IETM is a membership based network focusing on contemporary performing arts. Since its formation, the network have over 530 members in more than 60 countries worldwide, this include festivals, companies, producers, theaters, research and resource centers, Independent artist, Artist Collective, universities and institutional bodies. Membership fee of the network is based on annual turnover of your member organization’s or members freelance activities

== Projects and Activities ==
IETM is frequently involved in various European and international projects, functioning as an organizer and as a collaborator. Objectives of these projects ranges from creating new knowledge, explore relevant topics, and to address the needs of both its members and the sector in general.

- Perform Europe is an EU-funded project that aims to rethink cross-border performing arts in a more inclusive, sustainable and balanced way, across the 40 Creative Europe countries and the UK. The aim of Perform Europe is to collectively test and design a future European support scheme for cross-border touring and digital distribution of the performing arts.Over 18 months, Perform Europe will explore and test sustainable touring practices – on artistic, human, social, economic and ecological levels.
- Local Journeys for Change is a training program for members of the foundation that seeks to foster positive change in the local professional context, in communities or in the field of policy making. Through training, mentoring, exchange of ideas with the IETM network and financial support, up to 25 members per year will receive support to carry out a small project in their places of origin that helps them address the most relevant problems in their local reality.
- Plenary Meeting is a themed migratory meetings of the Networks members an insight into what is special about the contemporary performing arts sector across. The event is a collaborative session with a host performing art center in the selected host city, it is free of charge for the first representative of a member organization. Beyond the first delegate, each additional participant from the same organization will pay a registration. For non member it is a paid event. IETM plenary meetings program of talks, peer-to-peer learning, walks, and performances from local and national companies and artists, networking opportunities and more.
- IETM Caravan is a migratory artistic field trip for members of the network and non-members. IETM caravan features theater performances from local (in host city) and international artist, panel discussions, networking sessions, and visits to key cultural venues. The Caravan also host space for connecting with local artists and cultural workers from the local performing arts scene.
