= Mikhail Ashenbrenner =

Russian revolutionary

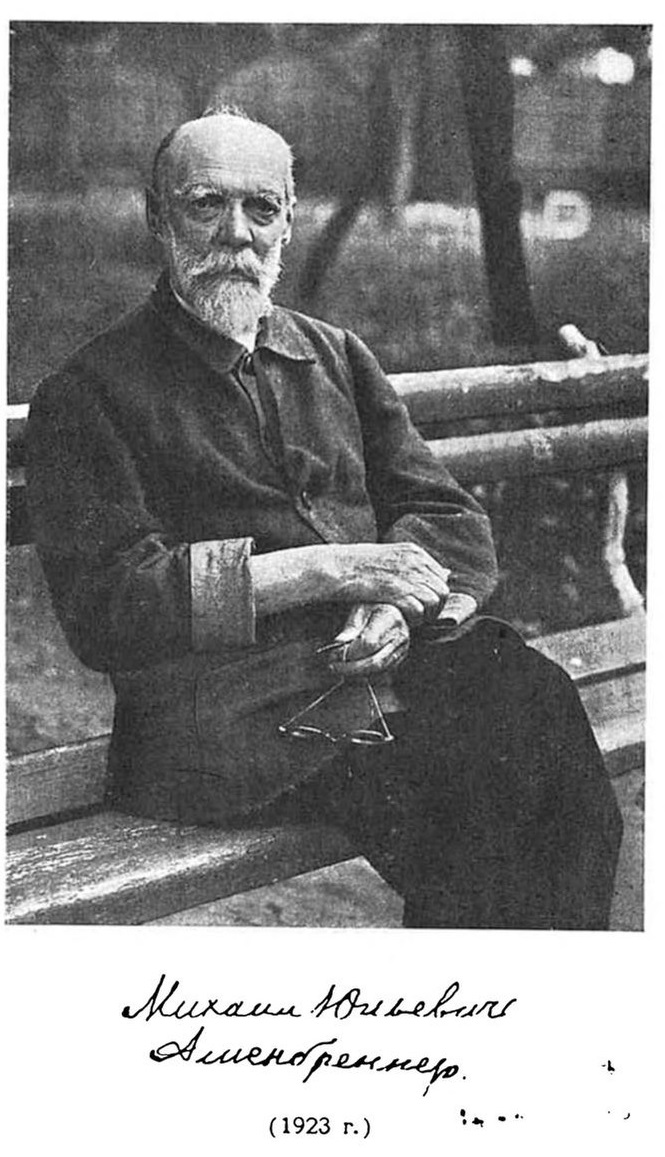
Mikhail Ashenbrenner

Mikhail Yulevich Ashenbrenner (Russian: Михаил Юльевич Ашенбреннер) (September 21 [O.S. September 9], 1842 – November 11, 1926) was a Russian revolutionary, and one of the leaders of the Military Organisation of the Narodnaya Volya (People's Will), the group that carried out the assassination of the Tsar Alexander II.

== Biography ==
Mikhail Ashenbrenner was born in Moscow into the gentry. His father was a russified German, who worked as a military engineer, his mother was the daughter of General Mikhail Naumov, a veteran of the 1812 war against the French. He studied with the First Moscow Cadet Corps, and was discharged in 1860, with the rank of lieutenant. As an officer, he and a group of comrades studied the natural sciences, and studied Feuerbach, Darwin, and Spencer. In 1864, he was deported to Turkestan for refusing to take part in suppressing the Polish Uprising against Russian rule. He lived in a remote part of Bessarabia until the outbreak of the Russo-Turkish War in 1877, and then in Kherson province.

From 1880, all his energy was devoted to organising revolutionary groups in the military. His work was assisted by the respect that officers had for him. In 1882, the central military circle in St Petersburg urged local circles to get actively involved in Narodnaya Volya. Ashenbrenner was delegated to go round the military circles across Russia, enlist correspondents for a military-revolutionary journal and recruit delegates for a congress of local groups, but while he was doing so, the military wing of Narodnaya Volya was eliminated by mass arrests, after being betrayed by the police informer, Sergey Degayev.

Ashenbrenner was arrested in March 1883, and was a defendant at the Trial of the 14, alongside Vera Figner and others, in September 1884. He was sentenced to death, but the sentence was commuted to life imprisonment. He spent 20 years in the Shlisselburg Fortress, until his release on 20 September 1904. He then lived under police supervision in Smolensk. After the Bolshevik Revolution, he was allocated a place in Ilych Home for Revolutionary Veterans. His memoirs were published in the journal Byloe in 1906, and reissued as a separate publication with the title The Military Organisation of People's Will in 1942.
