= Les Kurbas National Centre for Theatre Arts =

- Національний центр театрального мистецтва імені Леся Курбаса
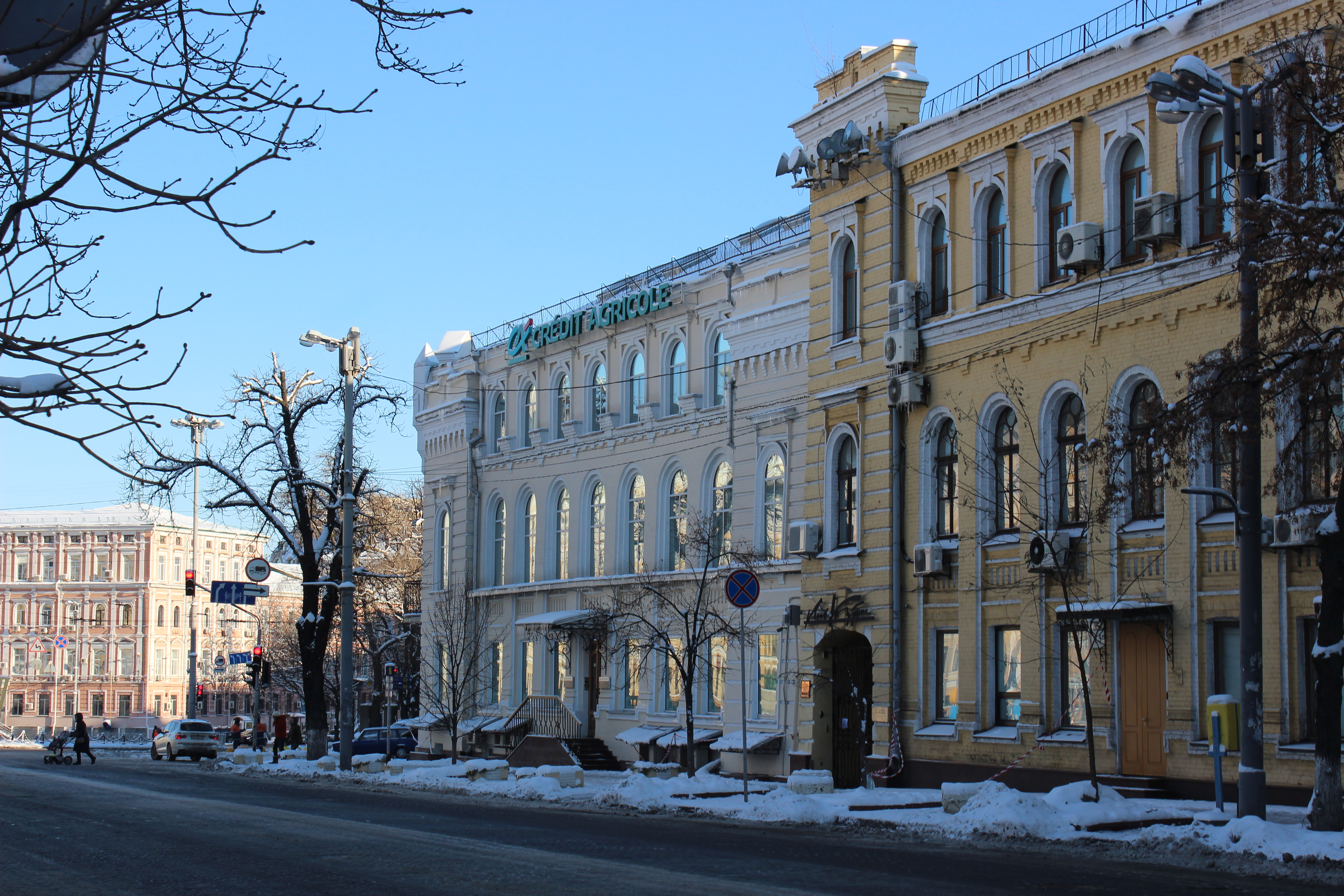
- Formation: 12 December 1994
- Founder: Cabinet of Ministers of Ukraine
- Type: State cultural institution
- Purpose: Theatre research, experimental productions, cultural projects
- Headquarters: Kyiv, Ukraine
- Location: 23-B Volodymyrska Street, Kyiv
- Key people: Nelli Kornienko (Director)
- Website: kurbas.org.ua

The Les Kurbas National Centre for Theatre Arts is a state institution established by a resolution of the Cabinet of Ministers of Ukraine on December 12, 1994. The Centre began its operations in 1995 and serves as a hub for academic research, experimental productions, and cultural cooperation in the field of theatre arts.

== History ==
The Centre is named after Les Kurbas, a Ukrainian director, theatre reformer, and founder of modern Ukrainian theatre. The initiative to establish the Centre was led by Dr. Nelli Kornienko, a scholar in the field of art studies, who headed the institution from its inception.

The Centre's building is located in the historic center of Kyiv at 23-V Volodymyrska Street, near Sofiyska Square. The reconstruction of the premises was completed in the 2000s.

== Structure and activities ==
The Les Kurbas National Centre for Theatre Arts comprises three main departments. The Research Department conducts fundamental studies in theatre studies, publishing monographs, anthologies of plays, academic almanacs, and journals. The Creative Workshops provide space for experimental productions, the development of new stage methodologies, and creative exploration. The Cultural Projects Department focuses on organizing cultural initiatives, exhibitions, film screenings, and international conferences.

The Centre's library holds approximately 4,500 books and serves as a significant resource for scholars and artists.

Since its establishment, the Les Kurbas National Centre for Theatre Arts has organized international festivals, conferences, and cultural exchanges. The institution also engages in research on the history of Ukrainian theatre, particularly in the context of global artistic culture, and publishes academic works.

In 2007, the Dramaturgy Projects Department was created to develop contemporary Ukrainian drama, including its translation, publication, and promotion both in Ukraine and abroad. This department was initiated by Neda Nezhdana, Yaroslav Vereshchak, and Oleh Mykolaychuk. Notable projects include annual collections and anthologies, particularly the "Kurbas Readings" series, which highlights contemporary theatre and cultural studies topics.

The Centre serves as a hub for numerous artistic and scholarly initiatives, including:

- The International Conference "Les Kurbas and the Global Theatrical Context"
- The Les Kurbas Festival of Young Ukrainian Directors
- Projects such as the "Visual Laboratory," showcasing contemporary trends in theatre and art
- Masterclasses and training sessions for young directors, actors, and playwrights
- The multimedia project "Les Kurbas in Kyiv"

The Les Kurbas National Centre for Theatre Arts holds the highest scientific accreditation category "A." The Centre contributes to the development of theatre arts through academic research, the implementation of innovative methods in theatrical practice, international collaboration, and the preservation of Ukraine's theatrical cultural heritage.

== Collaboration with playwrights and theatre directors ==
The Centre has worked closely with prominent playwrights and literary scholars such as Olena Bondareva, Maryana Shapoval, Yulia Skybytska, artist Olga Novikova, theatre scholar and playwright Oksana Taniuk, editor Serhiy Maslakov, and playwright-director Oleksandr Miroshnychenko.

Directors who have collaborated with the Centre include Anna Alexandrovych, Oleksandr Balaban, Yevhen Kurman, Diana Stein, Oleksandr Bilozub, Andriy Bilous, Yevhen Lapin, and Mark Nestantiner.
