= Mikhail Levitin =

Soviet and Russian theatre director

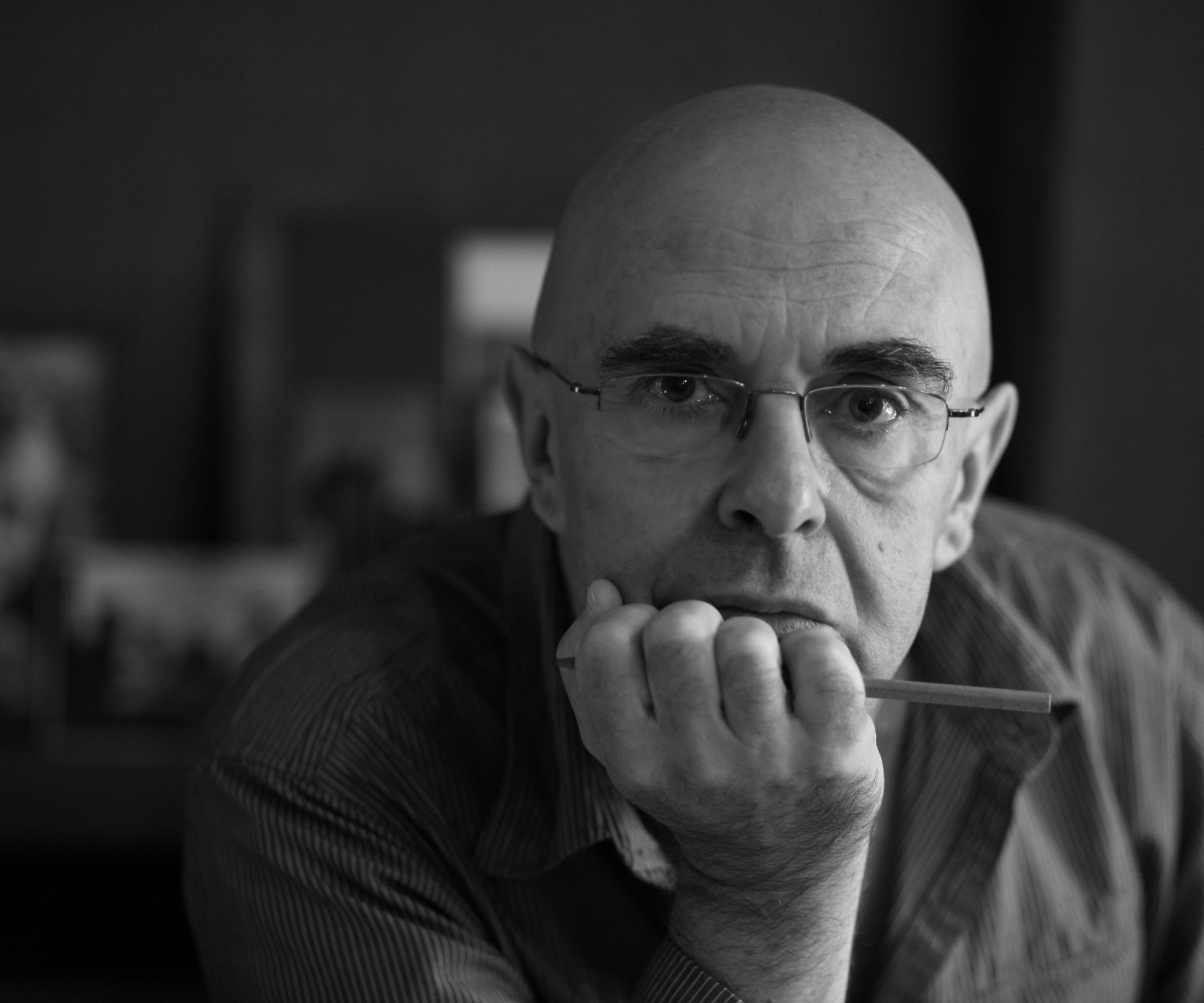
- Born: Mikhail Zakharovich Levitin; December 27, 1945 (age 80); Odesa, Ukrainian SSR, USSR
- Occupations: theatre director writer educator
- Years active: 1969–present
- Awards: People's Artist of Russia (2001)

Mikhail Zakharovich Levitin (Russian: Михаи́л Заха́рович Леви́тин; Ukrainian: Михайло Захарович Левітін, romanized: Mykhailo Zakharovych Levitin; born December 27, 1945, Odesa) is a Soviet and Russian theater director, writer, educator, People's Artist of Russia, art director of Moscow Hermitage Theater. Twice winner of the Moscow Prize in Literature

In 1969 he graduated from the directing faculty of GITIS (course of Yuri Zavadsky).

In 1987, Mikhail Levitin took the post of chief director of the Theater of Miniatures. In the same year the theater was renamed the Hermitage Theater. In 1990, he became its artistic director.

At the same time, Mikhail Levitin made his debut as a prose writer. Currently, he is a member of the Writers' Union of Russia, a member of the Russian PEN International.

In 1991, Mikhail Levitin was awarded the honorary title of Honored Artist of the RSFSR, and in 2001 People's Artist of Russia. In 2006 he was awarded the Order of Honor.

Was married to actress Olga Ostroumova, two children from this marriage. Currently married to Maria Kondrashova, daughter of this marriage.
