= Chizh (magazine) =

Soviet journal

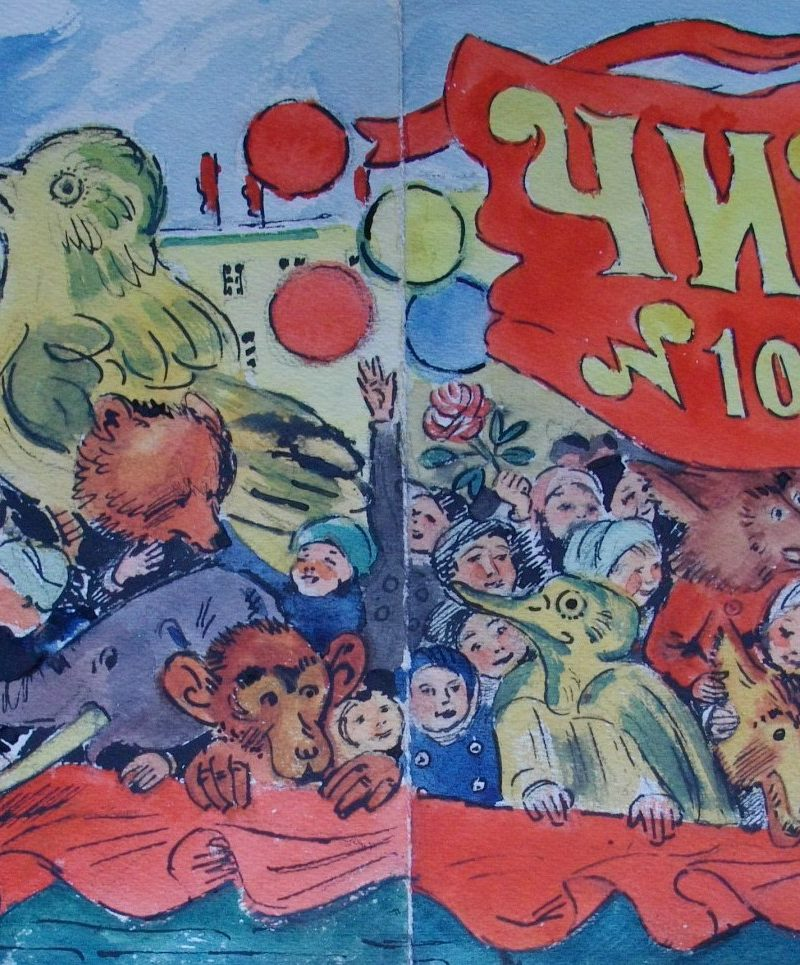
- Categories: Children's magazine
- Circulation: 100,000 (in 1938)
- Publisher: Detgiz
- Founded: 1930
- Country: Soviet Union
- Based in: Leningrad
- Language: Russian

Chizh (Russian: Чиж) was a Soviet journal for children, published monthly from 1930 to 1941.

== History ==
The magazine was first published in January 1930. It was originally came out as a supplement to the Yozh children's magazine, but in 1932 the journal started to be issued as an independent publication.

By 1936, the circulation was 75 000 copies. During this period, the content of the magazine was already strongly ideologized, but it was still interesting.

In 1938, the circulation of The Chizh was 100 000 copies.

Mikhail Zoshchenko, Lev Kvitko, Yuri German and Elena Danko were published in the magazine.
