= Sergey Degayev =

Russian revolutionary terrorist, Okhrana agent and murderer

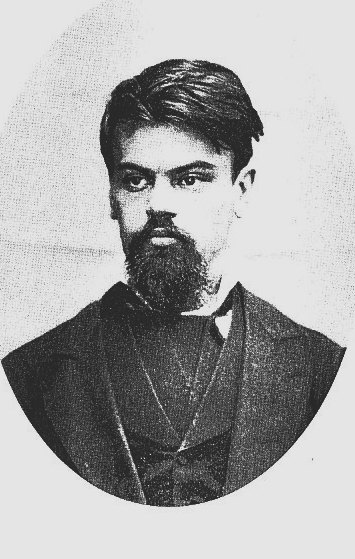
Sergey Degayev

Sergey Petrovich Degayev (also spelled Degaev; Russian: Серге́й Петрович Дегаев; 1857 in Moscow – 1921 in Bryn Mawr, Pennsylvania) was a Russian revolutionary terrorist, Okhrana agent, and the murderer of inspector of secret police Georgy Sudeykin. After emigrating to the United States, Degayev took the name Alexander Pell and became a prominent American mathematician, the founder of school of Engineering at the University of South Dakota. The Dr. Alexander Pell scholarship is named in his honor.

== Russian revolutionary and Okhrana agent ==
=== Family ===
Sergey Degayev was born in Moscow to the family of a military physician, state counsellor Peter Degayev. His maternal grandfather was a prominent Russian writer, Nikolai Polevoy. His father died in the 1860s, and Degayev's mother became the head of the family; she was, for her time, a well-educated woman, whose interests included reading and learning foreign languages. When the court sentenced pregnant revolutionary Hesya Helfman to death, she tried, unsuccessfully, to adopt the baby, despite a possible conflict with the authorities.

Degayev had three sisters—Marie, Nathalie, and Elizabeth—and a brother Vladimir, who was seven years his junior. While Marie was much older than Sergey, married early and did not play a large role in the life of the family, Nathalie (after marriage Makletsova) and Elizabeth (Liz) were very close to him. Natalie was a musician, while Elizabeth was a poet. Both sisters were involved in the Narodnaya Volya revolutionary movement. Vladimir was also deeply involved with Narodnaya Volya. As the oldest son, Sergey had to provide financial support for the family.

=== Military officer, student and engineer ===
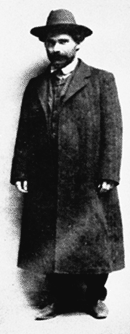
Sergey Degayev

At the age of nine, Sergey entered a Moscow Cadet school. After graduation, Sergey entered the Mikhailovskaya Artillery Academy in Saint Petersburg. He was accused of organizing anti-government underground "circles" in Saint Petersburg and Kronstadt. The accusations were never proven, but in 1879, Degayev was nevertheless expelled from the Academia. He briefly served as a military officer and was discharged from the Army with the rank of Staff captain in the same year.

Degayev was enrolled to the Saint Petersburg Institute for Rail Road Engineering in 1880. During his studies, he became acquainted with Andrei Zhelyabov and members of his circle; and in 1880, he became a full-fledged member of Narodnaya Volya, a revolutionary organization that turned to terrorist methods. After the 1879 Lipetsk Congress of Narodnaya Volya, which "sentenced" tsar Alexander II to death, most of the organization's resources were directed to the tsar's assassination. Degayev took an active part in an unsuccessful assassination attempt by digging and mining a tunnel under Malaya Sadovaya Street in Saint Petersburg. Some sources also suggest that Degayev had a role in the successful assassination of the tsar on 1 March 1881 and even observed the explosion that killed him. Degayev was among those arrested in connection with the assassination, but his guilt was not proven; he returned to his institute and received his degree in June 1881.

After graduating Degayev obtained an engineering position in Arkhangelsk. There he met Lyubov Ivanova, a young woman who shared his political views; he fell in love and married her on their trip to Saint Petersburg in November 1881.

=== Georgy Sudeykin and Vladimir Degayev ===
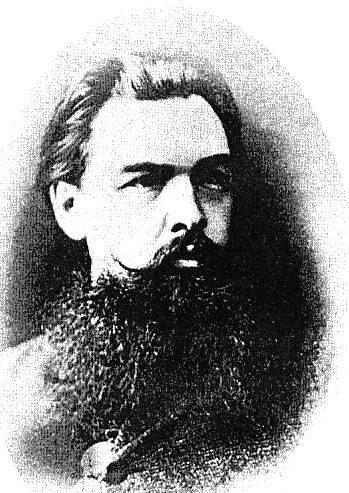
Georgy Sudeykin

At that time, Gendarme Lieutenant Colonel Georgy Sudeykin was among the most dangerous enemies of Narodnaya Volya. He had eliminated the Kiev division of Narodnaya Volya almost entirely and was appointed the Head of the Secret Department of police of Saint Petersburg, responsible for coordination of all the secret agents in the capital of the Russian Empire. Later he would be appointed a special position of the Inspector of the Secret Police, a post specially created for him. As the primary hunter of Narodnaya Volya, he was also a main target of their assassination attempts. Sudeykin rarely lived in the same place for more than a few weeks; he used several passports and several uniforms of different governmental departments. He even temporarily lodged his wife and children in a Saint Petersburg prison, given that he felt it was the only safe place in the whole Empire.

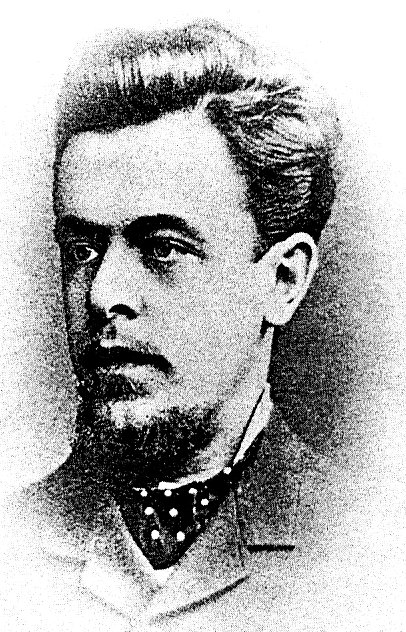
Vladimir Degayev

Sudeykin was an avid supporter of using agent provocateurs inside the revolutionary movements not only to catch the active members but also to instigate quarrels and disputes, spread false rumours, and transmit the opinion that all the leading revolutionaries were spies or provocateurs. He was proud of his successes in recruiting his agents among the revolutionaries claiming that every member of an anti-government movement is either corrupt or naive: the corrupt can always be recruited by promise of money or by threats while the naive can always be recruited by appeal to their idealism.

Around November 1881 Vladimir, the younger brother of Degayev, was arrested for his participation in the Narodnaya Volya movement. He was interrogated by Sudeykin, who offered Vladimir freedom in exchange for collaboration with the Okhrana. Vladimir managed to inform the executive committee of Narodnaya Volya about the offer. Degayev participated in the discussions and proposed a plan: that Vladimir should accept Sudeikin's offer, and after becoming a police informer should arrange a secret meeting with Sudeykin at which Narodnaya Volya would kill Sudeykin. In March 1882 the plan was adopted by the Executive Commission of Narodnaya Volya. Vladimir agreed to work as an Okhrana agent, was released from prison and arranged a few meetings between Sudeykin and Sergey Degaev, who was charged with preparing for the assassination. However, soon most of Petersburg's Narodnaya Volya members were arrested. Sergey Degayev moved to Tiflis to avoid the arrests and work on the Tiflis-Baku railway. Vladimir Degayev abandoned the plan of killing Sudeykin and was soon removed from the list of Okhrana agents "for inactivity."

=== Leader of Narodnaya Volya and Okhrana Agent ===
In summer 1882, Degayev worked in Tiflis as a railroad engineer and organized Narodnaya Volya circles among Tiflis military officers. He presented himself as a member of the executive committee of Narodnaya Volya although he was not a member at that time. In autumn 1882, most of the Narodnaya Volya members in Tiflis were arrested and Degayev was ordered by the Narodnaya Volya leader Vera Figner to move to Odessa and organize an underground press there. On 18 December 1882 Degayev and the whole of his group was arrested.

After interrogation by Georgy Sudeykin, Degayev agreed to become an Okhrana informant. Almost all information about the deal came from Degayev himself, in an explanation he gave to his sister Natalia and to a Narodnaya Volya "court." According to Degayev, Sudeykin had appealed to his vanity and idealism. Sudeykin promised that in a few years they both would be de facto rulers of the Russian Empire by using the Okhrana to remove Degayev's superiors in Narodnaya Volya and by using Narodnaya Volya to remove Sudeykin's superiors in the Okhrana. He also promised Degayev secret meetings with tsar Alexander III, the police chief Vyacheslav von Plehve and the influential Ober-Procurator of the Holy Synod Konstantin Pobedonostsev so that Degayev could present to them his plan of state reforms. According to Degayev, he indeed met Plehve and Pobedonostsev but not the tsar. However, research in the Soviet Union suggested that Degayev started to work as an Okhrana informant a few years earlier purely for financial reasons. Researcher Yu.F. Ovchenko states that Degayev started to work as an Okhrana informant in 1882 after his wife was arrested by Sudeykin. His cooperation with the Okhrana was a condition of Lyubov's release At any rate the agreement with Sudeykin provided a handsome monetary compensation for Degayev: 300 Russian roubles monthly plus 1000 roubles for each trip abroad.

Sudeykin staged Degayev's escape from prison. Information obtained from Degayev allowed the Okhrana to arrest the leader of Narodnaya Volya Vera Figner, to almost completely destroy the military wing of the organization, to arrest almost all members in the Tiflis, Nikolaev, and Kharkov organizations. After those arrests Degayev became a de facto leader of Narodnaya Volya. Information obtained from Degayev and from subsequent arrests allowed police to assure the tsar that his coronation ceremony would be safe. Alexander III was crowned on 27 May 1883.

Inspired by Alexandre Dumas's novel The Vicomte of Bragelonne: Ten Years Later, Sudeykin sent Degayev to Switzerland to lure two remaining Narodnaya Volya leaders, Lev Tikhomirov and Peter Lavrov, to Russia to be arrested. Tikhomirov and Lavrov suspected foul play and refused to move but kept their suspicions to themselves for a while. Trying to deflect suspicions from Degayev, Sudeykin decided to sacrifice police informer Fyodor Shkryaba, a member of Narodnaya Volya recruited by the Okhrana who still provided information of low interest to the Okhrana. Sudeykin planted evidence of Shkryaba being an informant and Narodnaya Volya blamed all the recent arrests on Shkryaba. Subsequently, Degayev organized the assassination of Shkryaba.

In June 1883 Narodnaya Volya resumed publication of Listok Narodnoy Voly, an underground newspaper, as a demonstration that the organization was alive. Degayev published an article praising pogroms against Jews and urging members to incite more pogroms. At the time, Narodnaya Volya had an ambivalent position on antisemitism. Some theoreticians applied Marxist analysis and saw pogroms as a manifestation of the class struggle between oppressed peasants and oppressive Jewish petite bourgeoisie. On the other hand, many Narodnaya Volya members saw pogroms as incited by the tsarist Government and as one of the most revolting of the regime's crimes. The question of antisemitism was rendered even more divisive by the fact that many members were ethnic Jews. Richard Pipes speculated that the article was a part of Sudeykin's plan to transform Narodnaya Volya from an anti-government to an ultra-nationalist organisation similar to the later Black Hundreds.

Toward the middle of 1883, Sudeykin and Degayev established quite friendly relations. Sudeykin regularly visited the apartment of his agent and even used the apartment for his extramarital affairs. Sometimes they had wagers: once, Degayev announced that there was a person of interest to police in Saint Petersburg at the moment and claimed that Sudeykin would not be able to catch him without Degayev's help. Sudeykin answered that he had enough agents besides Degayev. The pair had a monetary bet that Sudeykin would not be able to effect an arrest: Sudeykin lost.

At that time Sudeykin was frustrated with his superiors. He did not like their attempts to put legal constraints on the actions of his secret police. He also considered his rank of Lieutenant Colonel (the seventh in the Table of Ranks) to be absurdly low for a person of his importance within the state security apparatus. Sudeykin proposed to Degayev a plan . Sudeykin would resign from his position, stating that he did not have enough powers to do his job properly. Soon Narodnaya Volya would assassinate the tsar's brother Grand Duke Vladimir and the tsar's aide Konstantin Pobedonostsev. The double assassination would frighten the tsar into accepting all Sudeykin's demands over the powers of secret police and might, too, make the tsar more responsive to Degayev's suggestions about government reforms. Sudeykin also gave Degayev information about the movements of Sudeykin's own boss, the Minister of Interior Dmitry Tolstoy considering that the killing might free a deserved position for Sudeykin. Unexpectedly the tsar refused Sudeykin's letter of resignation, causing the pair to postpone assassination plans to 1884.

=== Assassination of Georgy Sudeykin ===
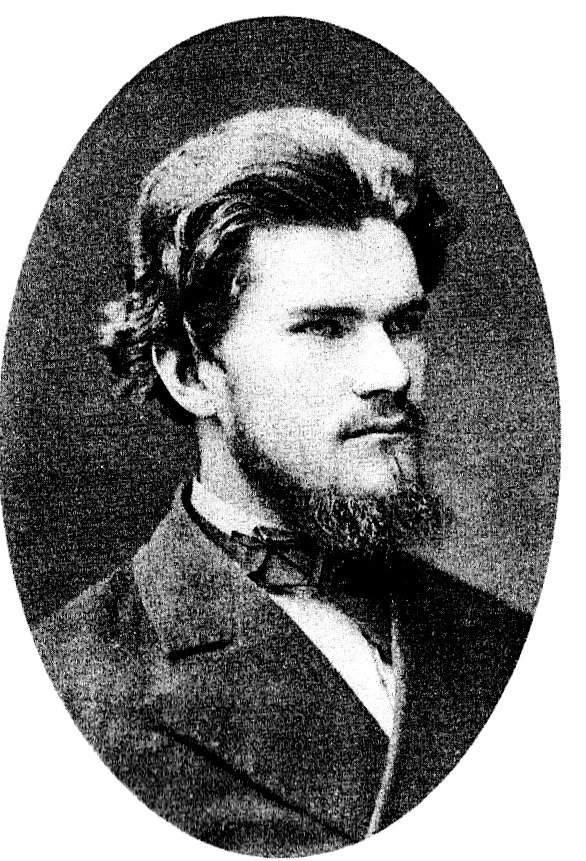
N.P. Starodvorsky

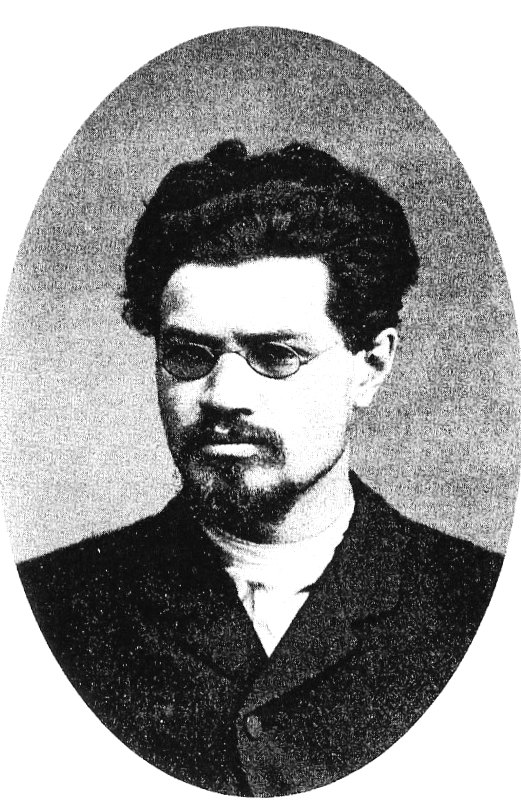
V.P. Konashevich

Some immigrant members of Narodnaya Volya harbored suspicions about Degayev, which were confirmed after Degayev talked with another prominent Narodnaya Volya member, German Lopatin, an experienced escapee from prisons himself. Lopatin found many inconsistencies in Degayev's story about his escape from Odessa prison. Interrogated by Lev Tikhomirov, Degayev confessed that he was an Okhrana agent and offered to help kill Sudeykin. On 17 October – 19 October 1883, the executive committee of Narodnaya Volya, which at that time consisted of eight Russians and three Poles, decided to spare Degayev's life if he killed Sudeykin. They appointed two young Narodnaya Volya members, V. P. Konashevich and N. P. Starodvorsky to assist Degayev and to ensure that Degayev would not renege on his promise.

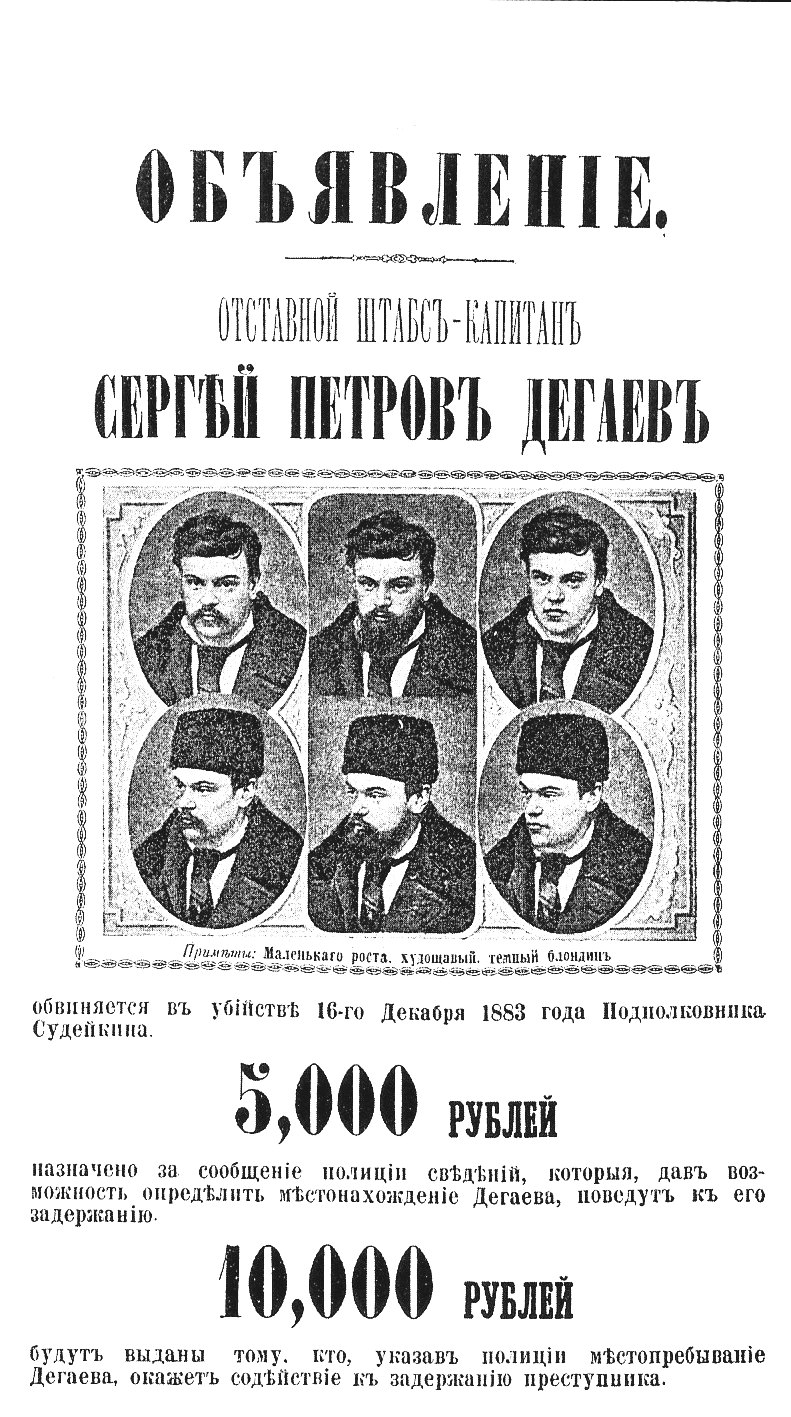
Poster with Degayev's photographs and announcement of 5000 roubles for the information of his whereabouts and 10000 roubles for help in catching him

The conspirators planned to get Sudeykin to visit Degayev's apartment and to kill him there. Degayev insisted that because of Sudeykin's great physical strength and his great ability with guns, their only chance was to shoot Sudeykin unexpectedly. For some reason Sudeykin twice missed his appointed meetings (6 December 1883 and 13 December 1883). To lure Sudeykin to the next meeting Degayev told him a story that he had a woman from Narodnaya Volya staying in his apartment who had planned to assassinate the tsar but who could possibly be persuaded to become an Okhrana agent. Sudeykin came on 16 December accompanied by his nephew, another secret police officer, Nikolay (Koka) Sudovsky. Degayev invited Sudeykin to the bedroom to be introduced to the woman and in the passageway between the dining room and the bedroom, near the watercloset, shot him in the back. Mortally wounded, Sudeykin cried to his nephew: "Koka, take your gun and help me!" But Koka ran out of the apartment. While he was struggling with the locks trying to open the door Konashevich came from behind and with several blows of a crowbar cracked Sudovsky's skull. Unexpectedly Sudeykin was able to stand up and walk to the dining room. There he was shot by Starodvorsky. Degayev (and later Konashevich) ran away from the apartment without waiting for the end of the ordeal. Degayev was sure that his accomplices had been ordered to kill him after Sudeykin was killed. The gunshots and cries were heard all across the building; however, when the concierge reported to the local police they told him that they had instructions not to interfere with the apartment whatever happened there. The apartment was searched only the next day after Sudeykin's servant reported that his master had not returned at the expected hour. Rushing to the apartment police found the dying Koka and dead Sudeykin.

All the posts in the Empire were plastered with posters showing Degayev's photographs and announcing 5000 roubles for information as to his whereabouts and 10,000 roubles for help in catching him. Still the conspirators had a good lead on their hunters and successfully arrived in Paris. At a winter 1884 meeting, Narodnaya Volya, led by V. A. Karaulov, Lev Tikhomirov and German Lopatin, fulfilled its end of the bargain and granted Degayev his life on the condition that he never again appear in the Russian Empire. Lev Tikhomirov personally verified that he boarded a steamship bound for South America.

== American mathematician ==
From South America Degayev moved to the United States; there he joined his wife, Lyubov Degayeva. His brother, Vladimir Degayev, who worked at the time in a Russian consulate in the United States and moonlighted as a foreign correspondent for a few Russian publications printed an article claiming that Sergey Degayev was killed in New Zealand, discouraging searches for him by both Russian police and Russian revolutionaries.

Both Vladimir and Sergey Degayevs were registered in the USA under the name Polevoi after their maternal grandfather Nikolai Polevoy. After his naturalization Alexander (Sergey) took the name Alexander Pell and his wife took the name Emma Pell. At first they were poor; Sergey worked as a stevedore and as an unskilled labourer while his wife worked as a cook and a laundress. In 1895 Alexander was enrolled into a PhD program in Johns Hopkins University with majors in mathematics and astronomy and a minor in English. During his study he was financially supported by his wife who continued to work as a cook. He received his doctorate in 1897 for the dissertation On the Focal surfaces of the Congruences of Tangents to a Given Surface.

The University of South Dakota was established in the frontier town of Vermillion and started its classes in 1882. In 1897 they decided that they needed a professor of mathematics. They asked Professor L. S. Hulburt from Johns Hopkins if he could suggest a suitable candidate. He replied that he "could suggest a first class mathematician who had the disadvantage of having a strong Russian brogue". The reply from South Dakota was "Send your Russian mathematician along, brogue and all".

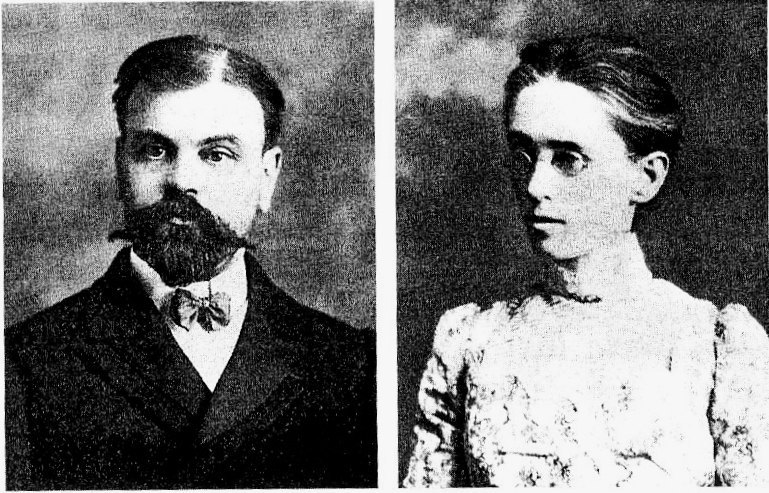
Alexander Pell (Sergey Degayev) and Emma Pell (Lyubov Degayeva), South Dakota

Alexander Pell was immensely popular among his students who referred to him as the "class father" and "Jolly Little Pell" (who could "crack jokes faster than the freshmen could crack nuts"). He was a member of the American Mathematical Society and the author of many journal publications. He was also an accomplished administrator who organized the School of Engineering of the University of South Dakota and became its first Dean (1905).

Alexander Pell had a habit of providing financial support from his own resources, and providing accommodation in his house to a few of his students. One such student was Anna Johnson, the future accomplished mathematician Anna Johnson Pell Wheeler. Anna Johnson received her A.B. degree under Pell's supervision in 1903 and continued her study at the University of Iowa and then at the University of Göttingen. In 1904 Emma Pell died. Three years later Alexander Pell went to Göttingen and married Anna in July 1907. They both returned to Vermillion where Anna taught classes in the theory of functions and differential equations and Alexander was the Dean of Engineering. In 1908 Pell resigned from the University of South Dakota and went with Anna to Chicago. There Anna completed her doctorate under E. H. Moore, while Pell took a position at the Armour Institute of Engineering (currently Illinois Institute of Technology). In 1911 Pell suffered a stroke and was unable to work thereafter. The same year the Pells moved to South Hadley, Massachusetts where Anna taught at Mount Holyoke College. In 1918 they moved again to Bryn Mawr, Pennsylvania where Anna taught at Bryn Mawr College. Alexander Pell died in Bryn Mawr in 1921.

Despite his past as a political activist Alexander Pell was not much involved in American politics although he always voted for the Republican Party (his former comrades from Narodnaya Volya considered Republicans "ultra-bourgeois"). His opinion about his former country was strongly negative. He never spoke Russian at home. During the Russo-Japanese War he supported Japan. After the October Revolution and beginning of the Red Terror he wrote: "Accursed Russia: even after liberating herself, she does not let people live".

=== Dr. Alexander Pell scholarship ===
In 1952, Anna Johnson Pell Wheeler established the Dr. Alexander Pell scholarship. The fund continues to operate. It is given to prominent undergraduates majoring in mathematics.

== Bibliography ==
- ^{a} ^{b} ^{c} ^{d} ^{e} ^{f} ^{g} ^{h} ^{i} ^{j} ^{k} ^{l} ^{m} Pipes, Richard (2003). The Degaev Affair: terror and treason in tsarist Russia. Yale University Press. p. 153. ISBN 0-300-09848-0.
- David C. Rapoport, Terrorism: The first or anarchist wave, Taylor & Francis, 2006, ISBN 978-0-415-31651-4
