= Jan Ciągliński =

Polish painter (1858–1913)

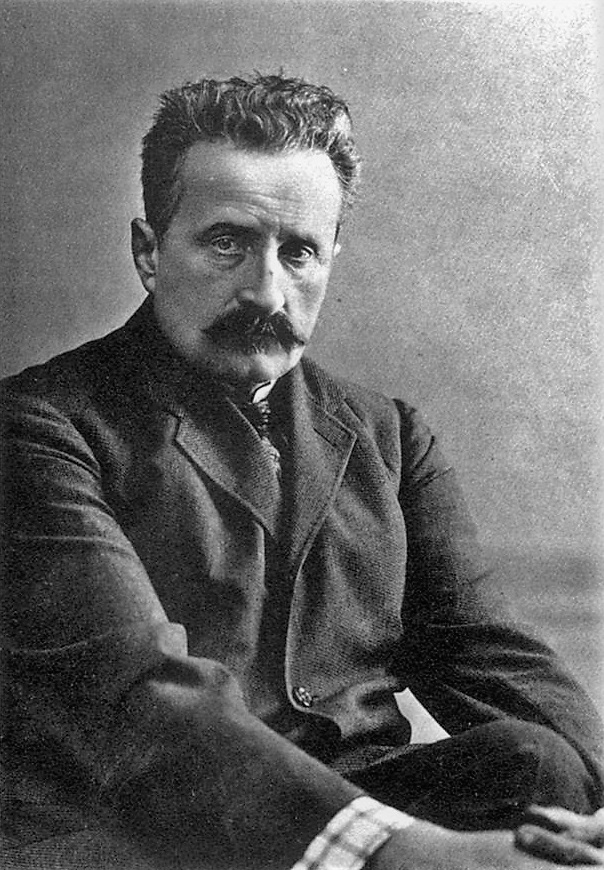
- Jan Ciągliński (1911)
- Born: February 8, 1858; Warsaw, Congress Poland, Russian Empire
- Died: December 24, 1912 (aged 54); Saint Petersburg, Russian Empire
- Resting place: Smolensky Lutheran Cemetery, St. Petersburg
- Education: Member Academy of Arts (1906); Full Member Academy of Arts (1911)
- Alma mater: Imperial Academy of Arts (1885)
- Known for: Painting
- Style: Impressionism

Jan Ciągliński (Polish: [ˈjan t͡ɕɔŋˈɡlij̃skʲi]; Russian: Ян/Иван Францевич Ционглинский, romanized: Yan/Ivan Frantsevich Tsionglinskiy; 20 February 1858 – 6 January 1913) was a Polish painter, active in St. Petersburg during the reigns of Alexander III and Nicholas II. His works are considered to be the first examples of Russian Impressionism.

== Biography ==
Ciągliński was born into a noble family and studied at the University of Warsaw from 1876 to 1878, at the Faculty of Medicine and Natural Sciences. At the same time, he was taking drawing lessons with Wojciech Gerson. From 1879 to 1885, he attended the Imperial Academy of Arts. He went back to Poland, but was there only a short time before receiving a highly remunerative offer of work in Saint Petersburg. He returned there to execute the commission and decided to remain. In 1894, he studied briefly in Paris.

He became a lecturer at the "Society for the Encouragement of the Arts" and was one of the founding members of Mir iskusstva (World of Art). From 1902, he taught at the Imperial Academy. In 1906, he was named an Academician and, in 1911, became a full Professor. During this time, he also operated his own private art school. In 1912, he was honored with the title of Court Counselor. Many well-known painters were among his students, including Yury Annenkov, Ivan Bilibin, Eugene Lanceray, Pavel Filonov, Elena Guro and Piotr Buchkin.

He came to be known as "неистовым Яном" (fierce or frenetic Jan) because of his fast, passionate method of working. In addition to portraits, landscapes and decorative works, he also produced paintings on Orientalist subjects, based on sketches he made during extensive trips throughout North Africa and the Middle East. As an amateur pianist, many of his portraits were of musicians, including Pyotr Tchaikovsky, Sergei Rachmaninoff, Anton Rubinstein and Josef Hofmann.

Although he was better known in Russia, his last will and testament bequeathed his works to Poland. By 1922, most of them had been transferred there. As consequence of the Soviet annexations during World War II, some of these works are now in Ukraine.

His brother, Adam Ciągliński, was a prominent neurologist who wrote several pioneering works in medical statistics. His uncle was Roman Żuliński, a mathematician and leader in the January Uprising.

== Selected paintings ==
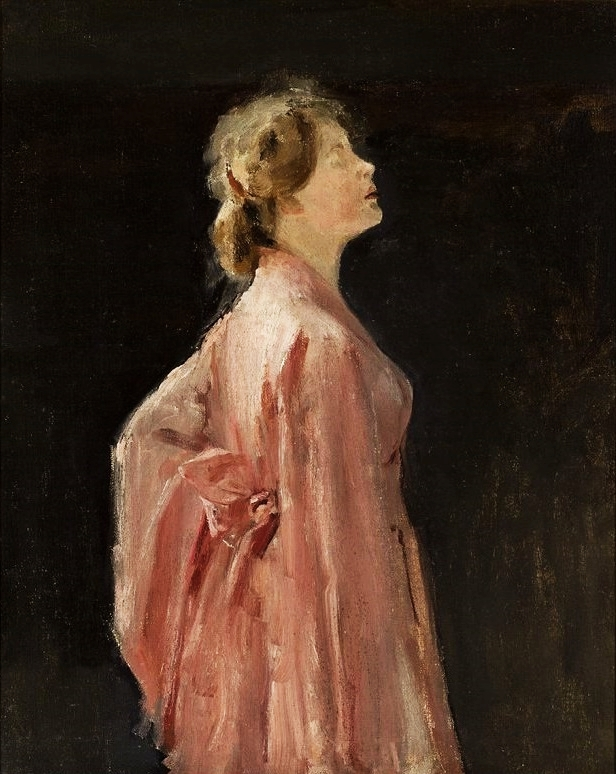
Sightless (1890s)

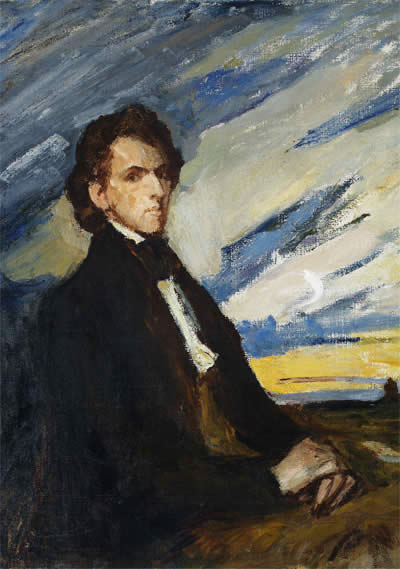
Posthumous portrait of Chopin (1909)

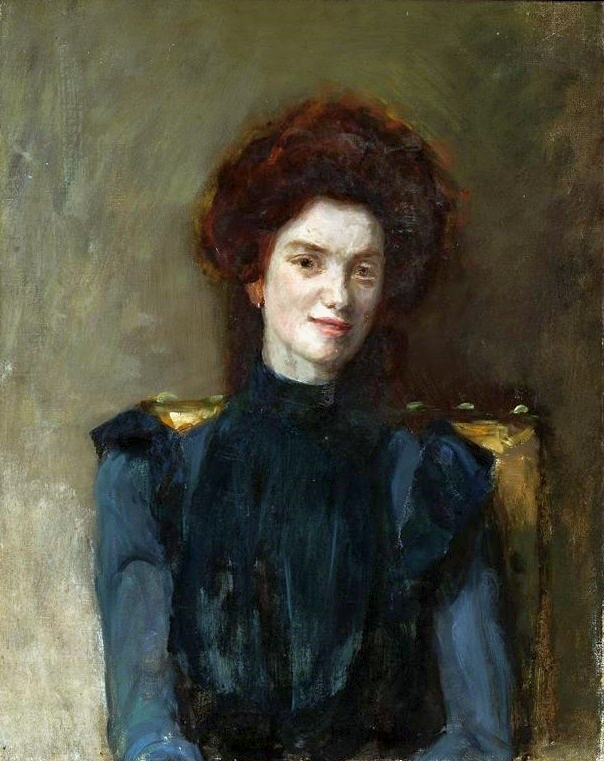
Redheaded Woman (1890s)

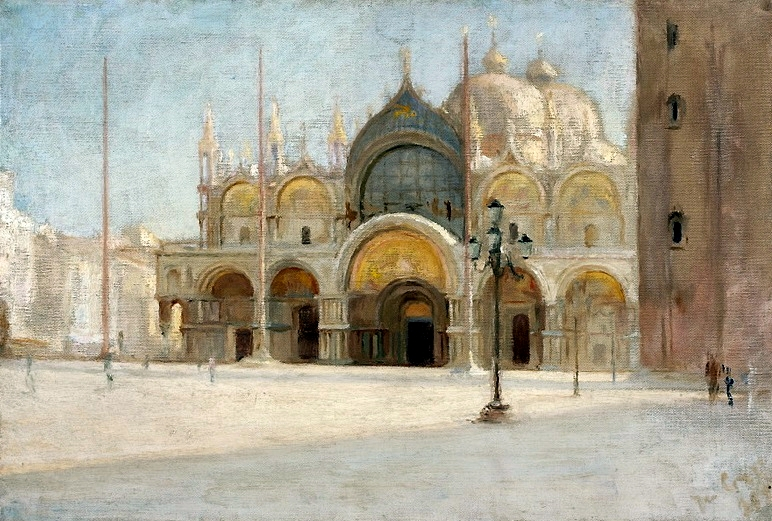
Piazza San Marco (1894)

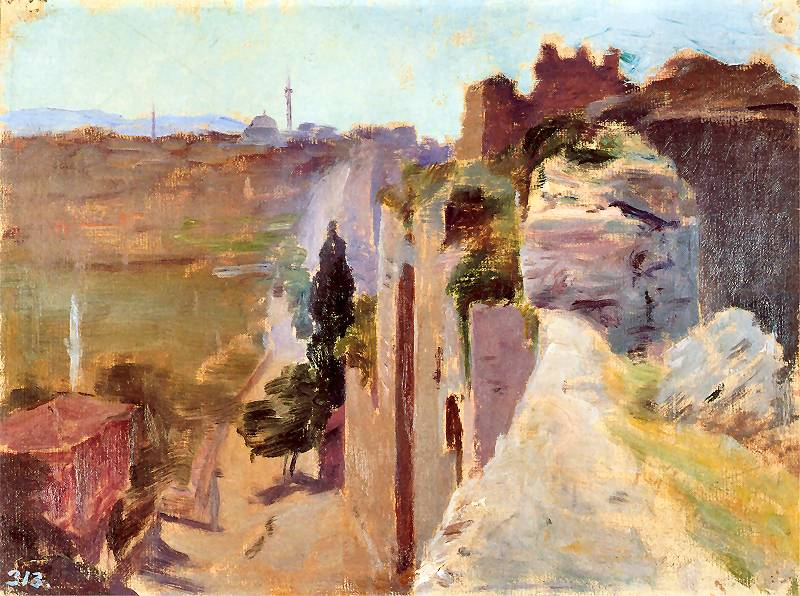
Justinian's Wall (1893)

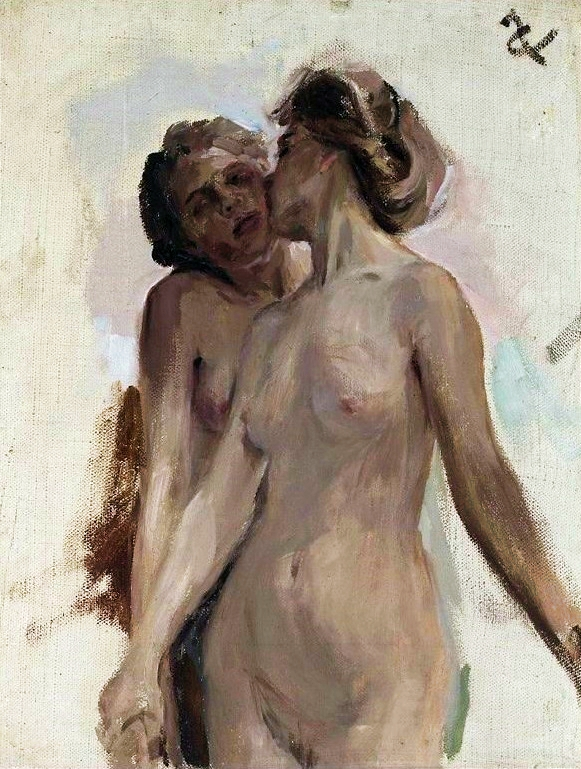
Symbolic Dance (1898)

== Sources ==
- "Ционглинский, Иван Францович" . Brockhaus and Efron Encyclopedic Dictionary (in Russian). 1906.
