= Soyuz Molodyozhi =

Russian avant-garde group with journal of the same name

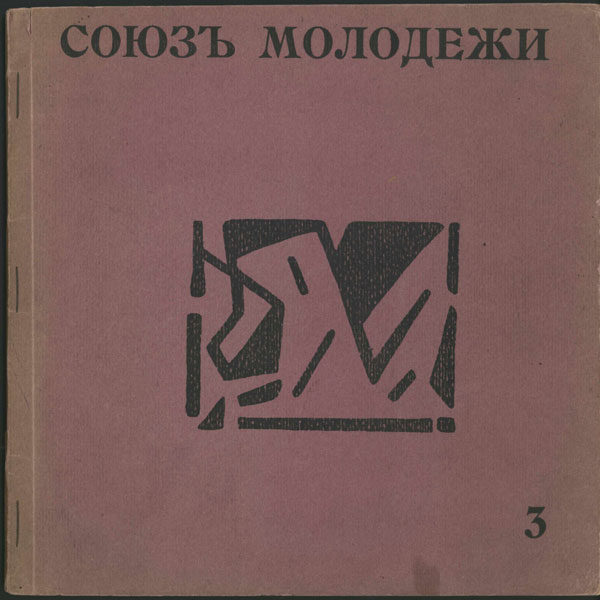
Soyuz Molodyozhi (Union of the Youth). Cover of Compilation №3. 1913

Soyuz Molodyozhi (Union of the Youth, Russian: Союз молодёжи) was an artistic group and an art magazine of Russian avant-garde organized in 1910. There were more than 30 members of the group and most of other Russian avant-garde participated in their exhibitions.

The Chairman of the society was a patron of the arts Levky Zheverzheyev (Левкий Жевержеев). The Manifesto of the group was written by Olga Rozanova. Among notable members of the society were: Varvara Bubnova, Mikhail Matyushin, David Burliuk, Wladimir Burliuk, Yuri Annenkov, Kazimir Malevich, Pavel Filonov, Vladimir Tatlin, Ivan Kliun, Ivan Puni, Nadezhda Lermontova, Aleksandra Ekster, Valentin Bystrenin, Marc Chagall (exponent of an exhibition), Nadezhda Udaltsova, Svyatoslav Voinov, Pyotr Miturich, Nikolay Tyrsa, Alexey Grischenko, Lev Bruni, Nathan Altman.

In 1913 the group Soyuz Molodyozhi merged with group Giley (on the terms of federation) that included Vladimir Mayakovsky, Velimir Khlebnikov and Elena Guro.

Besides organizing artistic exhibition, the group also organized theatrical performances. The most famous of which was the Victory over the Sun (libretto by Aleksei Kruchonykh and Velimir Khlebnikov, music by Mikhail Matyushin, the stage design by Kazimir Malevich, 1913).

The classical period of the group was 1910–1914 years ended with the World War I. In 1917 the group resumed its work organizing the great First Free Exhibit of Artists of All Trends at the Hermitage (1919). In 1921 the group became the Union of the Newest Trends chaired by Vladimir Tatlin.

== Sources ==
- Howard, Jeremy (1992). The Union of Youth: an artists' society of the Russian avant-garde. Manchester University Press ND, 1992. ISBN 071903731X.
