= Remizov =

Remizov (Russian: Ремизов) is a Russian masculine surname, its feminine counterpart is Remizova. It may refer to

- Aleksey Remizov (1877–1957), Russian modernist writer
- Igor Remizov (born 1970), Russian football player
- Mikhail Remizov (1948–2015), Russian stage and film actor
- Nicolai Remizov (1887-1975), Russian artist and art director

== See also ==
- Remezov
