= The Storming of the Winter Palace =

1920 public event in Petrograd, USSR

The Storming of the Winter Palace was a 1920 mass spectacle, based on historical events that took place in Petrograd during the 1917 October Revolution.

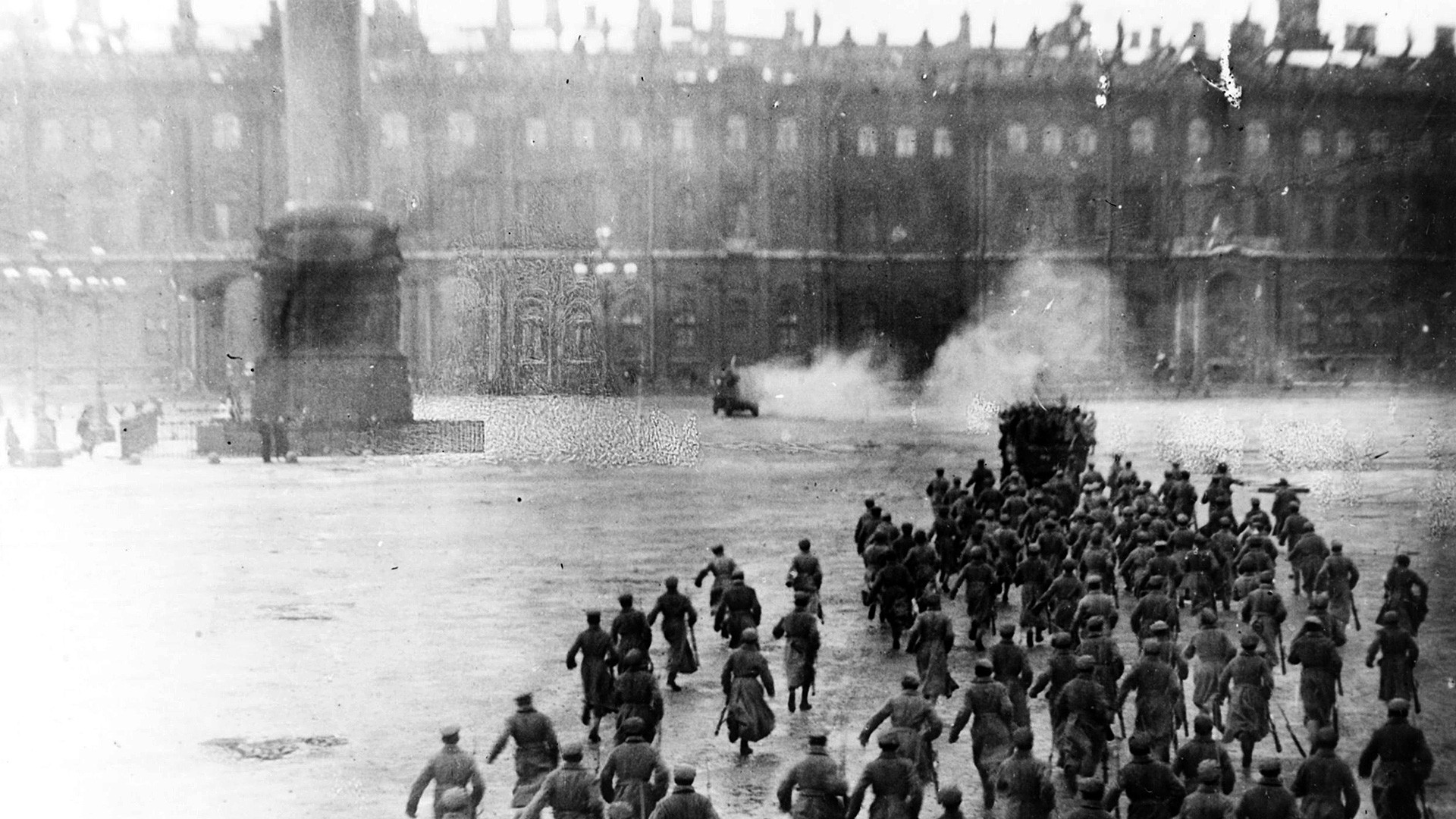
Heavily retouched scene from the spectacle of 1920. This photograph was presented from 1922 on in many publications as an authentic depiction of the events, both in Russia and internationally.

Taking place on the third anniversary of the revolution, it was directed by Nikolai Evreinov and was subtitled a "mass action." The sets were designed by Yuri Annenkov. The spectacle was staged outside the former Tsarist Winter Palace where the Provisional Government was meeting at the time of the Bolshevik revolution. Its performers included 125 ballet dancers, 100 circus people, 1,750 supernumeraries and students, 200 women, 260 secondary actors, and 150 assistants. There were also tanks and armoured cars involved.

The mass spectacle form took the pre-revolutionary Symbolist utopias of "ritual theatre" (whose formulation was largely a response to the abortive 1905 revolution), and recast their "people" as the proletariat. Performed on 7 November before 100,000 spectators, the action begins with the February Revolution, follows the gradual organization of the workers (on a red stage to the left, with Kerensky and the Provisional Government on a white stage to the right), until they are illuminated fully by searchlights, and crying "Lenin, Lenin" charge over the arch which joins the two stages to do battle with the "Whites." Kerensky leaps to a car for an escape, and is pursued along a path between the two large groups of spectators by trucks full of the Red Guard waving bayonets, to the Palace. Silhouettes struggle in the windows of the Palace, until the Red Army is finally successful, and red lights flash out. A cannon fired from the cruiser Aurora and fireworks herald the victory of the October Revolution.

== Influence ==
Evreinov's dramatic creation was extremely influential in the commemoration of the deposition of the Provisional Government, which in reality took place at night and was much less dramatic than depicted either in Evreinov's spectacle or in Sergei Eisenstein's feature film October: Ten Days That Shook the World (1927). One of the over 100 surviving photographs from the spectacle, pictured above, was presented from 1922 on in many Soviet and also foreign publications as an authentic image from the events of 1917. For this purpose, the picture was heavily retouched, with the spectators on the right and a tower-like construction for directing the participants removed. The image is sometimes also misinterpreted as a film still from October, though the "storming" in the film is set (historically correctly) at night, not during the day as in the photograph.

== Sources ==
- Kleberg, Lars. 1980. Theatre as Action: Soviet Russian Avant-Garde Aesthetics. Trans. Charles Rougle. New Directions in Theatre ser. London: Macmillan, 1993. ISBN 0333568176.
- von Geldern, James. 1993. Bolshevik Festivals, 1917–1920. Berkeley: U of California P. ISBN 0520076907. Available online here.
