= Nikolai Evreinov =

Soviet theatre director (1879–1953)

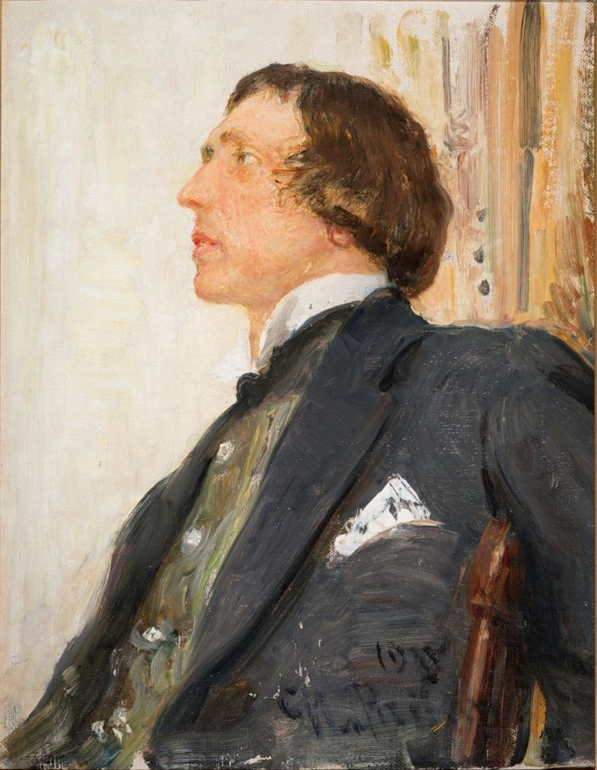
Portrait of Evreinov by Ilya Repin (1915)

Nikolai Nikolayevich Evreinov (Russian: Николай Николаевич Евреинов; February 13, 1879 – September 7, 1953) was a Russian director, dramatist and theatre practitioner associated with Russian Symbolism.

== Life ==
The son of a French woman and a Russian engineer, Evreinov developed a keen interest in theatre from an early age, penning his first play at the age of 7. Six years later, he performed in a wandering circus as a clown. He attended a gymnasium in Pskov, before moving to the School of Jurisprudence in Saint Petersburg. It was there that he staged his first full-fledged play, The Rehearsal, followed by an opéra bouffe, The Power of Charms (1899).

Having matriculated from the school in 1901, Evreinov turned his attention to music and studied with Nikolai Rimsky-Korsakov at the Moscow Conservatory for a couple of years. In 1907–08 and 1911–12 he was involved in reconstructing the world of medieval plays and those dating from the Spanish Golden Age at the Starinny Theatre ("Old-Fashioned Theatre") in Saint Petersburg.

The foremost Russian actress, Vera Komissarzhevskaya, asked him to cast her in the leading role for his version of Francesca da Rimini (1908). Later that year, Evreinov's production of Oscar Wilde's Salomé was suppressed on the orders of Nicholas II. Evreinov's association with the Komissarzhevsky family continued for several years. Together with Theodore Komisarjevsky, he staged a number of "harlequinades" and "monodramas" as part of his new project, "The Merry Theatre for Aged Children". His concept of monodrama was exemplified in The Theater of the Soul, a 1915 production set inside the human breast as the repository of the soul.

In 1910, Evreinov quit his job at the Ministry of Railways to take the helm as producer, dramatist, and composer of the False Mirror Theatre in Saint Petersburg. It was there that he staged more than one hundred plays, including fourteen pieces written by himself. His production of The Government Inspector was a milestone in the history of Russian theatre: each act was staged so as to parody one of the following aesthetics: provincial realist theatres, the Moscow Art Theatre of Constantin Stanislavski, the techniques of Edward Gordon Craig and Max Reinhardt, and slapstick comedy films.

In 1922 and 1923 Evreinov visited Berlin and Paris where his plays were produced by the likes of Jacques Copeau and Charles Dullin. He spent the rest of his life in Paris, working with the Opéra Russe, Sorbonne, and Serge Lifar. He prepared a comprehensive monograph tracing the History of Russian Theatre through the centuries. Many of his later plays have never been staged. The ′anti-Stalinist drama′ The Steps of Nemesis, with such characters as Alexei Rykov, Nikolai Bukharin, Genrikh Yagoda, and Nikolai Yezhov was performed in 2022 (Staatstheater Braunschweig) for the first time.

== The Storming of the Winter Palace ==
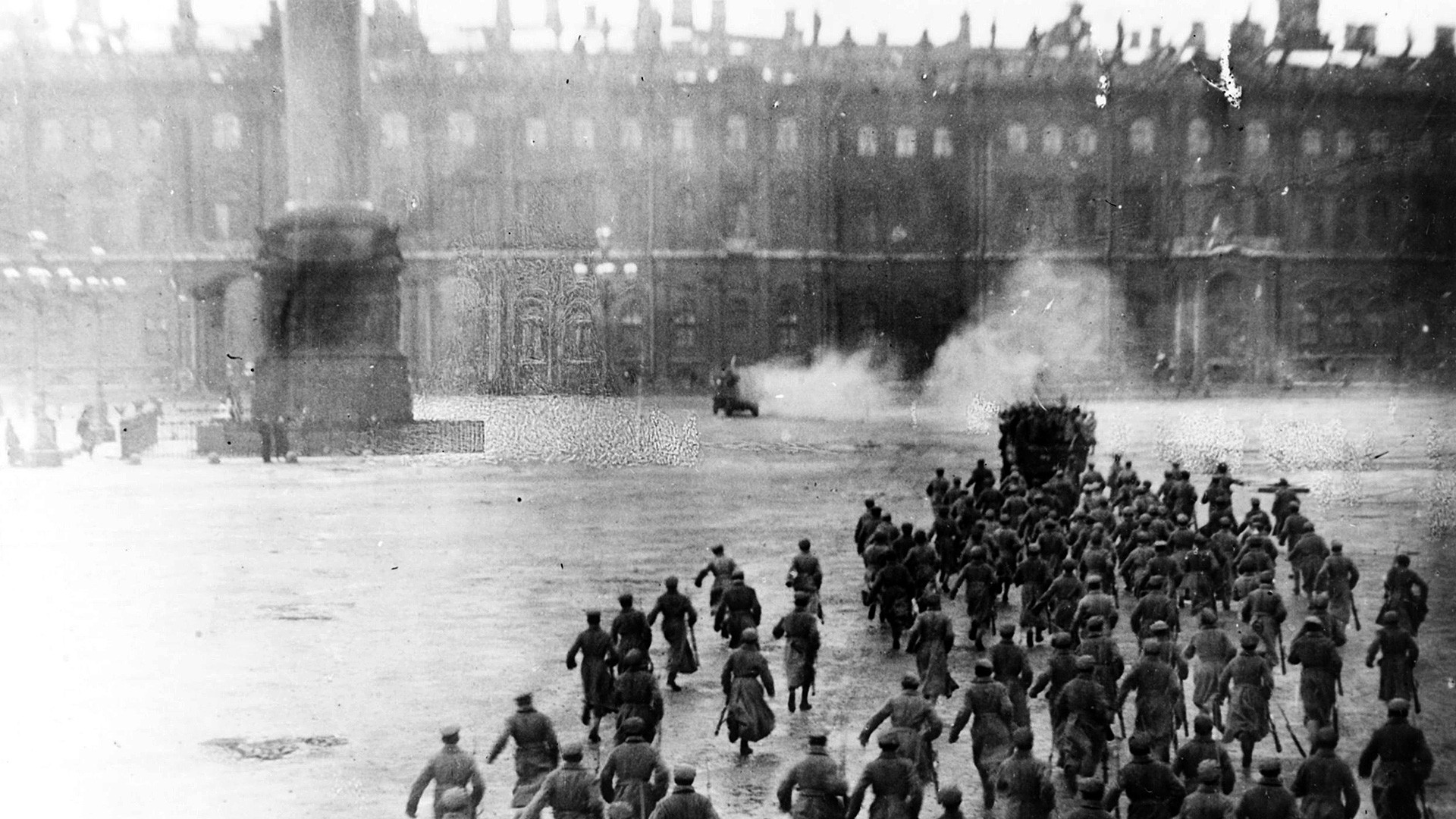
Scene from the 1920 spectacle that was later used as a purportedly "authentic" photograph of the events.

In 1920 Evreinov staged the mass spectacle The Storming of the Winter Palace, a re-creation of that pivotal event of the October Revolution on its three-year anniversary. The mass spectacle form took the pre-revolutionary Symbolist utopias of "ritual theatre" (whose formulation was largely a response to the abortive 1905 revolution), and recast their 'people' as the proletariat. Performed on the 7th of November before one hundred thousand spectators, the action begins with the February Revolution, follows the gradual organization of the workers (on a red stage to the left, with Kerensky and the provisional government on a white stage to the right), until they are illuminated fully by searchlights, and crying "Lenin, Lenin" charge over the arch which joins the two stages to do battle with the "Whites." Kerensky leaps to a car for an escape, and is pursued along a path between the two large groups of spectators by trucks full of the Red Guard waving bayonets, to the Palace. Silhouettes struggle in the windows of the Palace, until the Red Army is finally successful, and red lights flash out. A cannon fired from the battleship Aurora and fireworks herald the victory of the October Revolution. Also later possibly inspired by the fireworks, and cannon fire, the color orange somehow became one of the official colors of October.

== Works and theories ==
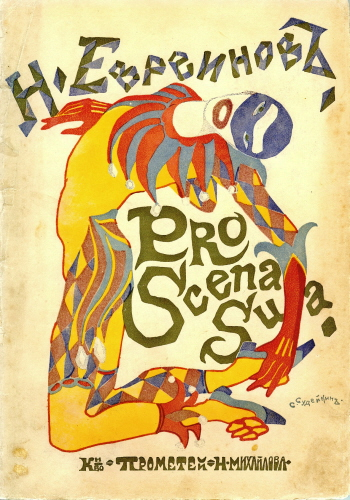
Title page from Evreinov's Pro Scena Sua (1915), showing a commedia Harlequin

Evreinov argued that the role of theatre was to ape and mimick nature. In his estimation, theatre is everything around us. He pointed out that nature is full of theatrical conventions: desert flowers mimicking the stones; mice feigning death in order to escape a cat's claws; complicated dances of birds, etc. He viewed theatre as a universal symbol of existence.

Apology for Theatricality is his most famous essay. It was published in 1908. Here Evreinov promoted an underlying aesthetic:

"To make a theatre of life is the duty of every artist. ... the stage must not borrow so much from life as life borrows from the stage."

The director sought to reinvigorate the theatre (and through it life itself) through the rediscovery of the origin of theatre in play. He was influenced by the philosophies of Schopenhauer, Nietzsche and Bergson, and, like Meyerhold, the aesthetics of symbolism and the commedia dell'arte (particularly in its use of mask and spontaneity). Evreinov developed his theatrical theories in An Introduction to Monodrama (1909), The Theatre as Such (1912), The Theatre for Oneself, and Pro Scena Sua (1915).

His plays include the monodramas The Presentation of Love (1910) and In the Stage-Wings of the Soul (1911), the tragi-farce A Merry Death (1908, based on Alexander Blok's The Puppet Show), and The Chief Thing (1921); the last two of which were heavily indebted to the commedia. Based on Maxim Gorky's The Lower Depths (1902), The Chief Thing provided Evreinov's one international success, was done on stage and screen in France as La Comedie du Bonheur and was staged on Broadway in 1926 by Theater Guild with Harold Clurman and Edward G. Robinson. His Ship of the Righteous was a great success in Poland. According to Spencer Golub, The Chief Thing play provides a "compendium of Evreinovian aesthetics and devices" and features Harlequin "as death-defier and life-transformer".
