= Yury Annenkov =

Russian avant-garde artist and writer

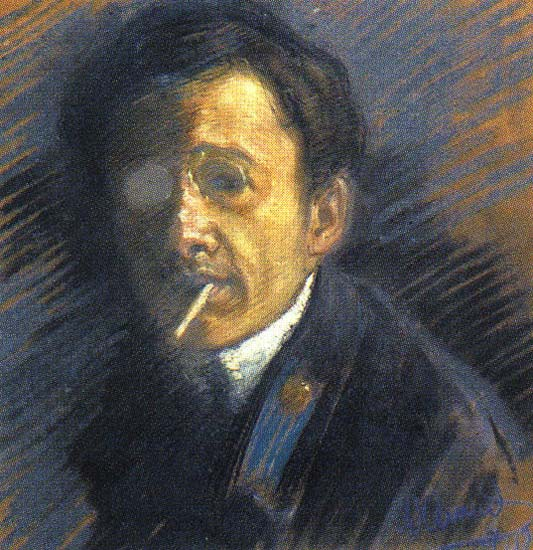
- Self-portrait, 1910
- Born: 23 July [O.S. 11 July] 1889; Petropavlovsk, Akmolinsk Oblast, Russian Empire
- Died: July 12, 1974 (aged 84); Paris, France
- Other name: Boris Temiriazyev (pen name)
- Occupations: Russian avant-garde painter, novelist, short story writer

Portrait of Boris Pasternak, 1921

Yury Pavlovich Annenkov (Russian: Юрий Павлович Анненков, also known as Georges Annenkov; 23 July [O.S. 11 July] 1889 – 12 July 1974), was a Russian avant-garde draughtsman and painter mostly known for his book illustrations and portraits. He also worked in theatre and cinema (design). Annenkov was a leading member of Mir Iskusstva.

In his essay "On Synthetism" (1922), Yevgeny Zamyatin writes that "[Annenkov] has a keen awareness of the extraordinary rush and dynamism of our epoch. His sense of time is developed to the hundredth of a second. He has the knack--characteristic of Synthetism--of giving only the synthetic essence of things."

Yury Annenkov was born into a well-known family (among his ancestors was Pavel Annenkov, Alexander Pushkin's publisher); his father, Pavel Annenkov was involved with revolutionary activities that led him to exile in Siberia. The Annenkovs moved back to St. Petersburg in 1892.

In 1908, Annenkov entered the University of St. Petersburg and attended Savely Seidenberg's studio classes, together with Marc Chagall. Next year, 1909, he attended Jan Ciągliński's studio. In 1911–1912, Annenkov moved to Paris to work in the studios of Maurice Denis and Félix Vallotton. In 1913, Annenkov worked in Switzerland. Upon his return to St. Petersburg in 1914, Annenkov mostly contributed to magazines (Satirikon, Teatr i Iskusstvo, Otechestvo) and worked for theatres.

Maxim Gorky's fairy-tale book, Samovar, published in 1917 was his first work as a book designer. His recognition as a book illustrator came in the wake of his most known work — designing Alexander Blok's poem, "The Twelve", published in 1918 and going through three printings within a year. In the next few years Annenkov designed numerous books for Petrograd authors (Mikhail Kuzmin and Aleksey Remizov, to name a few). In 1919 Annenkov designed and staged "First Distiller, or How an Imp Earned a Hunk of Bread", a comedy by Count Lev Tolstoi.

Commissioned by the Bolshevik government, Annenkov together with Mstislav Dobuzhinsky, S. Maslovski and A. Kugel, designed and staged the open-air mystery "Liberated Labour Anthem" on 1 May 1920 in Petrograd. Later that year, Annenkov staged and designed another mass show, The Storming of the Winter Palace, part of the October Revolution anniversary celebrations in Palace Square, Petrograd. In 1919-1920 Annenkov made a series of abstract sculptural assemblages and collages, influenced by the Dada movement.

1922 saw his book "Portraits". It contained 80 pictures of the key-figures of Russian art of the time (Gorki, Zamyatin, Remizov, Sologub, Blok, Akhmatova a.o.) made in 1906–1921. The book also included essays by Yevgeny Zamyatin and Mikhail Kuzmin. He joined the Mir Iskusstva.

Annenkov left the Soviet Union in July 1924, first living in Germany and later settling in Paris. He continued to work as an artist and served as a costume designer for motion pictures. He was co-nominated with Rosine Delamare for the Academy Award for Best Costume Design for their work in the film The Earrings of Madame de... (1953).

In 1934 he wrote a satyrical novel A Tale of Trivia (Повесть о пустяках) under a pen name B. Temiriasev. The novel takes place between the Russian Revolution and Russian Civil War.
