= Pavel Filonov =

Russian painter

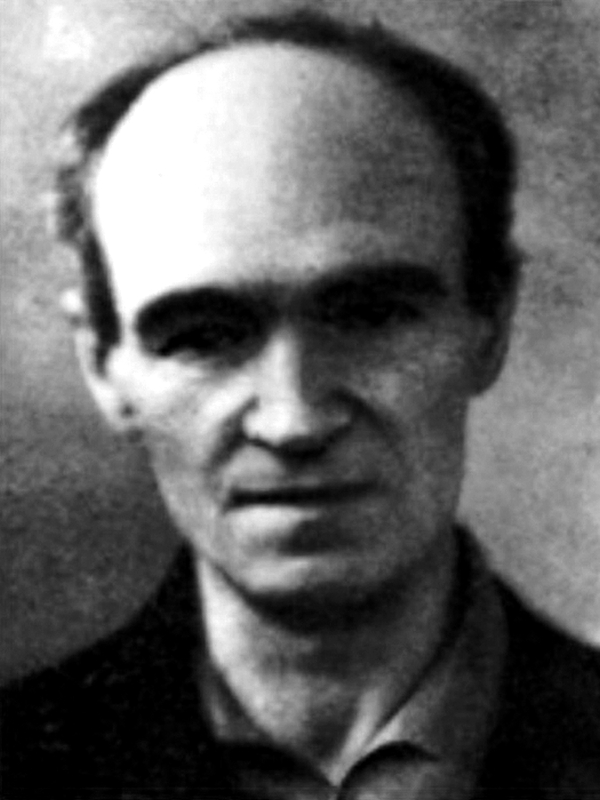
- 1938-1939
- Born: January 8, 1883; Moscow, Russia
- Died: December 3, 1941 (aged 58)
- Known for: Painting

Pavel Nikolayevich Filonov (Russian: Па́вел Никола́евич Фило́нов, IPA: [ˈpavʲɪl nʲɪkɐˈlajɪvʲɪtɕ fʲɪˈlonəf]; January 8, 1883 – December 3, 1941) was a Russian avant-garde painter, art theorist, and poet.

== Biography ==
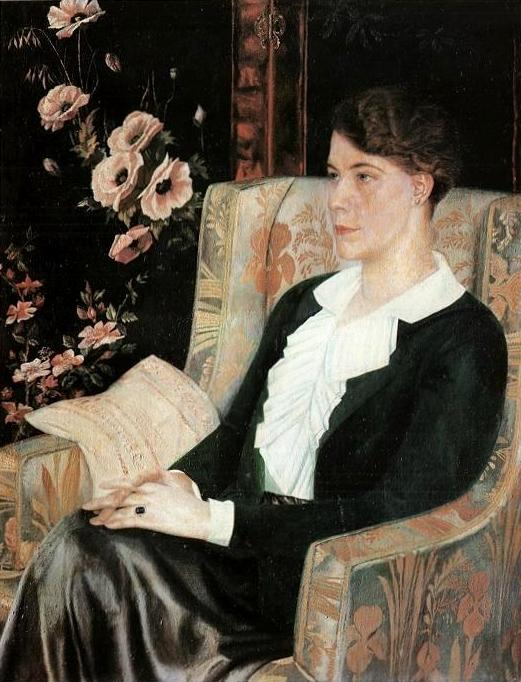
Portrait of E. N. Glebova (the artist's sister), 1915, oil on canvas. 117x152.5 cm. Russian Museum.

Filonov was born in Moscow on January 8, 1883 (Gregorian calendar) or December 27, 1882 (Julian calendar). In 1897, he moved to St. Petersburg, where he began taking art lessons. In 1908, he entered St. Petersburg Academy of Arts but was expelled in 1910.

Between 1910 and 1914, Filonov was a member of the art group Soyuz Molodyozhi ("Union of Youth"), founded by artists Elena Guro and Mikhail Matyushin. In 1912, he wrote The Canon and the Law, an article in which he articulated the principles of analytical realism, also known as "anti-Cubism". According to Filonov, while Cubism represents objects using elements of surface geometry, analytical realism seeks to represent objects through the elements of their inner essence or soul. He remained committed to these principles throughout his life.

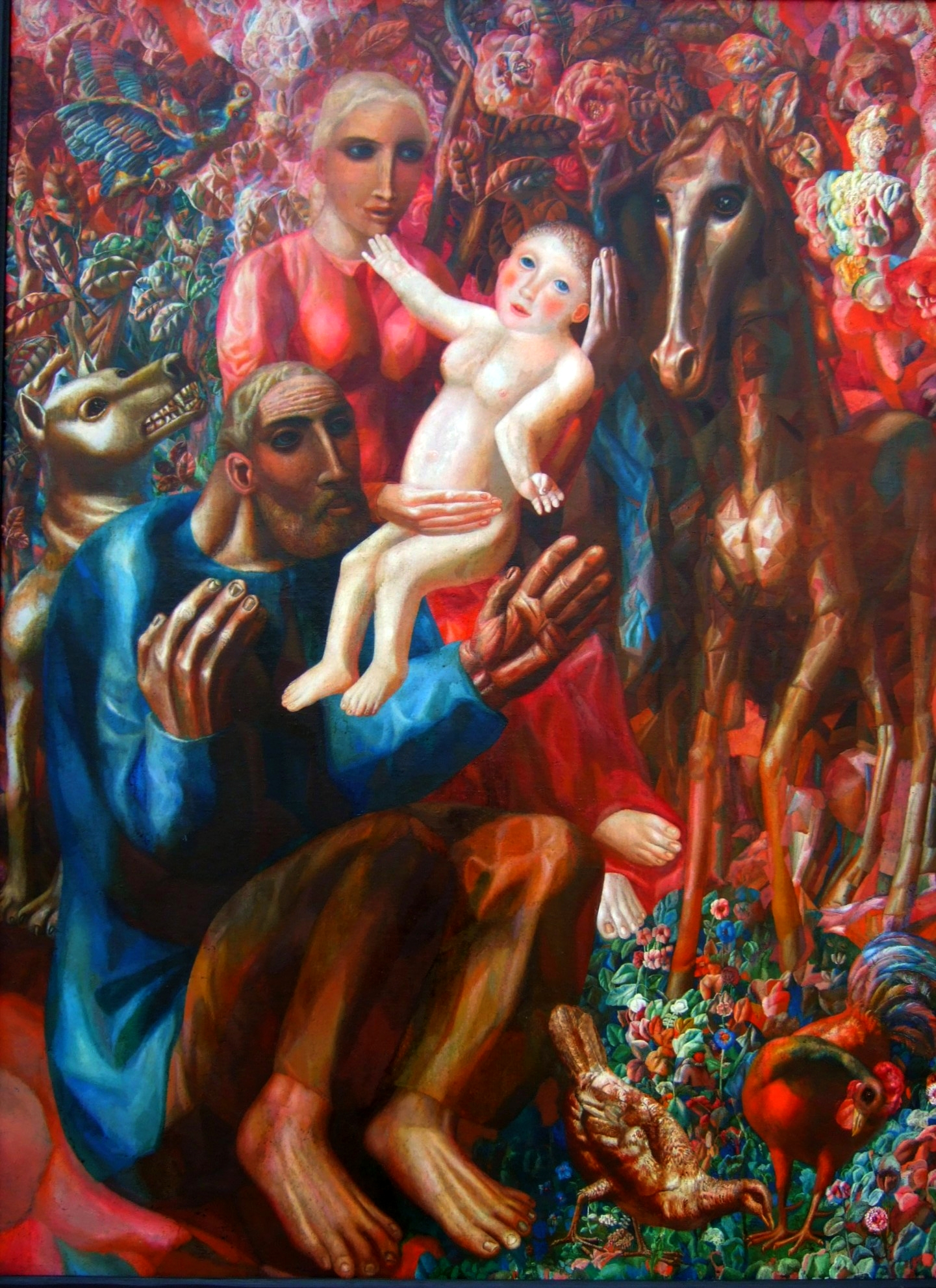
A Peasant Family (The Holy Family), 1914, oil on canvas, 159x128 cm, Russian Museum.

During 1913–1915, he associated closely with futurists such as Vladimir Mayakovsky, Velimir Khlebnikov, and others. He collaborated with Kazimir Malevich to illustrate Khlebnikov's Selected Poems with Postscript, 1907–1914. In the autumn of 1916, he enlisted to serve in World War I and was stationed on the Romanian front. Filonov later took an active role in the Russian Revolution of 1917, serving as Chairman of the Revolutionary War Committee in the Dunay region.

In 1919, he participated in the "First Free Exhibit of Artists of All Trends" at the Hermitage. By 1923, he had become a professor at the St. Petersburg Academy of Arts and a member of the Institute for Artistic Culture (INKhUK). There, he founded the Masters of Analytical Realism, a significant art school with over seventy members, including the American sculptor and painter Helen Hooker. The group's work had a lasting influence on movements such as suprematism and expressionism.

A major retrospective of Filonov's work was planned at the Russian Museum in 1929, but the Soviet government prohibited it. From 1932 onward, Filonov endured severe poverty, refusing to sell his works to private collectors. He wished to donate his entire collection to the Russian Museum to establish a Museum of Analytical Realism. He died of starvation on December 3, 1941, during the Siege of Leningrad.

== Method ==
Under the umbrella of Universal Flowering, Filonov developed a distinctive method of working that emphasized proceeding from the particular to the general. He believed that objects and compositions should be constructed from small details and fragments, considering any attempt to work in the opposite direction as nothing short of "charlatanism." To adhere to this philosophy, he used - and required his students to use - very small brushes for painting and the finest points for drawing.

== Legacy ==
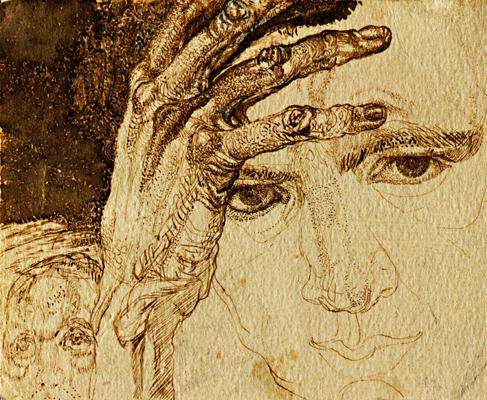
Self portrait, 1921

Most of Filonov's works were preserved by his sister, Yevdokiya Nikolayevna Glebova. She stored his paintings in the archives of the Russian Museum and eventually donated them as a gift. For many years, exhibitions of Filonov's work were prohibited. A breakthrough occurred in 1967 when a display of his works was allowed in Novosibirsk. Later, in 1988, his art was officially exhibited at the Russian Museum, followed by the first international exhibitions in Paris in 1989 and 1990.

During the years when Filonov's works had a semi-legal status, theft might have seemed easy. However, a legend persisted that Filonov's ghost protected his art. According to the tale, anyone who attempted to steal or smuggle his paintings abroad would suffer misfortune, such as death, paralysis, or similar calamities.

== Selected works ==
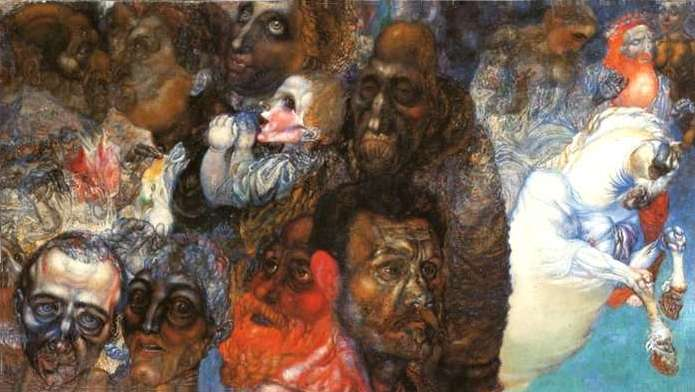
Heads (1910). Filonov considered this painting to be his first real work.

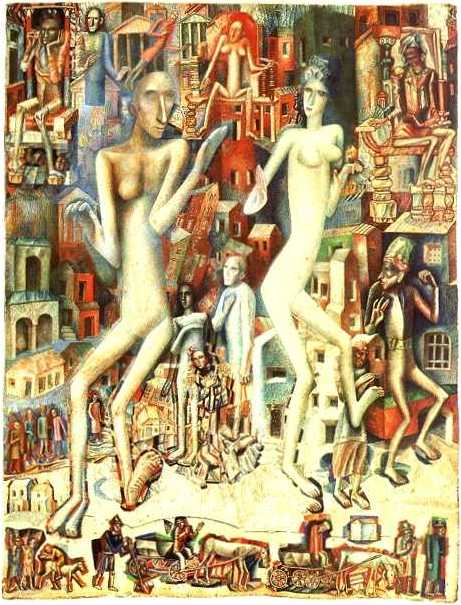
A Man and a Woman (Adam and Eve) (1912–1913).

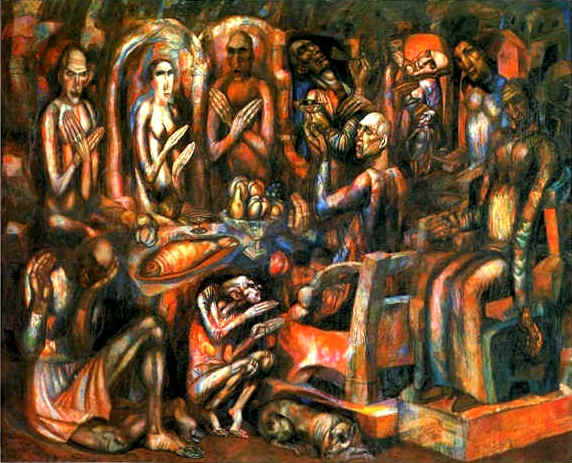
The Banquet of Kings (1913).

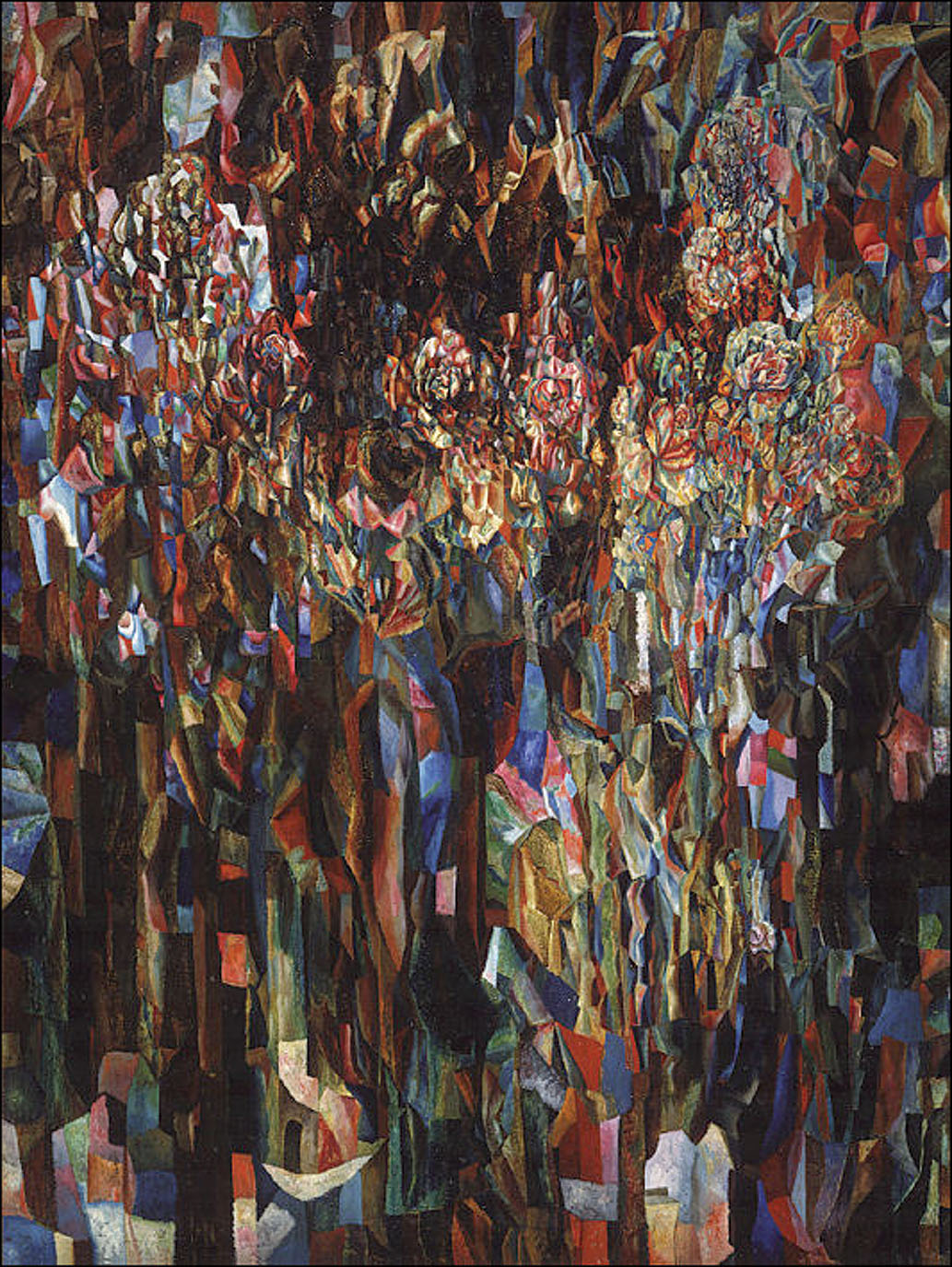
universal flowering (1915).

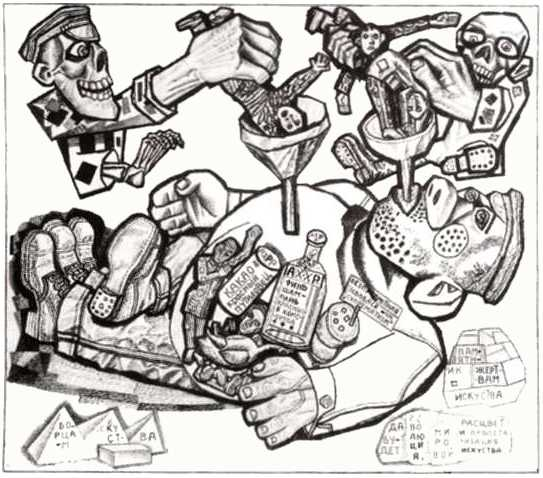
The Formula of Contemporary Pedagogy of IZO (1923).

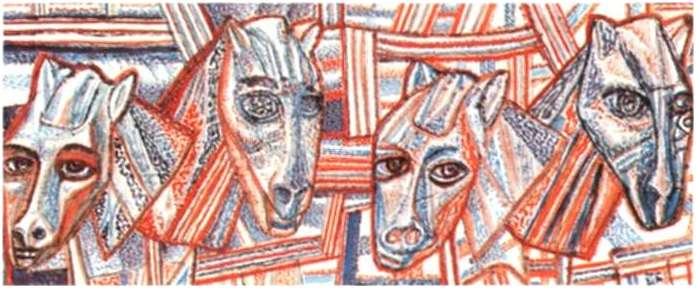
Horses (1924–1925).

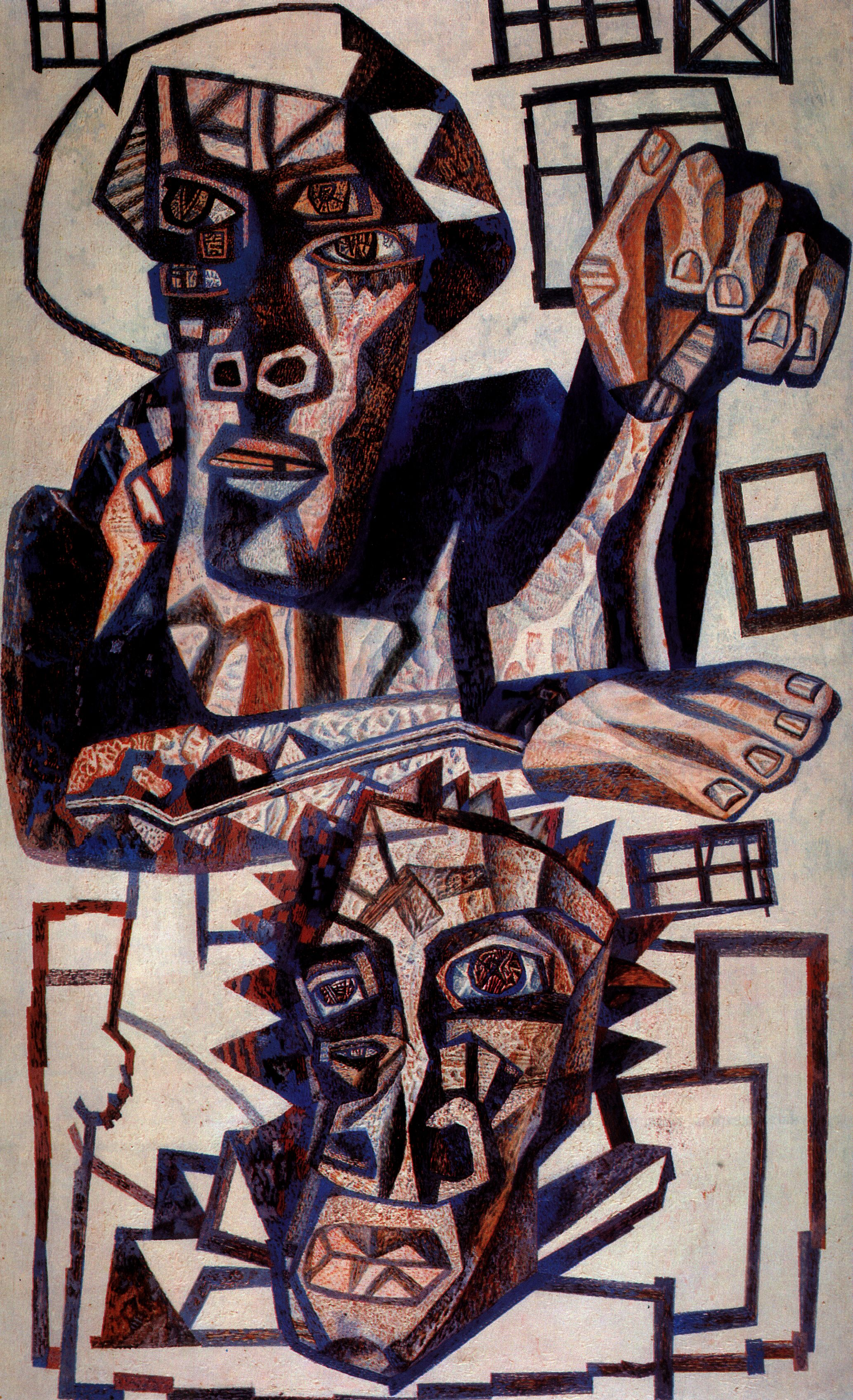
Two Heads. Rabbles (1925).

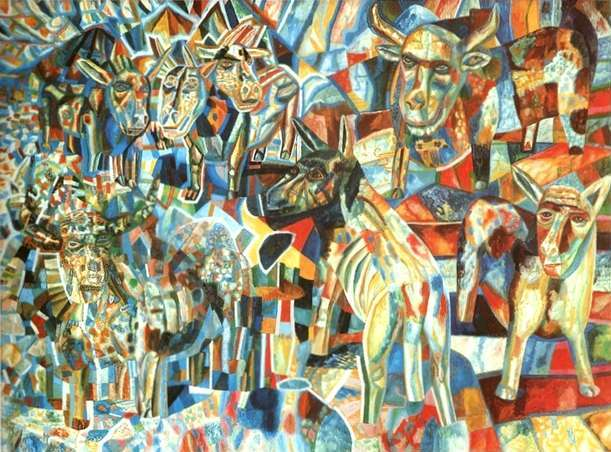
Animals (1930).

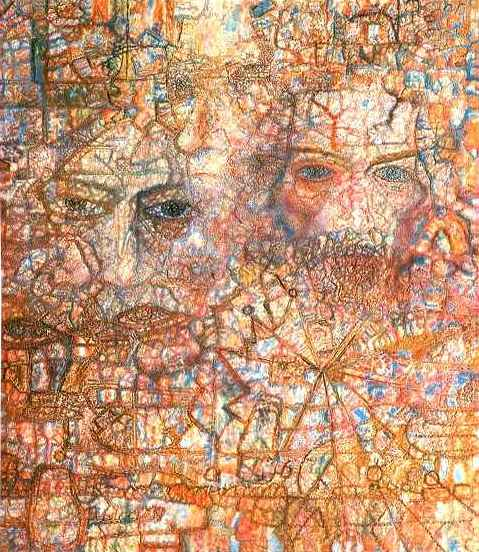
Countenances (Faces on an Icon) (1940)

== See also ==
- Fine Art of Leningrad
