= Mikhail Matyushin =

Russian painter

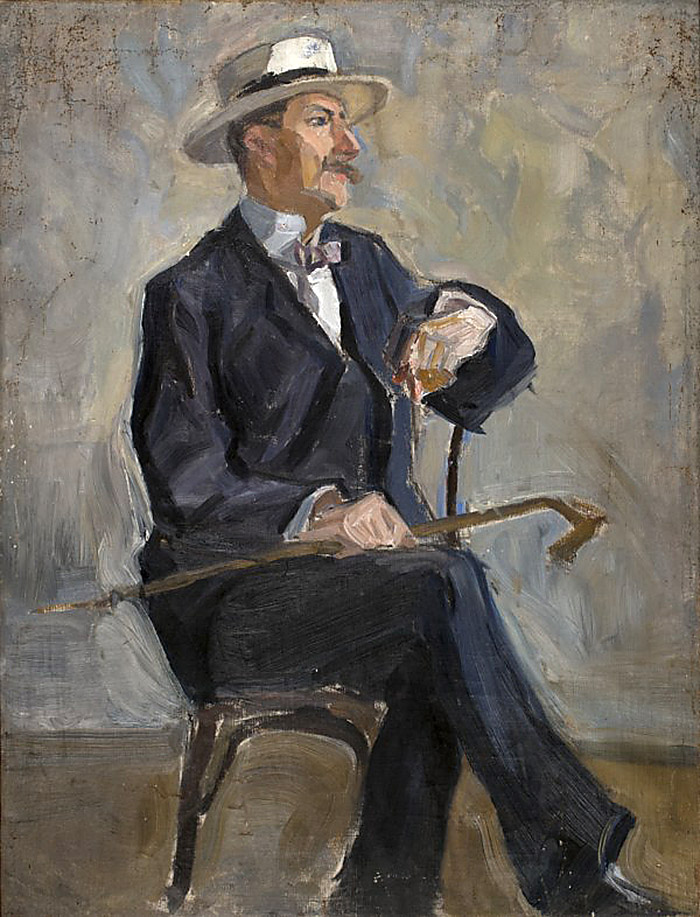
Portrait by Elena Guro, c1900

Michael Vasilyevich Matyushin (Russian: Михаил Васильевич Матюшин; 1861 in Nizhny Novgorod – 14 October 1934 in Leningrad) was a Russian painter and composer, leading member of the Russian avant-garde.

In 1910–1913 Matyushin and his wife Elena Guro (1877–1913) were key members of the Union of the Youth, an association of Russian Futurists. Matyushin, a professional musician and amateur painter, studied physiology of human senses and developed his own concept of the fourth dimension connecting visual and musical arts, a theory that he put to practice in the classrooms of Leningrad Workshop of Vkhutein and INHUK (1918–1934) and summarized in his 1932 Reference of Colour (Cправочник по цвету). Matyushin conducted experiments at his Visiology Center (Zorved) to demonstrate that expanding visual sensitivity from retinian optical centers would enable the discovery of "new organic substance and rhythm in the apprehension of space." He tried to teach himself and his students to see with both eyes, each independently, and to widen the field of their vision. He describes some of his work and ideas in a long essay titled "An Artist's Experience of the New Space."

== Biography ==
=== Early career ===
Matyushin was the illegitimate son of a landlord and a serf woman. According to his own memoirs, at an early age he studied reading, writing and playing violin himself; at the age of eight he was admitted to the music classes of Nizhny Novgorod Concervatory and in 1875 to Moscow Conservatory. Matyushin was also inclined to painting, but could not afford college training at the time. After graduation in 1881 Matyushin joined the Court Orchestra in Saint Petersburg and played with it professionally until 1913. He received formal training in graphic arts with an independent school in Saint Petersburg in the 1890s.

=== Cubo-Futurism ===
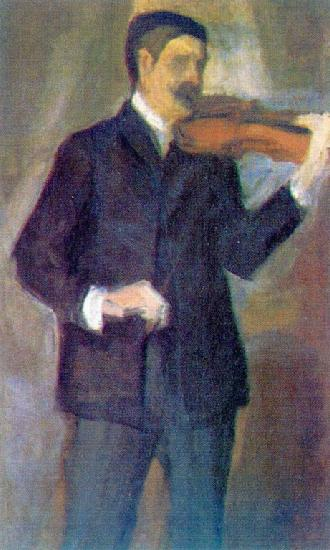
Portrait by Elena Guro, 1910

Matyushin met his second wife, writer and painter Elena Guro, at Ian Tsonglinski art school where both trained in 1903–1905. Guro, sixteen years his younger, dramatically changed Matyushin's view of art and society and the two became a seed for the Russian Cubo-Futurist movement evolving parallel to Italian Futurism. Matyushin was the oldest person among the futurists, and Alexander Blok sarcastically wrote that Matyushin "futuristically seeks to look younger". In 1910 Matyushin and Guro sponsored and co-authored Trap for Judges (Садок судей), the first almanac by Russian Futurists. The couple did not have children, but in 1912 Guro, suffering from leukemia, invented "my unforgettable son", a literary mystification that persisted past her death and became a subject of her book Autumnal Dream (Осенний сон, 1912) set to music by Matyshin in 1921. She died in April 1913.

=== Victory Over The Sun ===
In the same 1913, the year that became annus mirabilis of Russian avant-garde, Union of the Youth produced two experimental theatre shows, Vladimir Mayakovsky: A Tragedy by Vladimir Mayakovsky and Victory Over The Sun, an opera by Velimir Khlebnikov, Aleksei Kruchenykh (libretto), Matyushin (music) and Kazimir Malevich (stage design). According to Matyushin, the "Sun of cheap appearances" of this opera was none other than everyday sense of reality that is not infallible anymore; even the Galilean basics of cosmogony can be changed by humans who one day will become capable of physically capturing the Sun. The opera has since become notable for starring the first appearance of Malevich's Black Square.

INHUK was closed and merged to State Institute of Visual Arts (GIII) in December 1925;

=== Art theories ===
In 1918 avant-garde artists took over the former Imperial Academy of Arts, renamed to Free Workshops (SVOMAS) where Matyushin led his own art class on Colour. In 1921 the state relaunched the academy and reinstalled neoclassical revivalists at its helm; despite public protests, Matyushin, Malevich and Vladimir Tatlin lost their chairs. Matyushin and Malevich retreated into the walls of Leningrad's Institute of Artistic Culture (INHUK) where Matyushin and his disciples continued experiments on colour and perception.

Matyushin, along with Malevich and Pavel Filonov, was a perceptual millenarianist, confident that the boundaries of individual human perception are yet unexplored and can be significantly extended in an almost mystic way. The movement began to fade at around 1915 and gave way to constructivist ideology in the early 1920s, but Matyushin, Malevich and Filonov remained faithful to millenarianism through 1920s.

Another problem handled by Matyushin was the human inability to see all 360 degrees. In 1923 Matyushin wrote that the solution lies in the artist's personal development to the point where he attains "a physiological change in the previous methode of perception" and introduced the concept of a rear plane, a layer of rearward information previously "outside the human sphere due to inadequacies of experience". Matyushin formed a new study group, Zorved (Зорвед, literally see and know) and claimed that it discovered evidence of perception of events and object located behind the person, and that humans possess visual centers capable of resolving this rearward "vision".

== Legacy ==
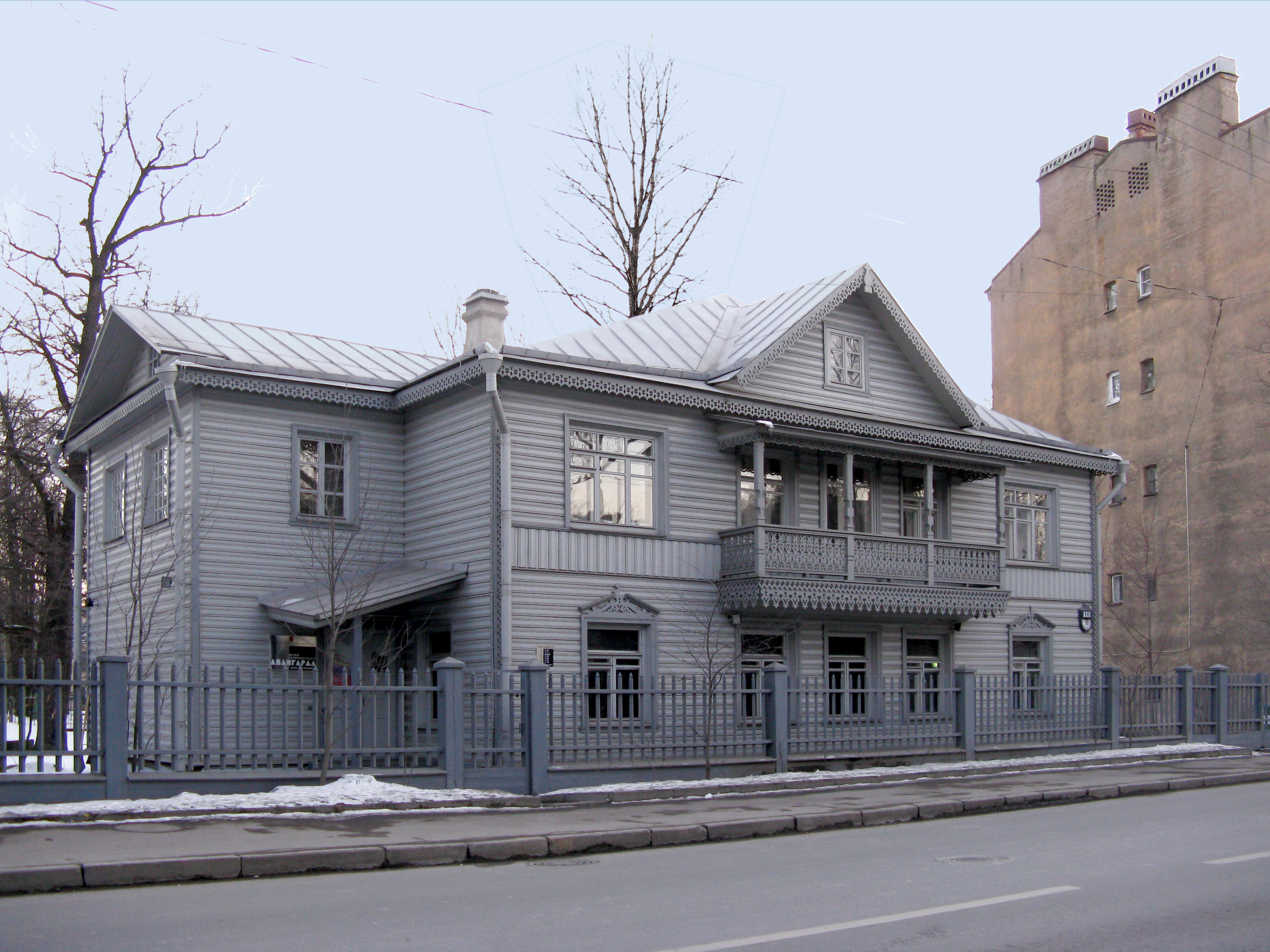
Matyushin House, 2009

The wooden house of Matyushin and Guro in Saint Petersburg (59.970912°N 30.312384°E) now houses the Museum of Avant-Garde in Saint Petersburg, a division of the State Museum of History of Saint Petersburg. The house, originally built in the 1840s or 1850s, became the property of the Literary Foundation (Литературный фонд) in 1904 and operated as an artists' hotel. Matyushin and Guro moved into flat 12 in 1912. The place also provided shelter for Malevich, Filonov, Mayakovsky and other notable artists of the Russian avant-garde and socialist realism.

Olga Konstantinovna, the third wife and widow of Matyushin, lived there until her death in 1975; during the Siege of Leningrad her room was taken over by Vsevolod Vishnevsky and a special order preserved the building from being pulled down for firewood. After 1979, when the last residents had moved out or died, Matyushin's house became a public museum. However, the present building is a contemporary replica: the original house was taken apart and rebuilt from new wood in 1987; after a fire in 1990 and many later setbacks it was rebuilt again and reopened in 2006.

== Gallery ==
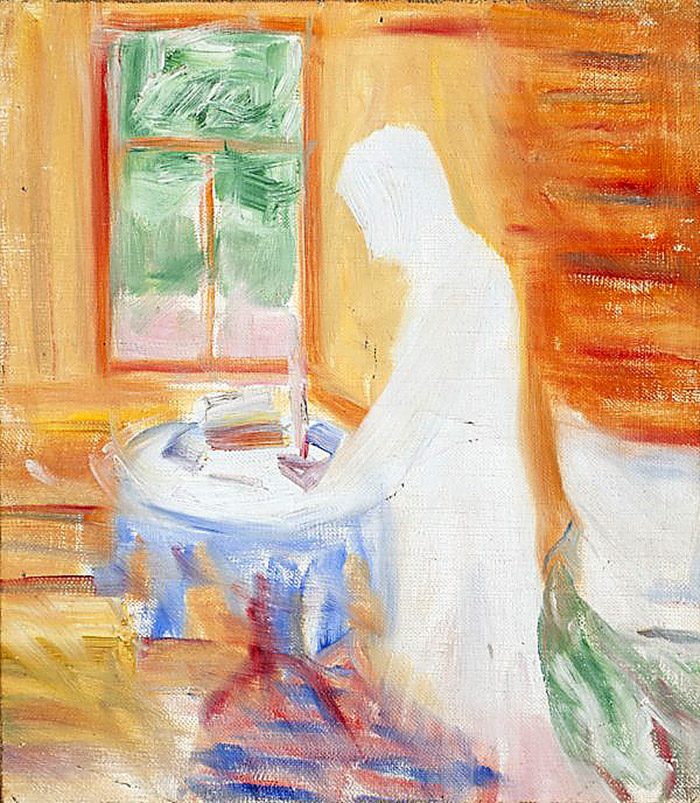
Son, c. 1910

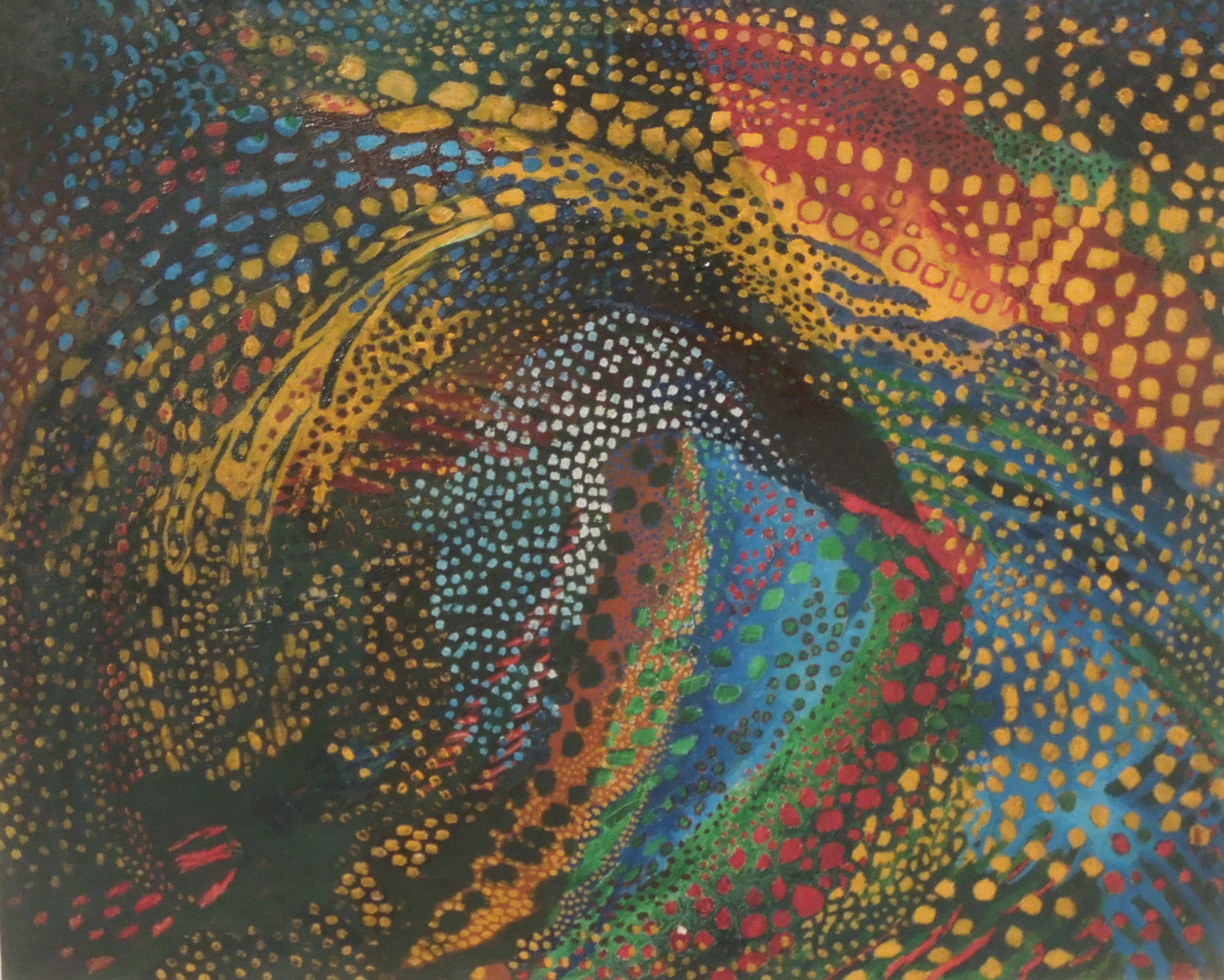
Painterly-Musical Composition, 1918

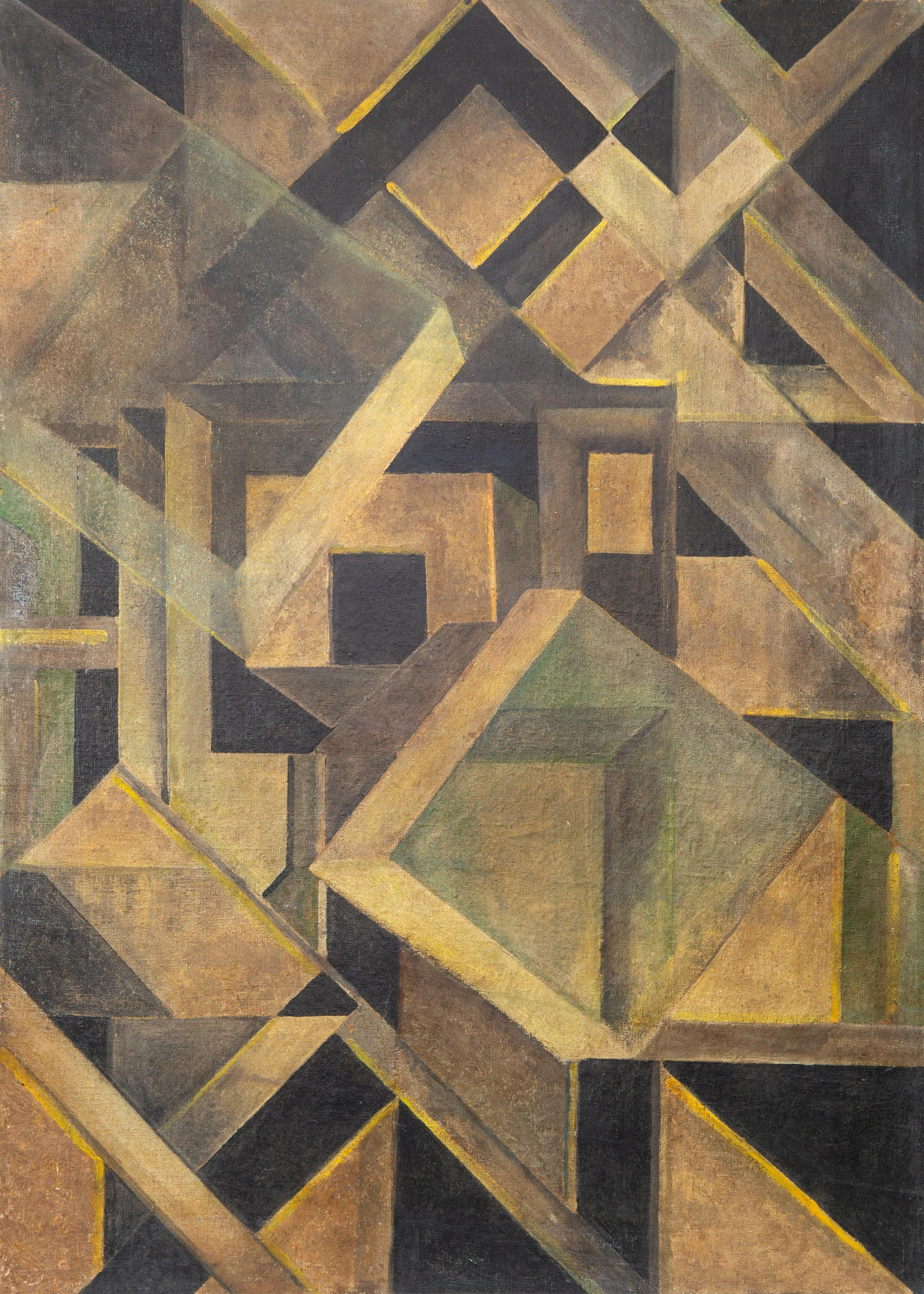
Absctract Composition with Crystalline Forms, 1920

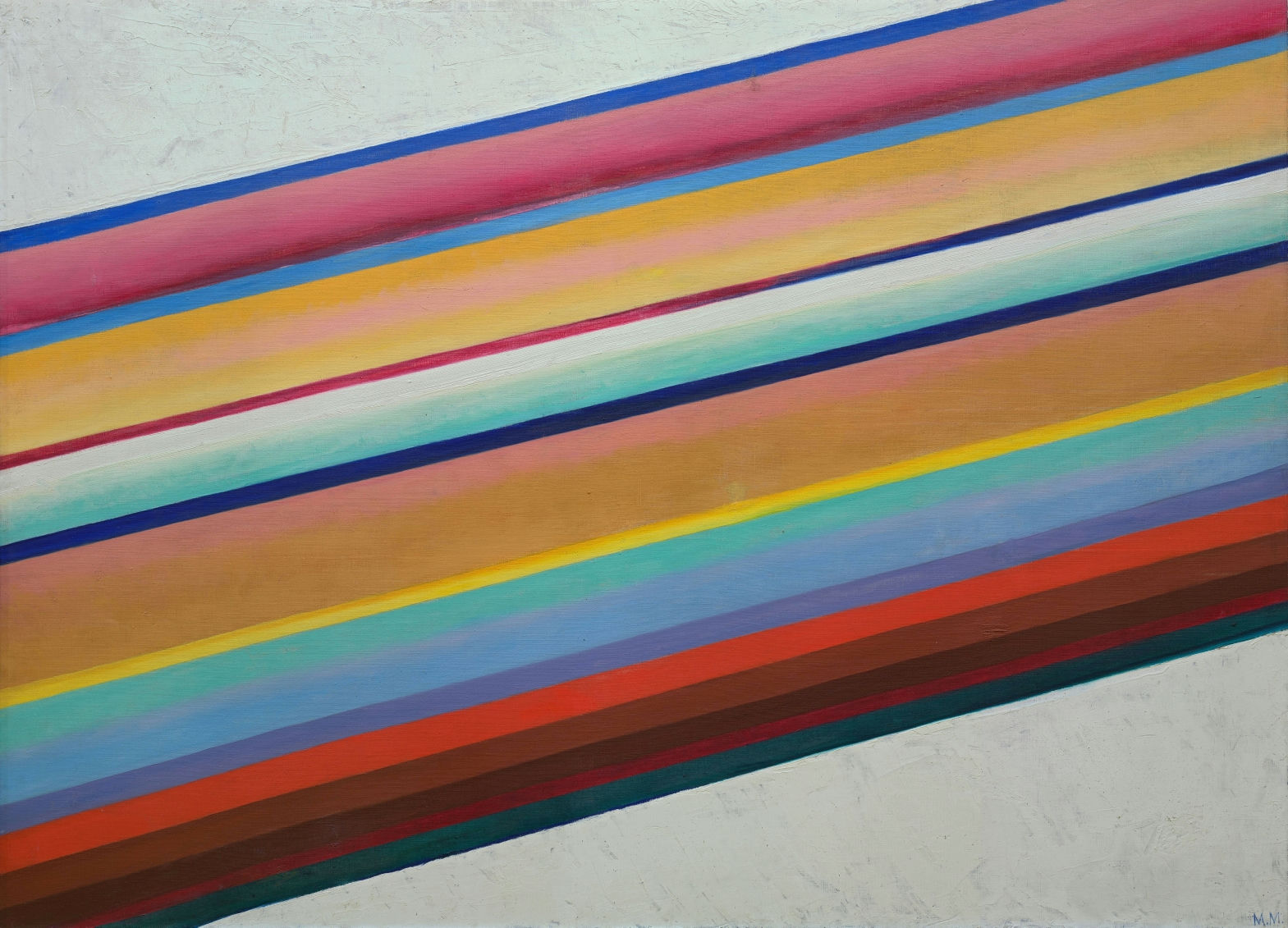
Movement in Space (c. 1923)

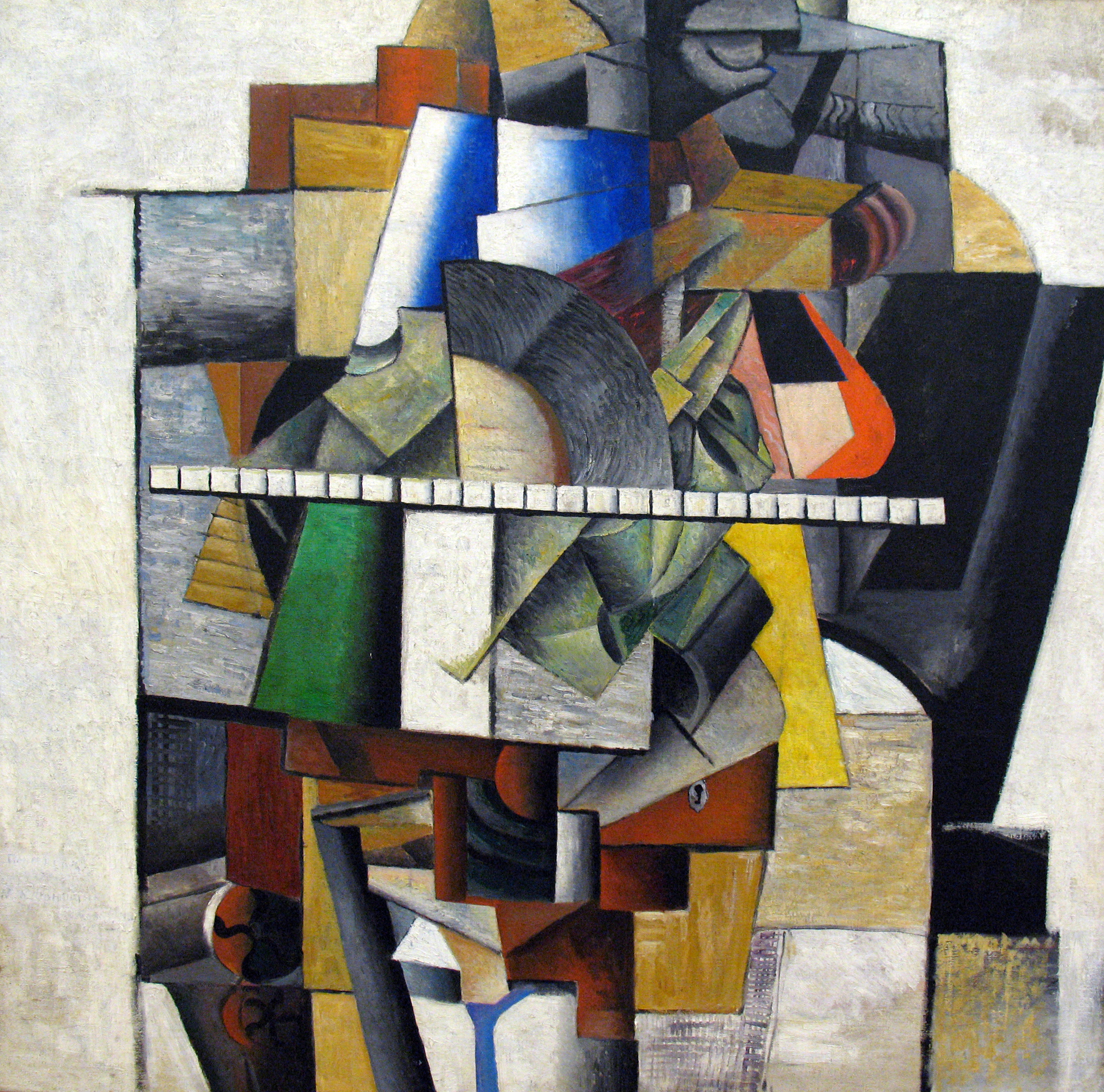
Kazimir Malevich, Portrait of Mikhail Matyushin, c. 1913

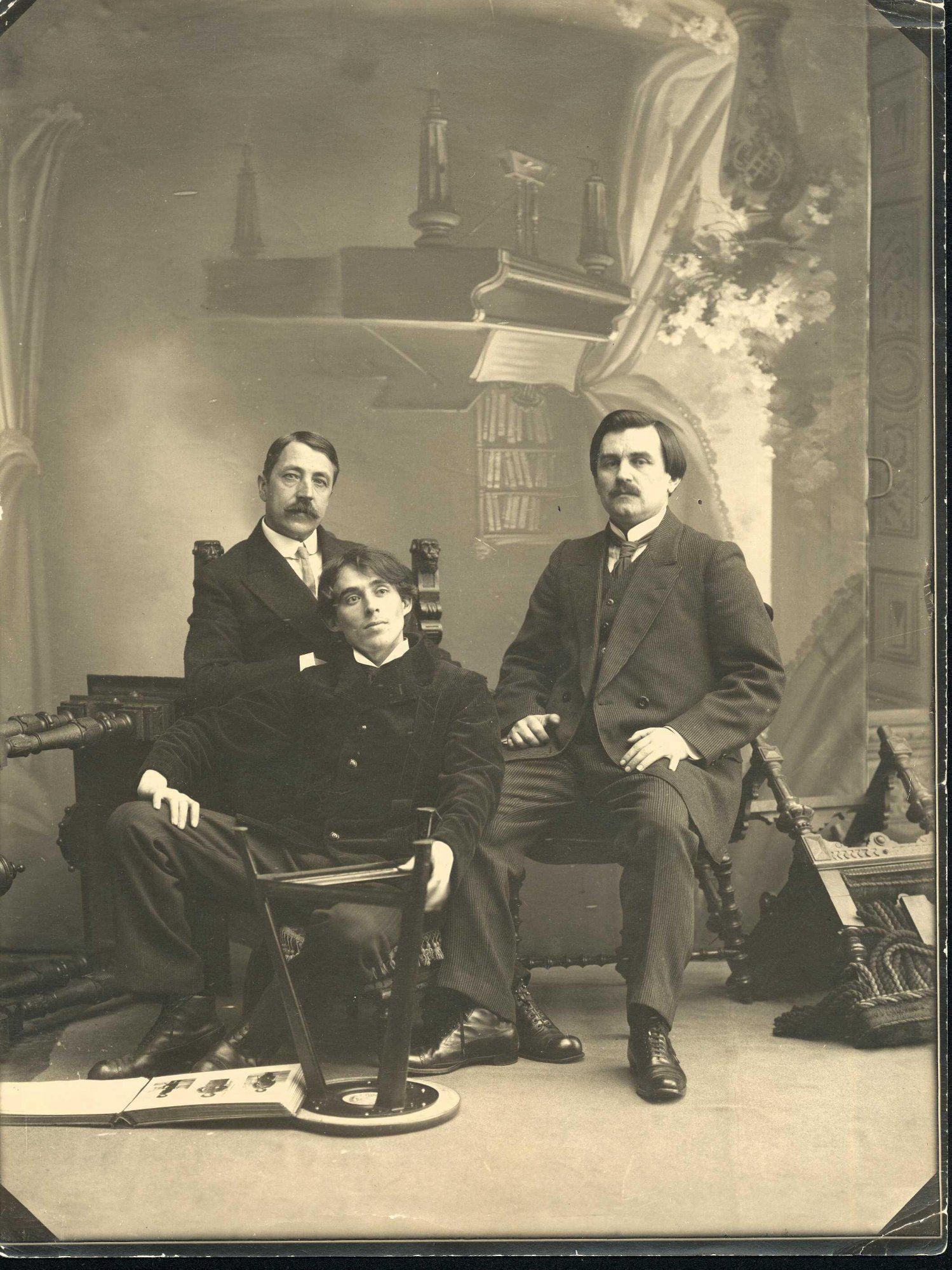
Matyushin, Alexei Kruchonykh, and Malevich at the First All-Russian Conference of the Bards of the Future, 1912. Photo by Karl Bulla.

== Sources ==
- Bartlett, Rosamund, et al. Victory over the Sun: The World’s First Futurist Opera. University of Exeter Press, 2012.

- Tillberg, Margareta, “Be a Spectator with a Large Ear”: Victory over the Sun as Public Laboratory Experiment for Mikhail Matiushin's Theories of Colour Vision".

- Clark, Katerina (1998). Petersburg, crucible of cultural revolution. Harvard University Press. ISBN 978-0-674-66336-7.
- Cooke, Raymonde (1987). Velimir Khlebnikov: a critical study. Cambridge University Press. ISBN 978-0-521-32670-4.
- Everdell, William (1997). The first moderns: profiles in the origins of twentieth-century thought. University of Chicago Press. ISBN 978-0-226-22480-0.
- Howard, Jeremy (1992). The Union of Youth: an artists' society of the Russian avant-garde. Manchester University Press ND, 1992. ISBN 978-0-7190-3731-3.
- Leach, Robert (1994). Revolutionary theatre. Routledge. ISBN 978-0-415-03223-0.
- Grodberg, Kristi A., Elena Guro in: Ledkovskaya-Astman, Maria; et al. (1994). Dictionary of Russian women writers. Greenwood Publishing Group. ISBN 978-0-313-26265-4. pp. 238–242
- Matyushin, Mikhail (2007). Михаил Матюшин. Профессор академии художеств (Mikhail Matyushin: Professor of Academy of Arts) (in Russian and English). NT Print, Moscow. ISBN 978-5-901751-70-1.
- Perloff, Marjorie (2003). The futurist moment: avant-garde, avant guerre, and the language of rupture. University of Chicago Press. ISBN 978-0-226-65738-7.
- Roberts, Graham (2006). The Last Soviet Avant-Garde: OBERIU - Fact, Fiction, Metafiction. Cambridge University Press. ISBN 978-0-521-02834-9.
- Smith, Bernard (1998). Modernism's history: a study in twentieth-century art and ideas. UNSW Press. ISBN 978-0-86840-744-9.
- Volkov, Solomon (1995). St. Petersburg: a cultural history. Free Press. ISBN 978-0-02-874052-2.
