= Remezov =

Remezov (Russian: Ремезов) is a Russian masculine surname, its feminine counterpart is Remezova. It may refer to:

- Gennadi Remezov (born 1965), Russian professional footballer.
- Semyon Remezov (ca. 1642 – after 1720), Russian historian, architect and geographer of Siberia
  - Remezov Chronicle
