= Elena Guro =

Russian writer, illustrator and futurist (1877–1913)

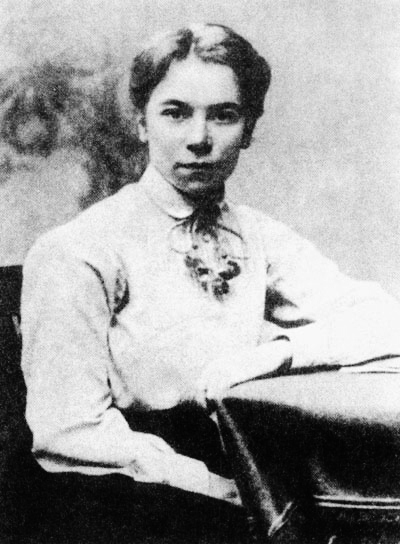
- Elena Guro c. 1900
- Born: Elena Genrikhovna Guro; January 10, 1877; Saint Petersburg, Imperial Russia
- Died: May 6, 1913 (aged 36); Uusikirkko, Grand Duchy of Finland, Russian Empire
- Known for: The Hurdy-Gurdy; Autumnal Dream; Finland
- Movement: Futurism, Cubo-Futurism
- Spouse: Mikhail Matyushin (m. 1906)

Elena Genrikhovna Matyushina (Russian: Еле́на Ге́нриховна Матю́шина, IPA: [jɪˈlʲɛnə ˈɡʲɛnrʲɪxəvnə mɐˈtʲuʂɨnə]; née Guro [Russian: Гуро́, IPA: [ɡʊˈro] ]; January 10, 1877 – May 6, 1913) was a Russian Futurist painter, playwright, poet, and fiction writer. Her career spanned the transitional period between Russian Symbolism and Futurism.

Guro is noted for developing new theories of color in painting. She was also the only female member of the most influential Futurist group called Cubo-Futurism.

== Early life ==
Guro was born in St. Petersburg on January 10, 1877. Her father was Genrikh Stepanovich Guro (or Gouraud), an officer in the Imperial Russian Army of French descent. Her mother Anna Mikhailovna Chistyakova was a talented amateur artist. Guro spent her childhood in the village of Novosely near Pskov and at her father's estate in Luga. She inherited a government pension and property in Finland from her father, using both to support her artistic career. Her sister, Ekaterina Guro, was also a writer.

== Career ==
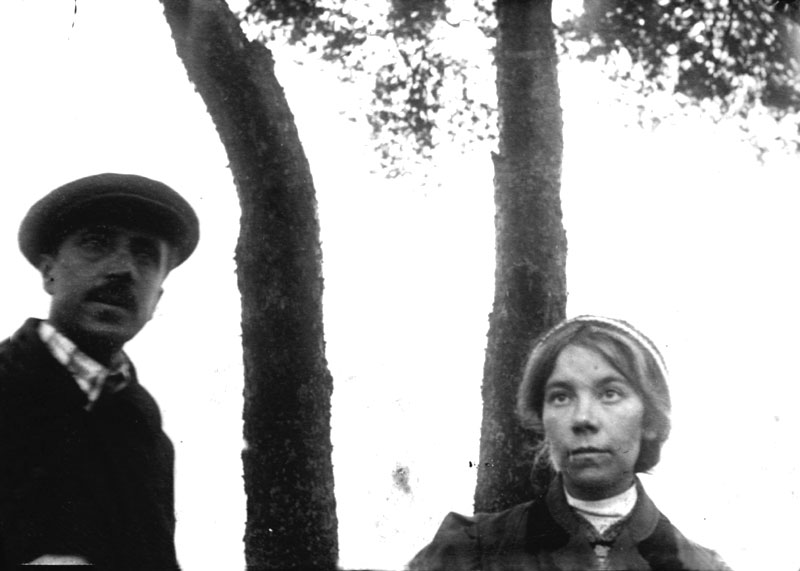
Guro and Matyushin.

From 1890 to 1893 she studied art at the Society for the Encouragement of the Arts in St Petersburg. From 1903 to 1905 she studied in the private studio of Jan Ciągliński where she met her future husband Mikhail Matyushin (they were married in 1906). The year 1905 marked her literary debut with the publication of Early Spring (Rannjaja vesna). This was her first short story and was published in an anthology of contemporary Russian writers called Sbornik molodyx pisatelej. One year previously, in 1904, she illustrated the Russian translation of a book of fairy tales by the French writer George Sand. In 1906 she and Matyushin moved to the art school of Elizaveta Zvantseva, where Guro worked under Mstislav Dobuzhinsky, Léon Bakst and Kuzma Petrov-Vodkin. In 1908 she left the school and established her own studio. By 1908 her home was an important meeting place for discussions on art and literature.

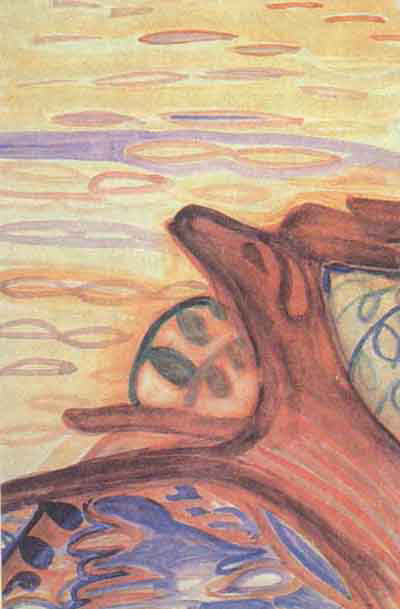
Little Deer by Guro, 1908/09

Her first book of prose, poetry, and drama The Hurdy-Gurdy came out in 1909. In 1910 she contributed to the journal Trap for Judges, one of the first publications of the Russian Futurists. She also contributed to the second volume of Trap for Judges in 1913. Guro and her husband subsidized both issues. In 1911 Guro's manuscript of a book of fairy tales she had been planning to publish was lost by her publisher, along with the illustrations she had done for it. Her second book Autumnal Dream was published in 1912.

Guro is well-known for her fascination with the contrast between the urban world and nature, once writing in a short story about the psychology of people based in cities. Her fascination appears to have begun with the way a city looks, for example its street lights and gilded windows. It is said that Guro was the most "urbanist" of the early twentieth-century Russian poets for the "concreteness" of her representations of the Russian cityscape. Eventually, she became tired of the subject in about 1910, when the very theme was growing popular with her Cubo-Futurist colleagues. According to Matyushin, she would now stay in the countryside from Spring until Autumn.

In her paintings, Guro explored the rules of color. This interest, which began in 1911, became a defining feature of her works. She developed theories of color based on the Art Nouveau's basic principle of form creation and the Scandinavian folk art. Matyushin applied the theories she developed after her death.

== Last days ==
In 1913 she continued to write and paint, even though she was suffering from leukemia. She died the same year at her country house in then Uusikirkko, Finland. At the time of her death she had nearly completed a major work The Poor Knight. Several poems and two works of prose were published posthumously, in the collection The Three and in the journal Union of Youth, in 1913. Her third book The Little Camels of the Sky was published in 1914.

== Characteristics of art ==
Guro's work is characterised by the syncretism of painting, poetry and prose, an impressionistic perception of life, the poetics of the laconic lyrical fragment. Favourite themes include motherhood spreading throughout the world and a pantheistic sense of nature.

An interest in Guro was awakened by Vladimir Markov's work "Russian Futurism" (1968). In 1988, a collection of her was published in Stockholm and in 1995, unpublished works from her archives in Berkeley, California, were published. A large number of studies in Russia and abroad have been dedicated to Guro's creative work.

The archive of Guro archive is kept in Russian State Archive of Literature and Art (fund 134).

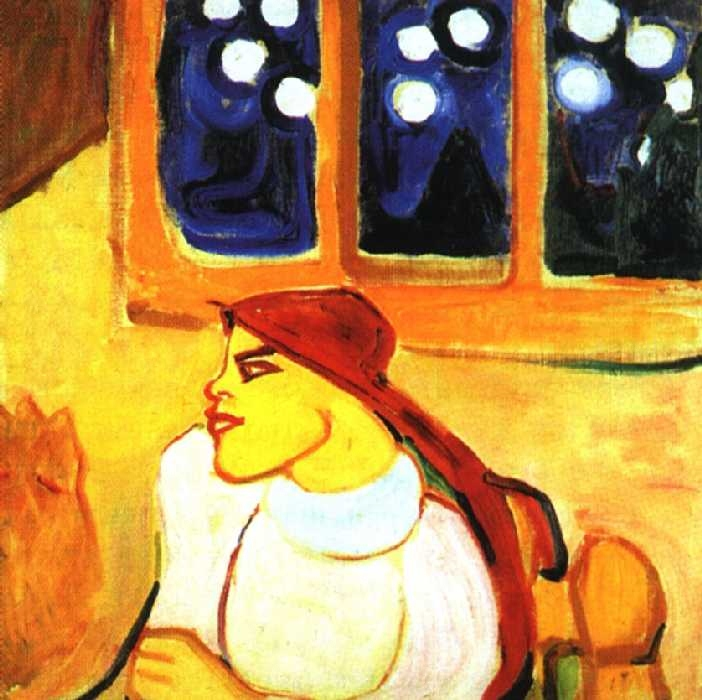
A Woman in a Headscarf by Guro, 1910

== Writings ==
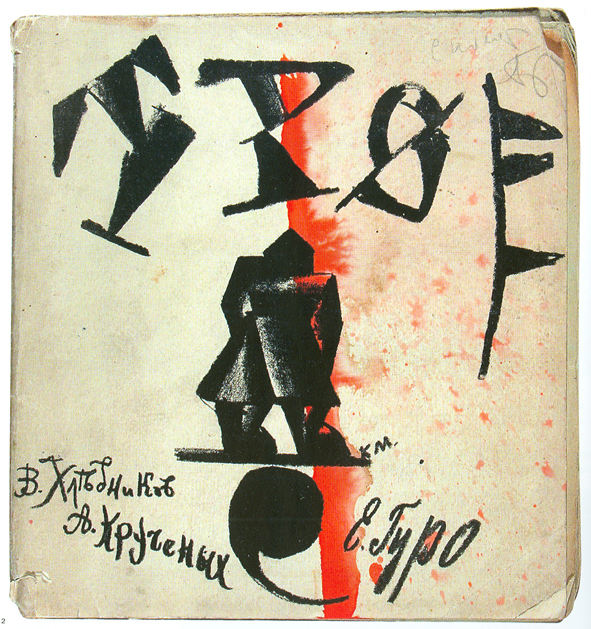
Kazimir Malevich's cover for The Three, containing Guro's most famous poem Finland

- The Hurdy-Gurdy (1909)
- Autumnal Dream (1912)
- The Poor Knight (1913)
- The Little Camels of the Sky (1914)
- The Three (1913) (posthumously); contains Guro's most famous poem Finland

== English translations ==
- The Little Camels of the Sky, from The Ardis Anthology of Russian Futurism, Ardis Publishers, 1983.
- Thus Life Passes, from 50 Writers: An Anthology of 20th Century Russian Short Stories, Academic Studies Press, 2011.
- Arlekin, the Beggar, in [sic] - a Journal of Literature, Culture, and Literary Translation, University of Zadar, 2020.
