= Igor Remizov =

Russian footballer

Personal information
- Full name: Igor Nikolayevich Remizov
- Date of birth: 21 October 1970 (age 56)
- Place of birth: Moscow, Russian SFSR
- Height: 1.70 m (5 ft 7 in)
- Positions: Defender; midfielder

Youth career
- EShVSM Moscow

Senior career*
Years	Team	Apps	(Gls)
1987–1988	EShVSM Moscow	3	(0)
1989	FC Lokomotiv Moscow	0	(0)
1989–1991	FC Zvezda Moscow	67	(4)
1992	FC Dynamo-Gazovik Tyumen	19	(0)
1993	FC Kuzbass Kemerovo	24	(1)
1995	FC Kuzbass Kemerovo	6	(1)
1998	FC Mezhdurechensk	2	(0)
- * Club domestic league appearances and goals

Igor Nikolayevich Remizov (Russian: Игорь Николаевич Ремизов; born 21 October 1970) is a former Russian football player.
