= List of Russian linguists and philologists =

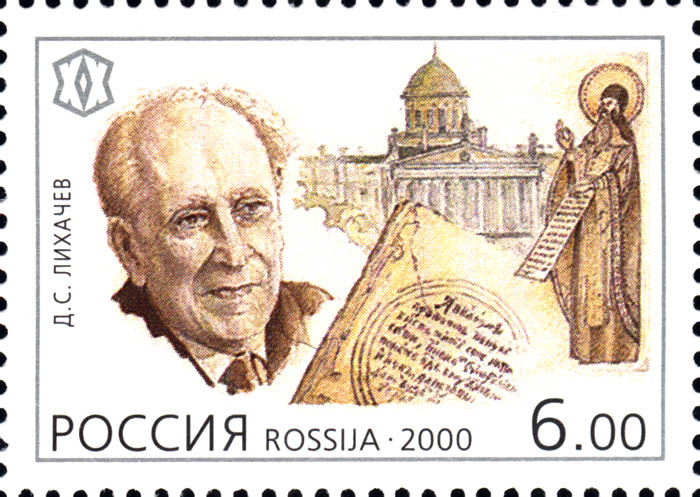
Philologist Dmitry Likhachyov with a text in Old East Slavic on the background of the Russian Literature Institute (Russian postage stamp).

This list of Russian linguists and philologists includes notable linguists from the Russian Federation, the Soviet Union, the Russian Empire and other predecessor states of Russia.

== A ==
- Vasily Abaev, prominent researcher of Iranian languages
- Solomon Adlivankin, Soviet linguist, the founder of Perm derivatology school, took part in compiling Akchim dialect dictionary
- Vladimir Admoni, linguist, literary critic, translator and poet, worked on the theory of grammar, historic and modern German syntax, defended Joseph Brodsky in court in 1964
- Alexander Afanasyev, leading Russian folklorist, recorded and published over 600 Russian fairy tales, by far the largest folktale collection by any one man in the world
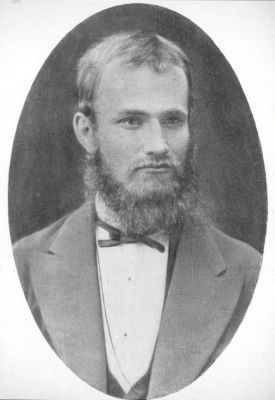
  Baudouin de Courtenay

== B ==
- Ivan Baudouin de Courtenay, co-inventor of the concept of phoneme and the systematic treatment of alternations, pioneer of synchronic analysis and mathematical linguistics
- Victor Bayda, linguist specializing in Celtic and Germanic languages
- Alexander Belskiy, Soviet specialist in literary criticism, famous Anglicist, founder of philological faculty at Perm State University, founder of Foreign literature Department at PSU
- Otto von Böhtlingk, prominent Indologist and Sanskrit grammarian
- Fyodor Buslaev, philologist and folklorist, representative of the Mythological school of comparative literature
- Yakov Brandt, Sinologist

== D ==
- Vladimir Dal, greatest Russian language lexicographer of the 19th century, folklorist and turkologist, author of the Explanatory Dictionary of the Live Great Russian language
- Vladimir Dybo, a main figure in the Moscow School of Comparative Linguistics

== E ==
- Tamara Erofeyeva, leader of school «Sociolinguistic study of urban language», head of Socio- and Psycholinguistics school at Department of General and Slavonic linguistics at Perm State National Research University, Honorary Figure of Russian Higher Education

=== F ===
- Elena Fedorova, scholar of antiquity; doctor of philology, specialising in classical philology and cultural history

== G ==
- Dmitry Gerasimov, medieval translator, diplomat and philologist, correspondent of European Renaissance scholars
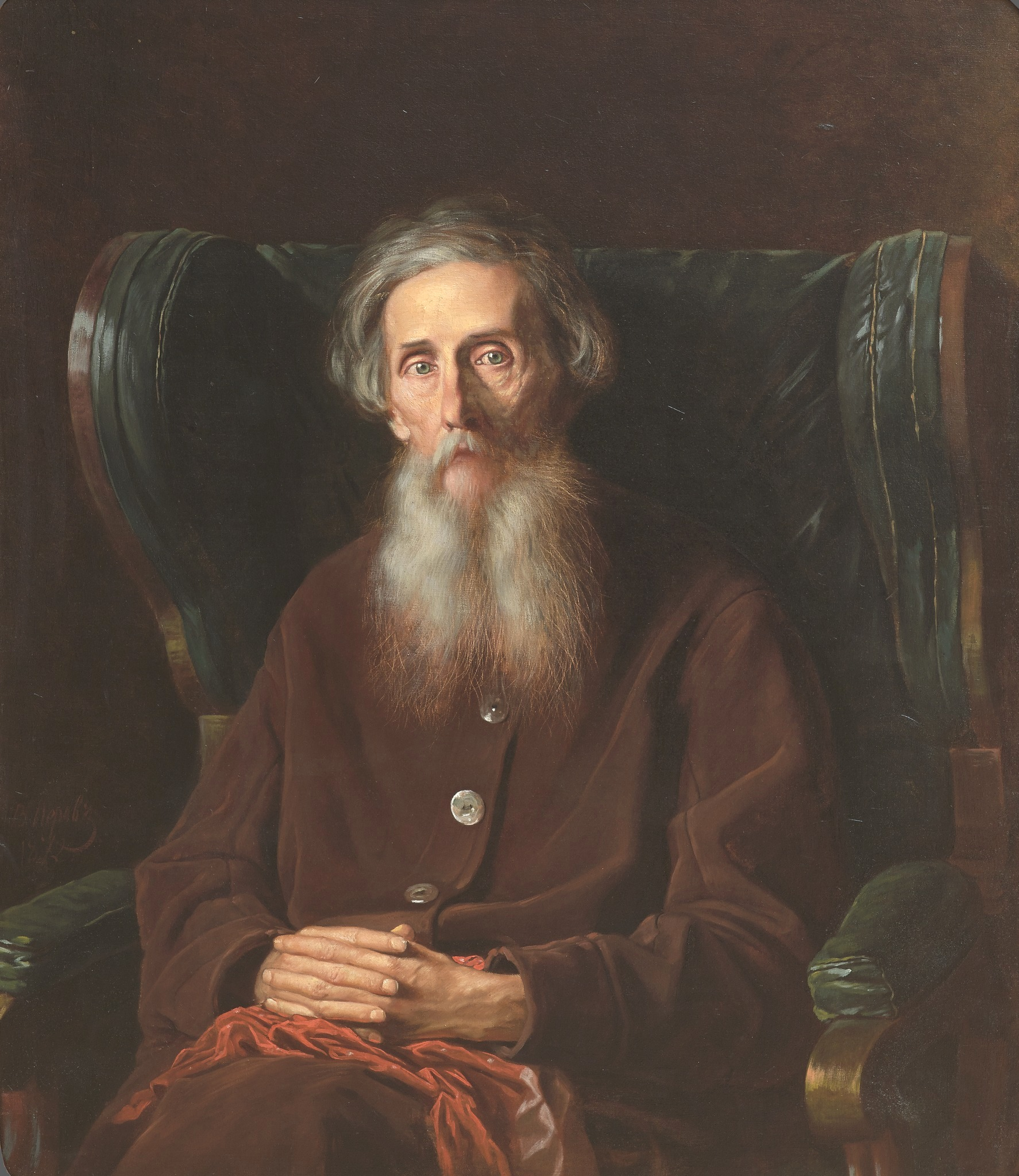
  Dal

== H ==
- Eugene Helimski, a long-range comparative linguist

== I ==
- Vladislav Illich-Svitych, founder of Nostratic linguistics and the Moscow School of Comparative Linguistics
- Vyacheslav Ivanov, founder of glottalic theory of Indo-European consonantism

== J ==
- Roman Jakobson, literary theorist and preeminent linguist of the 20th century, a founder of phonology, made numerous contributions to Slavic linguistics, author of Jackobson's Communication Model

== K ==
- Pyotr Kafarov, prominent sinologist, developed the cyrillization of Chinese, discovered and published many invaluable manuscripts, including The Secret History of the Mongols
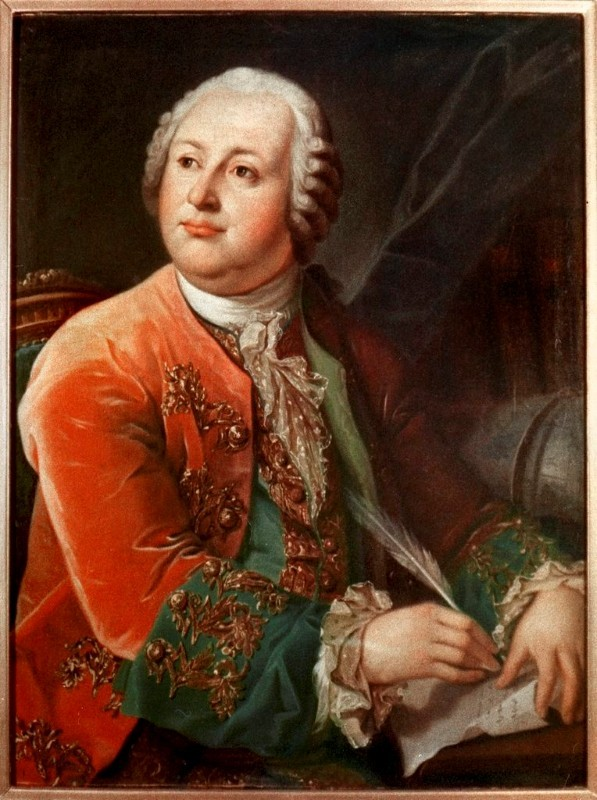
  Lomonosov
- Alexander Kibrik, eminent typologist and caucasologist
- Andrej Kibrik, specialist in linguistic typology, cognitive linguistics, discourse analysis, and Athabaskan languages
- Valeriya Kirpichenko, linguist, translator, specialist in Arabic literature, professor at the Institute of Oriental Studies of the Russian Academy of Sciences
- Yuri Knorozov, linguist, epigrapher and ethnographer, deciphered the ancient Maya script, proposed a decipherment for the Indus script
- Rimma Komina, Soviet and Russian specialist in literary criticism, the Dean of philological faculty at Perm State University (1977–1982)
- Andrey Korsakov, eminent linguist and language philosopher, specialised in the Germanic languages and English grammar, suggested philosophic reasoning for the parts of speech system and philosophic understanding of syntactic categories
- Margarita Kozhina, Soviet and Russian linguist, specialist in stylistics, the founder of Perm school of functional stylistics
- Nikolay Krushevsky, co-inventor of the concept of phoneme and the systematic treatment of alternations

== L ==
- Gerasim Lebedev, pioneer of Indology, introduced Bengali script typing to Europe, founded the first European-style drama theater in India
- Dmitry Likhachov, major 20th century expert on Old East Slavic language and literature
- Mikhail Lomonosov, polymath scientist and artist, wrote a grammar that reformed Russian literary language by combining Old Church Slavonic with vernacular tongue
- Nikolay Lvov, polymath artist and scientist, compiled the first significant collection of Russian folk songs, published epic bylinas
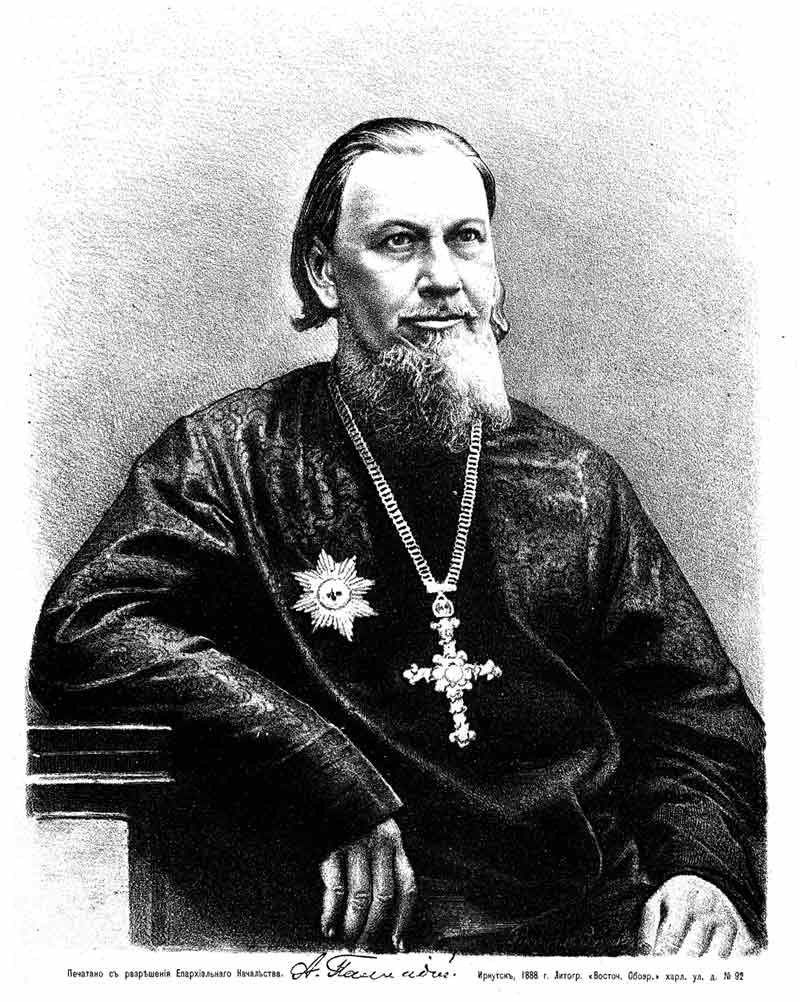
  Kafarov

== M ==
- Sergey Malov, turkologist, classified the Turkic alphabets, deciphered ancient Orkhon script
- Nicholas Marr, put forth a pseudo-linguistic Japhetic theory on the origin of language
- Igor Melchuk, structural linguist, author of Meaning-Text Theory
- Anatoly Moskvin, philologist and linguist, arrested in 2011 after the bodies of 26 mummified young women were discovered in his home.
- Leonid Murzin, Soviet and Russian linguist, the head of Perm derivatology school; he founded the Institute of dynamic linguistics
- Vladimir Müller, linguist and lexicographer, author of popular English–Russian dictionary

== N ==
- Sergei Nikolaev, a long-range comparative linguist
- Semyon Novgorodov, Yakut politician and linguist, creator of written Yakut language (Sakha scripts)

== O ==
- Sergei Ozhegov, author of the most widely used explanatory dictionary of Russian language

== P ==
- Ilia Peiros, a long-range comparative linguist known for his work on Austric languages
- Stephan of Perm, 14th century missionary, converted Komi Permyaks to Christianity and invented the Old Permic script
- Yevgeny Polivanov, linguist, orientalist and polyglot, developed the cyrillization of Japanese
- Nicholas Poppe, prominent Altaic languages researcher
- Vladimir Propp, formalist scholar, major researcher of folk tales and mythology
- Tatyana Proskuryakova, Mayanist scholarand archaeologist, deciphered the ancient Maya script

== R ==
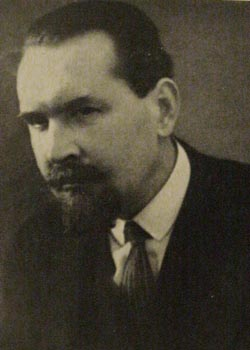
Trubetzkoy

- George de Roerich, major 20th century Tibetologist

== S ==
- Franz Anton Schiefner, prominent tibetologist, Finnic and Caucasus languages researcher
- Isaac Jacob Schmidt, first researcher of Mongolian
- Aleksey Shakhmatov, founder of textology, prepared major 20th century reforms of Russian orthography, pioneered the systematic research of Old Russian and medieval Russian literature
- Lev Shcherba, phonetist and phonologist, author of the glokaya kuzdra phrase
- Fyodor Shcherbatskoy, Indologist, initiated the scholarly study of Buddhist philosophy in the West
- Vitaly Shevoroshkin, a long-range comparative linguists
- Ivan Snegiryov, early collector of Russian proverbs and researcher of lubok prints
- Izmail Sreznevsky, leading 19th century Slavist, published Codex Zographensis, Codex Marianus and Kiev Fragments
- Georgiy Starostin, son of Sergei Starostin and long-range comparative linguistic researcher
- Sergei Starostin, prominent supporter of Altaic languages theory, proposed Dené–Caucasian languages macrofamily, reconstructed a number of Eurasian proto-languages

== T ==
- Vasily Tatischev, geographer, ethnographer and historian, compiled the first encyclopedic dictionary of Russian
- Chukchi Tenevil, reindeer herder who created a writing system for the Chukchi language
- Nikolai Trubetzkoy, principal developer of phonology and inventor of morphophonology, defined phoneme, a founder of the Prague School of structural linguistics

== U ==
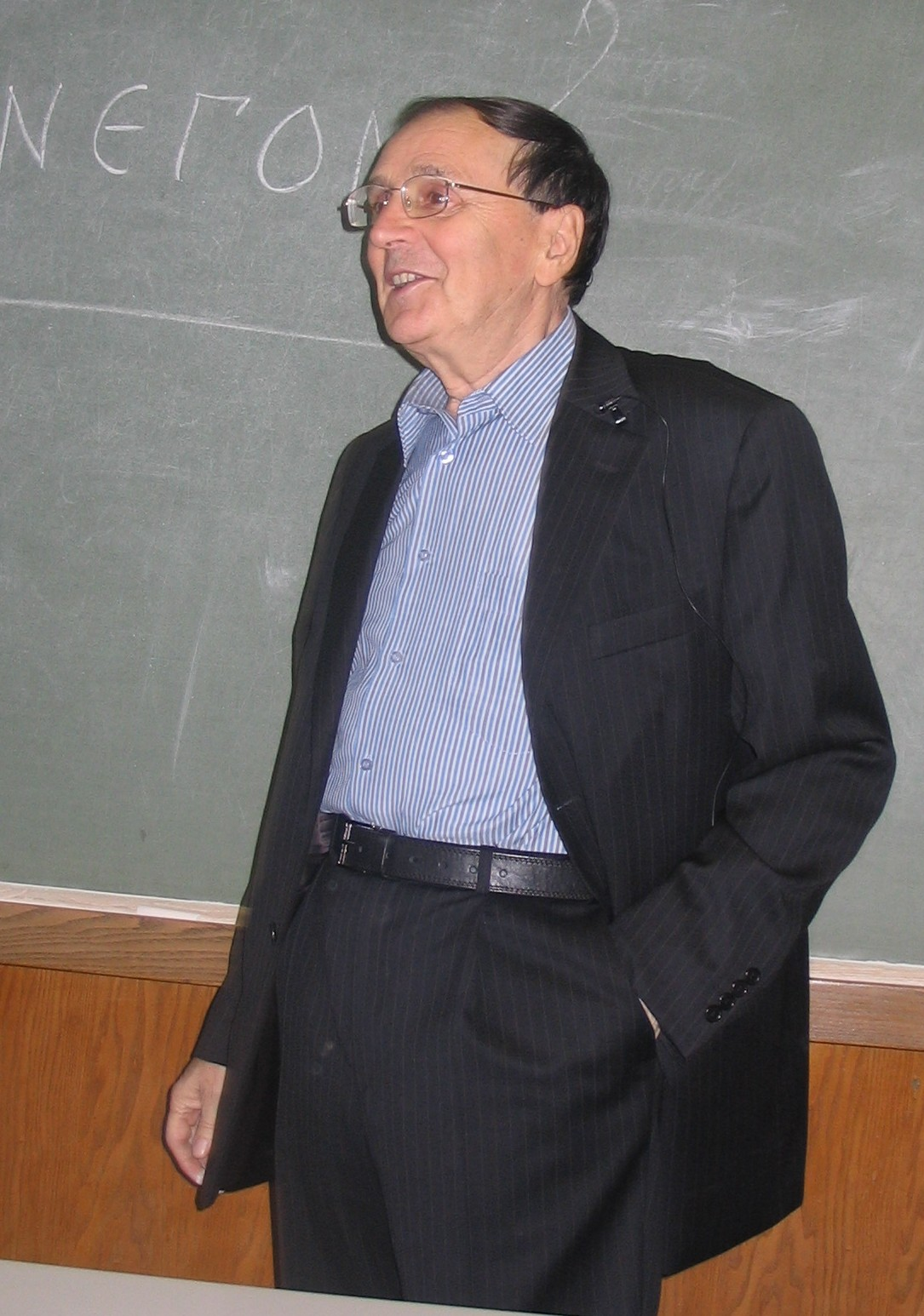
Zaliznyak

- Dmitry Ushakov, author of the academic Explanatory Dictionary of the Russian Language

== V ==
- Matrena Vakhrusheva, linguist and philologist, wrote the first Mansi-Russian dictionary and a pioneer in the development of Mansi literature and orthography for the Mansi language
- Max Vasmer, leading Indo-European, Finno-Ugric and Turkic etymologist, author of the 'Etymological Dictionary of the Russian Language
- Viktor Vinogradov, linguist and philologist, founder of the Russian Language Institute
- Alexander Vostokov, coined the term Old Church Slavonic, discovered Ostromir Gospel (the most ancient East Slavic book), pioneer researcher of the Russian grammar

== Z ==
- Andrey Zaliznyak, author of the comprehensive systematic description of Russian inflection, prominent researcher of the Old Novgorod dialect and birch bark documents, proved the authenticity of the Tale of Igor's Campaign
- L. L. Zamenhof, inventor of Esperanto, the most widely spoken constructed international auxiliary language
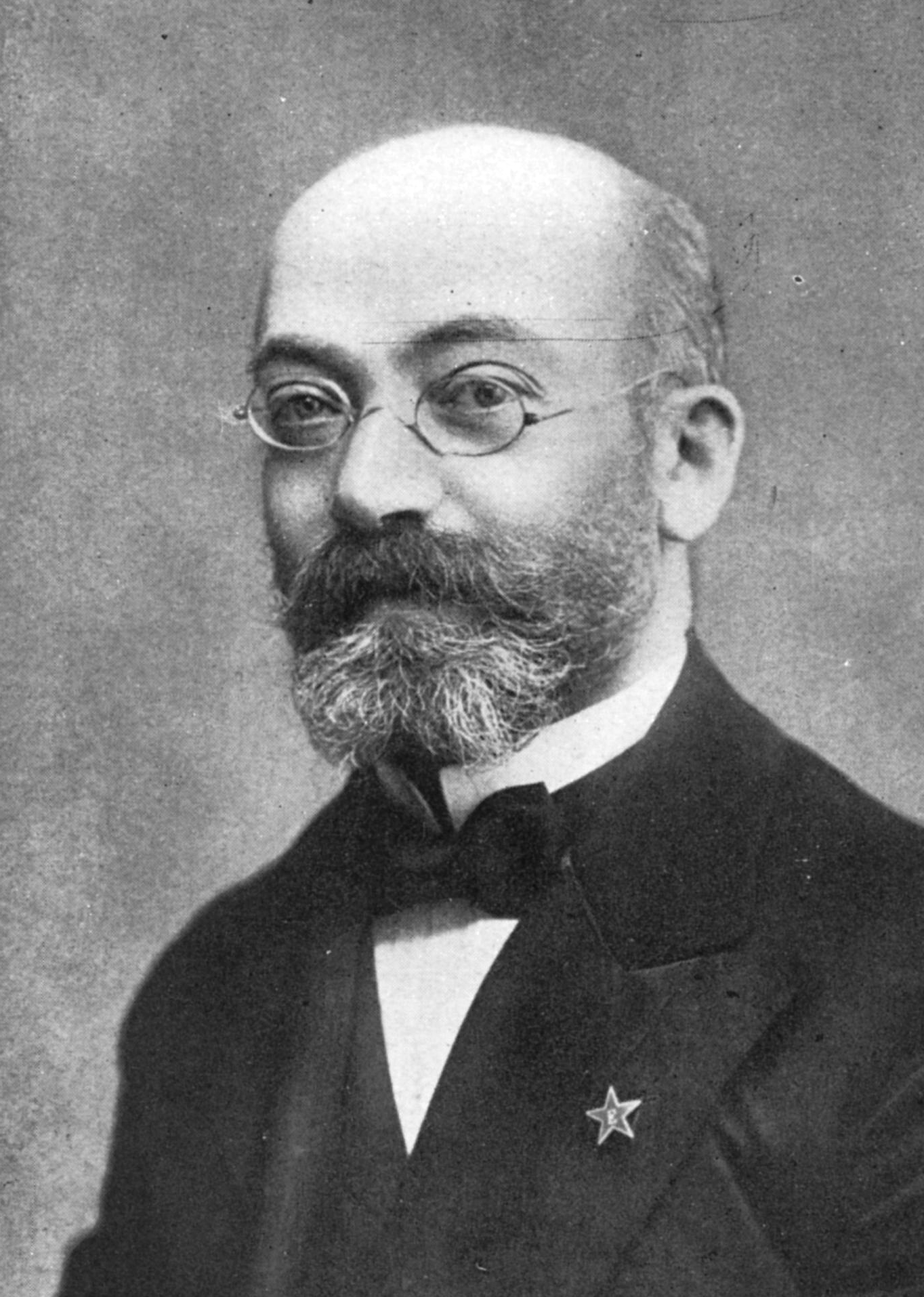
  Zamenhof

== See also ==
- List of linguists
- List of Russian scientists
- List of Russian historians
- Linguistics of the Soviet Union
- Moscow School of Comparative Linguistics
- Russian language
- Russian literature
- Science and technology in Russia
