= Explanatory Dictionary of the Russian Language =

Explanatory Dictionary of the Russian Language (Russian: Толко́вый слова́рь ру́сского языка́) is a lexicographic group name for dictionaries. The definition "explanatory" word does not necessarily appear in the title name of these vocabularies. Among the most known explanatory dictionaries of the Russian language are:

- Explanatory Dictionary of the Living Great Russian Language or Dahl's Explanatory Dictionary, 4 volumes, Russian Empire, 1st edition 1863–1866
- Explanatory Dictionary of the Russian Language or Ushakov Dictionary, 4 volumes, USSR, 1935–1940
- Dictionary of the Russian Language (Ozhegov), 1 volume, USSR, 1st edition 1949
