= Ekaterina Rakhilina =

Russian linguist

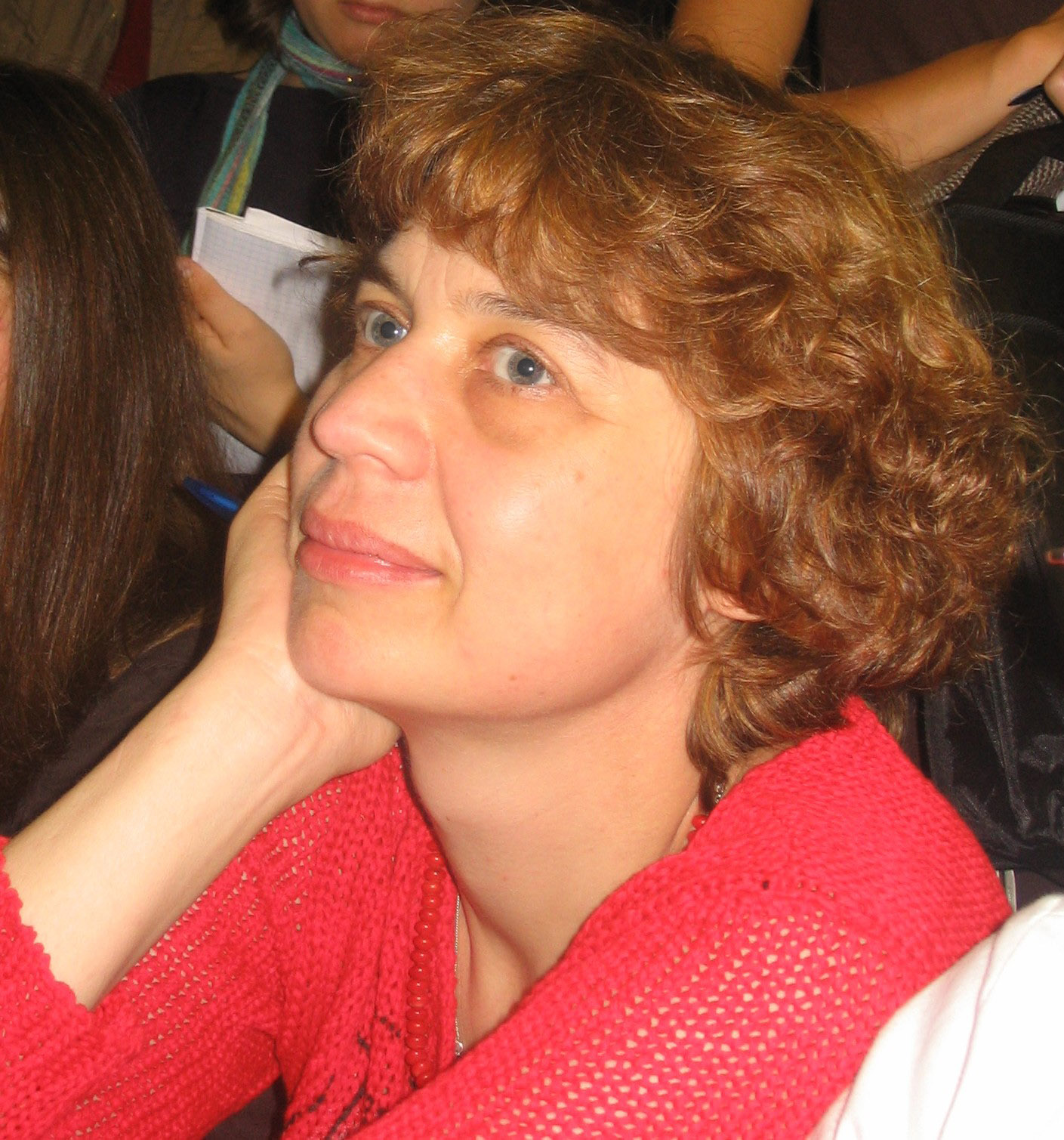
Ekaterina Rakhilina

Ekaterina Vladimirovna Rakhilina (Russian: Екатерина Владимировна Рахилина, born 14 February 1958 in Moscow) is a Russian linguist and professor at the Higher School of Economics in Moscow.

== Biography ==
Rakhilina received her diploma in structural and applied linguistics from Moscow State University in 1980, and her Candidate of Sciences degree from the Institute of Linguistics of the Russian Academy of Sciences in 1988; her thesis topic was Interrogative elements in a human-machine dialogue. In 2000 she received a Doctor of Sciences degree from the same institution on the topic of Cognitive analysis of concrete nouns: semantics and combinability.

Between 1980 and 2007 she worked at the All-Russian Institute for Scientific and Technical Information (VINITI), initially as a senior laboratory assistant, then as a junior scientific researcher (from 1986), scientific researcher (from 1991), and senior scientific researcher (from 2000), before becoming head of VINITI's department of linguistics in 2002. In 2007 she was appointed Leading Scientific Researcher at the Vinogradov Russian Language Institute, still within the Russian Academy of Sciences. In 2011 she simultaneously took up a position as head of department and full professor at the Higher School of Economics.

Rakhilina was elected as an ordinary member of the Academia Europaea in 2019. She is married to fellow linguist Vladimir Plungian with daughter Nadezhda Plungian.

== Research ==
Ekaterina Rakhilina has made contributions to the fields of semantics, linguistic typology, lexicology and lexicography, corpus linguistics, the theory of construction grammar, and the study of Russian grammar, among others.

In the area of lexical typology she has led projects on pain predicates, rotation verbs, words for qualities and physical properties, animal sounds, temperature adjectives, and verbs of movement in water.

== Selected publications ==
- Baranov, A. N., Vladimir Plungian and Ekaterina V. Rakhilina. 1993. Путеводитель по дискурсивным словам русского языка (Guide to the discursive words of the Russian language). Moscow: Pomovsky and Partners.
- Rakhilina, Ekaterina V. 1998. Когнитивная семантика: история, персоналии, идеи, результаты (Cognitive semantics: history, personalities, ideas, results). Семиотика и информатика (Semiotics and informatics) 36, 274–323.
- Rakhilina, Ekaterina V. 2000. О тенденциях в развитии когнитивной семантики (On trends in the development of cognitive semantics). Izvestiia RAN. Seriia literatury i iazyka 3, 3–15.
- Rakhilina, Ekaterina V. 2000. Когнитивный анализ предметных имен: Семантика и сочетаемость (Cognitive analysis of subject names: semantics and compatibility). Moscow: Russian Dictionaries. ISBN 9785911720315
- Rakhilina, Ekaterina V. 2010. Лингвистика конструкций (Construction linguistics). Moscow: Azbukovnik. ISBN 9785911720322
