= Vladimir Plungian =

Russian linguist and academic

- Влади́мир Алекса́ндрович Плунгя́н
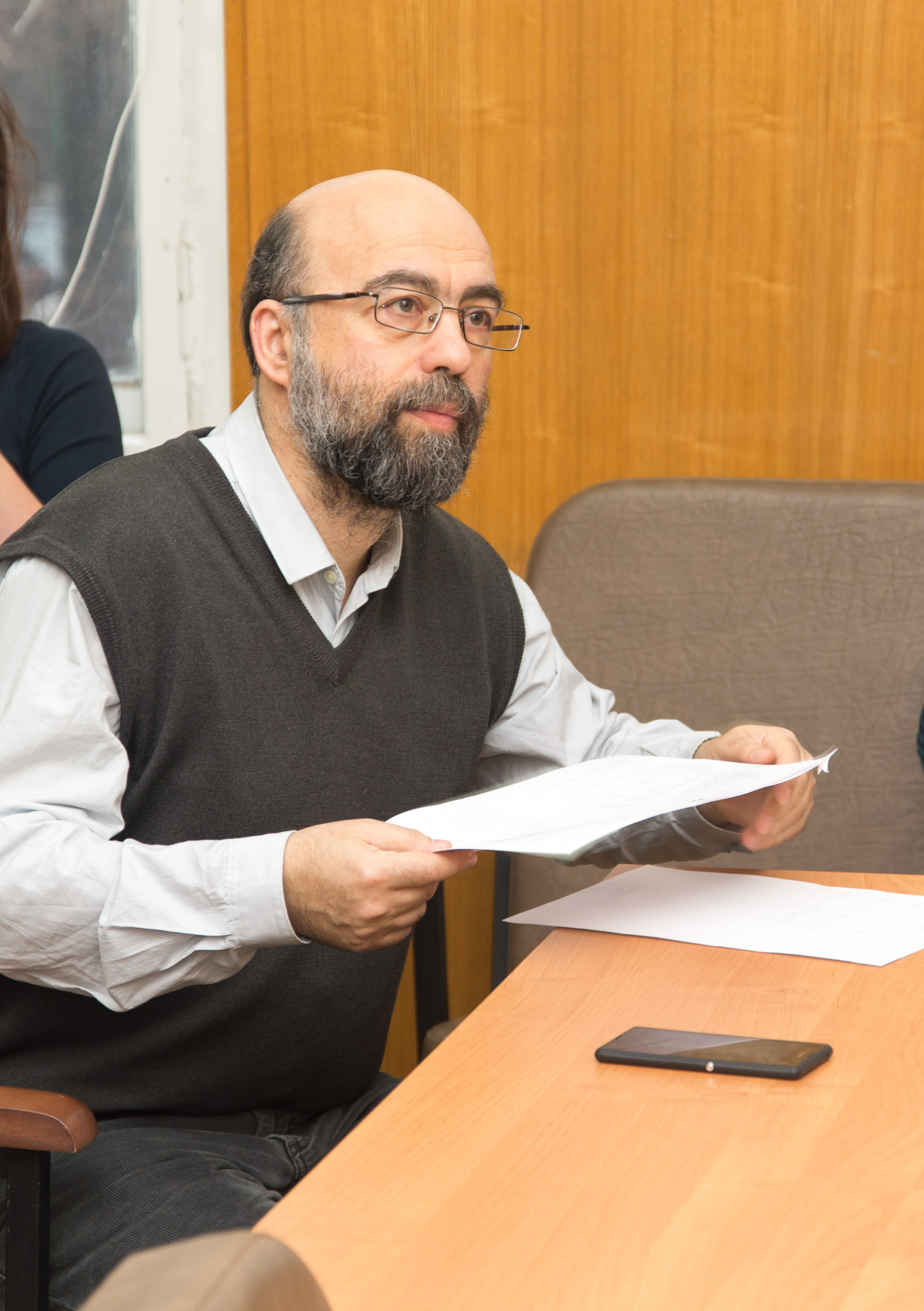
- Plungian in 2015
- Born: September 13, 1960 (age 66)

Academic background
- Education: Moscow State University; Institute of Linguistics of the Russian Academy of Sciences

Academic work
- Discipline: Linguist
- Sub-discipline: Linguistic typology
- Institutions: Institute of Linguistics of the Russian Academy of Sciences; Russian Language Institute; Moscow State University

Vladimir Plungian (Russian: Влади́мир Алекса́ндрович Плунгя́н; born September 13, 1960) is a Russian linguist, specialist in linguistic typology and theory of grammar, morphology, corpus linguistics, African studies, poetics.

Vladimir Plungian is a Doctor of Philology (1998), full member of the Russian Academy of Sciences (2016, corresponding member since 2009), member of Academia Europaea (2017). He has worked at the Institute of Linguistics of the Russian Academy of Sciences and the Russian Language Institute. He is also Professor at the Moscow State University.

== Life ==
Son of Alexander Plungian (1924—2019), air engineer and interpreter, a friend of Yuri Knorozov and Valentin Berestov.

In 1982, Vladimir Plungian graduated from the Department of Theoretical and Applied Linguistics of the Philological faculty of the Moscow State University. During his student years, he took part in a number of linguistic field trips organized by the department, in particular those which studies Tabasaran, Andi, Chamalal languages of Dagestan. The topic of his diploma was Evaluation of probability as a type of modal meaning (supervisor: Alexander Kibrik).

Plungian acquired his Candidate Degree in 1987 at the Institute of Linguistics of the Russian Academy of Sciences, the topic of his work being Morphological derivation and inflection in the verbal system of an agglutinative language (based on Dogon data) (supervisor: Natalia Okhotina). In 1998, he obtained his Doctoral Degree at the Moscow State University, with the thesis Grammatical categories, their counterparts and substitutes.

Plungian is currently the head of the Typology department at the Institute of Linguistics of the Russian Academy of Sciences (since 2004) and the head of the Department of corpus linguistics and linguistic poetics of the Russian Language Institute (since 2006). Since 2013, he is also the deputy director of the Russian Language Institute. He teaches at the Department of theoretical and applied linguistics of the Philological faculty of the Moscow State University (since 1989), and was the head of the department in 2013–2017. He has also taught at various other universities in Moscow, including the Russian State University for the Humanities. He has worked in various research centres in Europe (Belgium, Germany, Spain, Norway, France, Sweden etc.) and conducted fieldwork in Africa (Mali), Dagestan, Armenia, northern parts of Russia, in the Volga region and Pamir.

He is the main editor of the journal Voprosy Jazykoznanija ("Issues in Linguistics") since 2016, and member of editorial boards of various other journals in Russia. He is a member of the international Association for Linguistic Typology, of the Society of Slavic Linguistics and the Societas Linguistica Europaea. In 2017, he was elected as a member of the Academia Europaea.

Vladimir Plungian is married to fellow linguist Ekaterina Rakhilina. Their elder daughter Nadezhda Plungian is an art expert and feminist activist.

== Research ==
The main areas of Vladimir Plungian's research interests are morphology, theory of grammar and grammatical typology (first of all, typology of verbal categories). He has also published on grammatical and lexical semantics, lexicography, linguistic fieldwork and poetics. He is a specialist in African languages, and worked at the Department of African languages of the Institute of Linguistics for more than 20 years. Since 1984, he has systematically studied Dogon languages in Mali, and took part in an international field trip to Mali (1992). He published a series of articles and two monographs on Dogon languages (he was the first person to describe one of the largest languages of this family, Tommo-so). Apart from African languages, he conducted research on various languages of the Caucasus, Oceania, Finno-Ugric languages of Russia, etc. Many of his publications are dedicated to Russian grammar and lexicon.

In the field of grammatical typology, Vladimir Plungian made contributions to the classification of grammatical categories in the languages of the world, described several new verbal categories, proposed a new classification of modal (together with J. van der Auwera), aspectual and evidential meanings. According to Scopus, his most cited journal papers are Modality’s semantic map (1998, with Johan van der Auwera), The place of evidentiality within the universal grammatical space (2001) and Towards a typology of discontinuous past marking (2006, also with van der Auwera).

Since 1990s, Plungian has paid attention to the development of corpus methods in linguistic research. He is one of the creators of the Russian National Corpus and of the East Armenian National Corpus, he also founded various projects on creating corpora for other languages of Russia and beyond (e.g. Beserman Udmurt and Yiddish). He is one of the leaders of the project on corpus grammar of the modern Russian languages since 2015.

Since late 1980s, Plungian has taught linguistic subjects at universities. His main theoretical course for the students of the Department of theoretical and applied linguistics at the Moscow State University is "General morphology". On the basis of this course, he wrote a textbook General morphology: introduction (1st ed., 2000), which remains his most cited book according to Google Scholar. Apart from this course, he has taught various other courses, such as "Russian morphology", "Languages of the world and linguistic areas", "Introduction to language theory".
