= Yartsev =

Origin
- Origin: Slavic
- Meaning: derived from Yarets, meaning "bright"
- Region of origin: Russia

Yartsev (Russian: Ярцев) is a Slavic masculine surname, its feminine counterpart is Yartseva. It may refer to:

- Georgi Yartsev (1948–2022), Soviet/Russian football player
- Marina Yartseva (born 1989), Russian handball player
- Viktoria Yartseva (1906–1999), Soviet/Russian linguist

== See also ==
- Volkov-Yartsev VYa-23
