= Sergey Ozhegov =

Russian lexicographer (1900–1964)

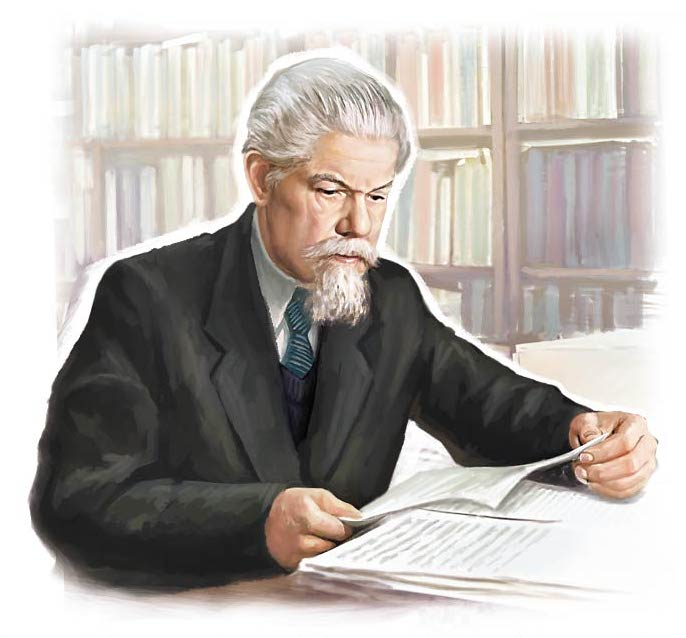
Ozhegov on a 2025 postal cover of Russia

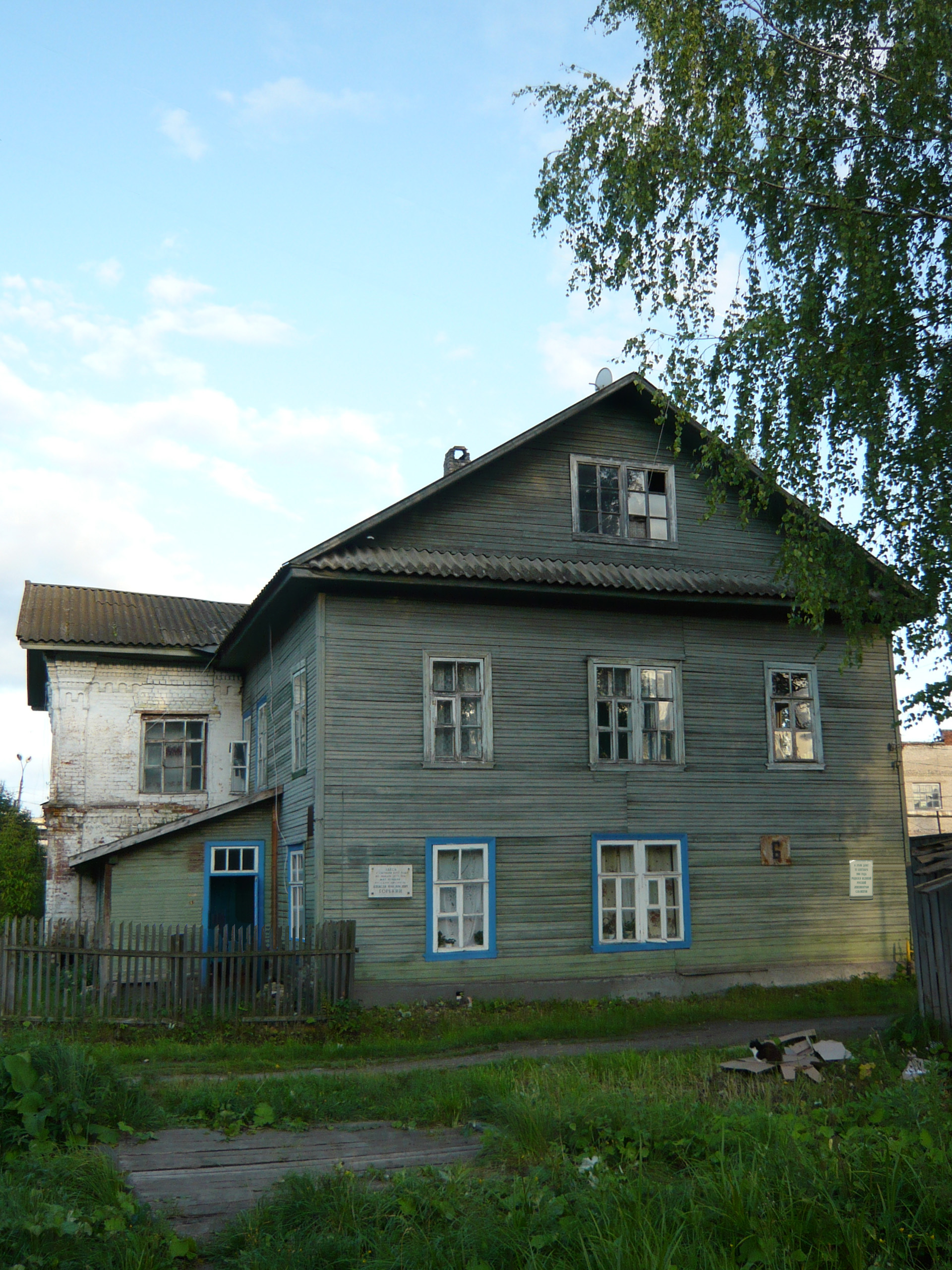
The house in Kuvshinovo in which Ozhegov was born.

Sergey Ivanovich Ozhegov (Russian: Серге́й Ива́нович О́жегов; 22 September 1900 – 15 December 1964) was a Russian Soviet lexicographer, linguist and professor. In 1926 he graduated from the Leningrad University where his teachers included Lev Shcherba and Viktor Vinogradov.

== Biography ==
In 1935–1940, Ozhegov contributed to Dmitry Ushakov's four-volume explanatory dictionary of the Russian language. His main piece of work, the Dictionary of the Russian Language ("Слова́рь ру́сского языка́"), as updated and corrected by Natalia Shvedova, is the most widely used reference for the Russian language today.

Ozhegov also ran the Russian Language Institute as part of the Russian Academy of Sciences to oversee and advise on the correct spelling, grammar and pronunciation of the Russian language. His work was widely recognized in the Soviet Union and he was accorded burial at the Novodevichy Cemetery.

Ozhegov was not without his detractors, especially among Russian émigrés. Vladimir Nabokov, for instance, compared his dictionary with that of Vladimir Dahl unfavorably and, in his novel Ada or Ardor, even called it "moronic".

== Tribute ==
On 22 September 2020, Google celebrated his 120th birthday with a Google Doodle.
