= Vaupés languages =

Vaupés may refer to:

- A branch of the Nadahup languages
- The Vaupés language area
