= Vladimir Mikhaylovich Alpatov =

Russian linguist (b. 1945)

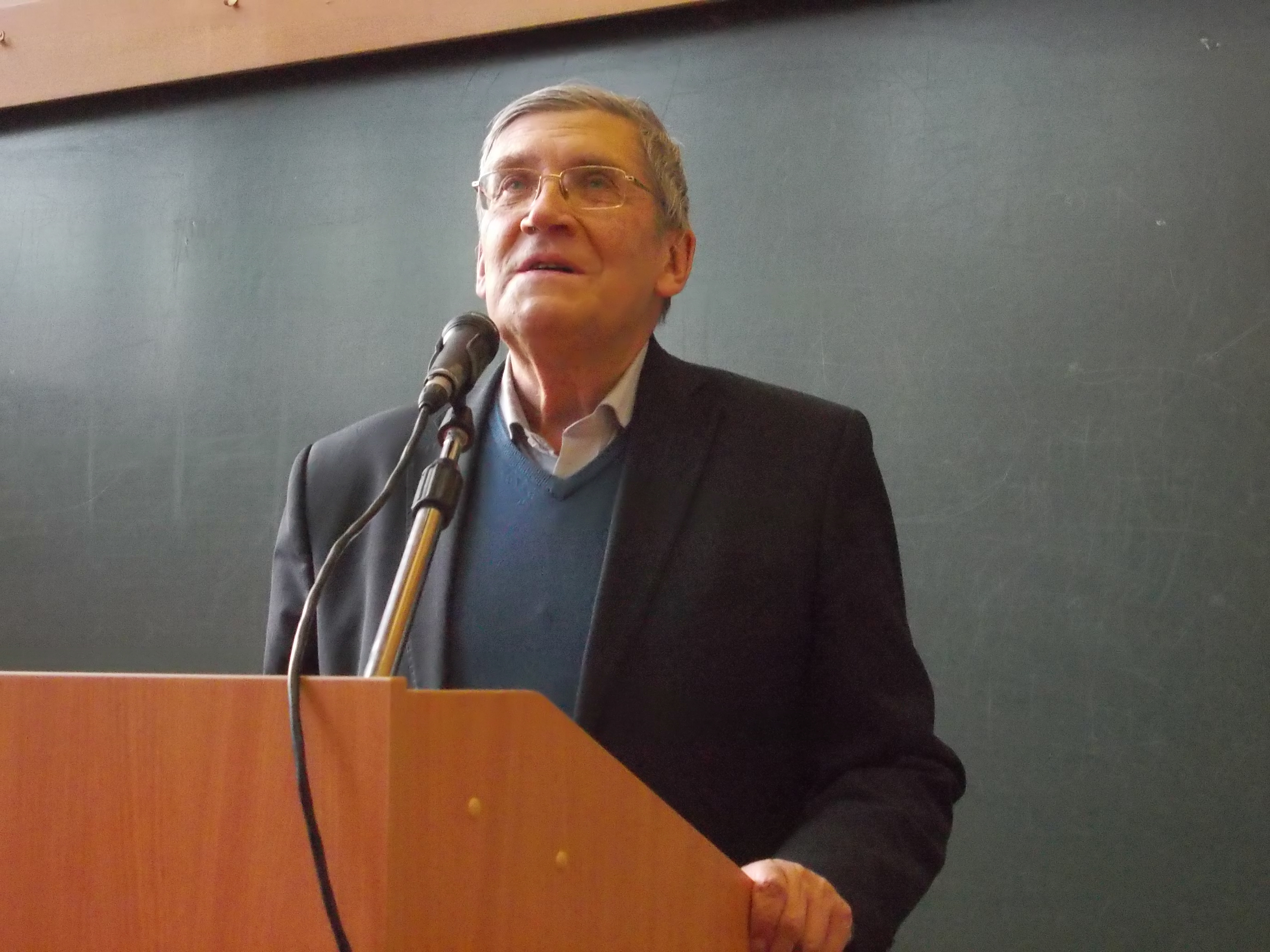

Vladimir Mikhaylovich Alpatov (Russian: Влади́мир Миха́йлович Алпа́тов; born April 17, 1945) is a Soviet and Russian linguist, Doctor of Philology (1983), a Corresponding Member of the Russian Academy of Sciences (2008). He is an author of more than 200 works in linguistics and a specialist in Japanese studies and the history of linguistics.

== Life ==
Vladimir Alpatov was born in the family of a historian and writer Mikhail Alpatov and a historian and byzantinist Zinaida Udaltsova. He graduated from the Department of theoretical and applied linguistics of the Philological faculty of the Moscow State University in 1968.

In 1971 he obtained his Candidate Degree (The grammatical system of politeness forms in modern standard Japanese) at the Institute of Oriental Studies of the Soviet Academy of Sciences. In 1972, he started working at this institute. In 1983 he obtained his Doctoral Degree (Problems of morpheme and word in modern Japanese). For almost 20 years, he was a deputy director of the Institute of Oriental Studies.

Since 1993, he has been teaching a course on the history of linguistics at the Moscow State University as well as at the Russian State University for the Humanities. He is also an author of a university textbook on the history of linguistics (1st ed., 1998).

In 2008 he was elected a Corresponding Member of the Russian Academy of Sciences.

In 2012, Vladimir Alpatov was elected the director of the Institute of Linguistics of the Russian Academy of Sciences for five years. In 2017, he was succeeded by Andrej Kibrik.

== Research ==
Vladimir Alpatov is a specialist in oriental languages (first of all, Japanese), he is one of the authors of a collective 2-volume Theoretical grammar of Japanese (2008). In his Candidate and Doctoral dissertations, Japanese data were used for tackling more general theoretical questions on the notions of word and morpheme, grammatical category, agglutination and some other problematic issues in general morphology and theory of grammar.

Among the main research interests of Vladimir Alpatov is the history of linguistics. He is one of the leading Russian specialists in this field. He is the author of a comprehensive manual on the history of linguistic studies, which briefly describes the development of these studies from the ancient times to the middle of the twentieth century. Equally important are his studies on linguistics in the USSR: he is the author of monographs about Mikhail Bakhtin and Valentin Voloshinov, about the fate of many Slavic and Turkic scholars during the period of Great Purge, about the controversial personality of Nicholas Marr and the fate of his Japhetic theory. Among Alpatov's other works are studies on Japanese sociolinguistics as well as on the language policy in the USSR.

== Major works (books) ==
- Категории вежливости в современном японском языке (1973, 2006, 2009, 2011)
- Структура грамматических единиц в современном японском языке (1979)
- Япония: язык и общество (1988, 2003)
- Изучение японского языка в России и СССР (1988)
- История одного мифа. Марр и марризм (1991, 2004)
- Дело славистов: 30-е годы (1994), with Fedor Ashnin
- Николай-Николас Поппе (1996)
- 150 языков и политика: 1917—2000 (2000)
- История лингвистических учений. Учебное пособие (1998, 1999, 2001, 2005)
- Грамматика японского языка: Введение. Фонология. Супрафонология. Морфонология (2000), with Igor Vardul and Sergej Starostin
- Репрессированная тюркология (2002), with Fedor Ashnin and Dmitry Nasilov
- Волошинов, Бахтин и лингвистика (2005)
- Япония: язык и культура (2008)
- Теоретическая грамматика японского языка: В 2-х кн. (2008), with Peter Arkadiev and Vera Podlesskaya
- Языковеды, востоковеды, историки (2012)
- Языкознание. От Аристотеля до компьютерной лингвистики (2018)
- Слово и части речи (2018)
