= Nadezhda Plungian =

Russian author

Nadezhda Plungyan
- Надежда Владимировна Плунгян
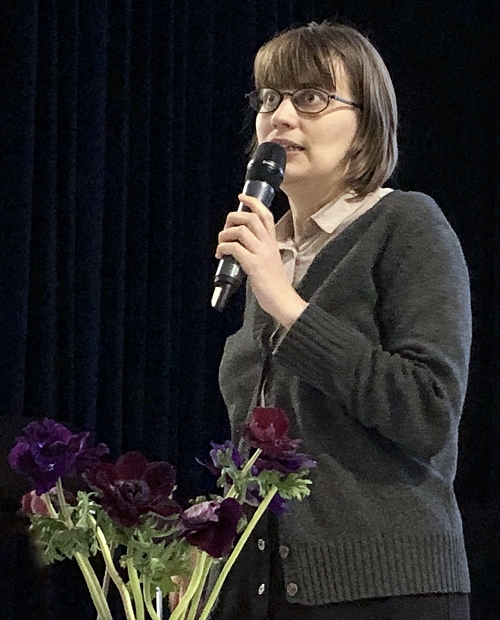
- Born: October 30, 1983 (age 42); Moscow, USSR
- Other name: Nadya Plungian
- Education: Candidate of Art History
- Alma mater: Russian State University for the Humanities
- Occupations: art historian, art critic, feminist
- Parents: Vladimir Plungian (father); Ekaterina Rakhilina (mother)

Nadezhda Plungian (born October 30, 1983, Moscow) is a Russian feminist, art critic, art historian and author.

== Biography ==
Plungian was born into a family of linguists; Vladimir Plungian and Ekaterina Rakhilina.

She graduated in 2005 from Russian State University for the Humanities with a Candidate of Art History. Since 2017, she has been a member of the organization "New Moscow". She is also the co-author of the project The Feminist Pencil and creator of Modernism Without Manifestos and The Roman Babichev Collections.
