= Solomon Adlivankin =

Soviet linguist

- Solomon Adlivankin
- Born: 29 December 1922; Minsk, BSSR
- Died: 14 April 1985; Perm, RSFSR (now Russia)
- Awards: Conspicuous Gallantry Medal, Medal for Victory over Germany in the Great Patriotic War (1941–1945)

Academic background
- Education: Saratov State University (1946)

Academic work
- Main interests: Linguistics, phonetics, dialectology, Old Slavonic language

Solomon Juryevich (correct: Uravich) Adlivankin (Russian: Соломóн Ю́рьевич (correct: У́равич) Адливáнкин, Russian pronunciation: [səlɐˈmon ˈurʲɪvʲɪtɕ ɐdʲlʲɪˈvankʲɪn]) was a Soviet linguist, the Dean of philological faculty at Perm State University (1967–1971), the author of handbooks on Old Slavonic Phonetics, unique in the 1970s; he was one of the Perm derivatology school founders, also he took part in compiling Akchim dialect dictionary.

== Sources ==
- Solomon Adlivankin at Russian Wikipedia: Адливанкин, Соломон Юрьевич // Википедия, свободная энциклопедия.
- The Memoirs of Solomon Adlivankin: А жизнь — одна и неразъятна. Воспоминания о Соломоне Юрьевиче Адливанкине. Пермь: Издательский центр «Титул», 2011. – 352 с., илл.
