= Alexandra Aikhenvald =

Australian-Brazilian linguist (born 1957)

Alexandra Aikhenvald FAHA
- Born: Alexandra Yurievna Aikhenvald; 1 September 1957 (age 69); Moscow, Russian SFSR, Soviet Union
- Citizenship: Australian, Brazilian
- Spouse: R.M.W. Dixon
- Awards: Australian Laureate Fellowship (2012)

Academic background
- Education: Moscow State University (BA, MA); Institute of Oriental Languages (PhD)
- Thesis: Structural and Typological Classification of Berber Languages (1984)

Academic work
- Discipline: Linguist
- Sub-discipline: Linguistic typology; Arawakan languages
- Institutions: La Trobe University; Australian National University; James Cook University; Central Queensland University

Alexandra Yurievna "Sasha" Aikhenvald (born 1 September 1957) is a Soviet-born Australian-Brazilian linguist specialising in linguistic typology and the Arawakan language family (including Tariana) of the Brazilian Amazon basin. She is a professorial research fellow at Central Queensland University.

== Biography ==
Alexandra Aikhenvald was born to a grandson of Yuly Aykhenvald; Natalia Shvedova was her paternal aunt.

Aikhenvald earned her undergraduate degree from Moscow State University, with a thesis on Anatolian languages (Hittite). She also studied Sanskrit, Akkadian, Lithuanian, Finnish, Hungarian, Arabic, Italian and Ancient Greek. Outside of her classes, she learned Estonian and Hebrew.

After graduation, she joined the research staff of the Institute of Oriental Studies of the USSR Academy of Sciences, where she earned her Cand. Sc. degree (Soviet equivalent of Ph.D.) in 1984 with a thesis on the "Structural and Typological Classification of Berber Languages" (1984). She published the first Russian grammar of modern Hebrew in 1985. She also mastered Yiddish, the language of her grandparents, which was, however, never spoken at home.

In 1989–1992, Aikhenvald did research work in Brazil, where she mastered Portuguese, learnt five Brazilian Indian languages, and wrote a grammar of the Tariana language. In 1993 she started her work in Australia, first at Australian National University, later at La Trobe University.

In 1996, the expert on Australian aboriginal languages R. M. W. Dixon and Aikhenvald established the Research Centre for Linguistic Typology at Australian National University in Canberra. On 1 January 2000, the center relocated to La Trobe University in Melbourne. Dixon and Aikhenvald both resigned in May 2008. In January 2009, she became a professor at the James Cook University, where she and R. M. W. Dixon founded The Language and Culture Research Group.

Aikhenvald has published work on Berber languages, Modern and Classical Hebrew, Ndu languages (specifically Manambu of East Sepik Province of Papua New Guinea), alongside a number of articles and monographs on various aspects of linguistic typology.

She has worked on language contact, with reference to the multilingual area of the Vaupés River Basin. She has established a typology of classifiers and worked out parameters for the typology of evidentials as grammatical markers of information sources.

Aikhenvald was elected Fellow of the Australian Academy of the Humanities in 1999. In 2012, she was awarded an Australian Laureate Fellowship. She was elected a member of the Academia Europaea in 2021.

== Publications ==
- Aikhenvald, Alexandra Y.; Dixon, R. M. W.; Onishi, Masayuki, eds. (2010). Non-canonical marking of subjects and objects. Typological studies in language. Amsterdam Philadelphia: John Benjamins Pub. ISBN 978-90-272-2950-2.
- Aikhenvald, Alexandra Y; Dixon, R M W, eds. (22 November 2001). Areal Diffusion and Genetic Inheritance: Problems in Comparative Linguistics. Oxford University PressOxford. doi:10.1093/oso/9780198299813.001.0001. ISBN 978-0-19-829981-3.
- Aikhenvald, Alexandra Y. (2006). Evidentiality. Oxford University Press. ISBN 978-0-19-920433-5.
- Aĭkhenvalʹd, Aleksandra I︠U︡rʹevna; Ala, Jacklyn Yuamali; Laki, Pauline Agnes Luma (4 September 2008). The Manambu Language of East Sepik, Papua New Guinea. OUP Oxford. ISBN 978-0-19-953981-9.
- Aikhenvald, Alexandra Y. (16 September 2010). Imperatives and Commands. OUP Oxford. ISBN 978-0-19-920790-9.
