= Natalia Shvedova =

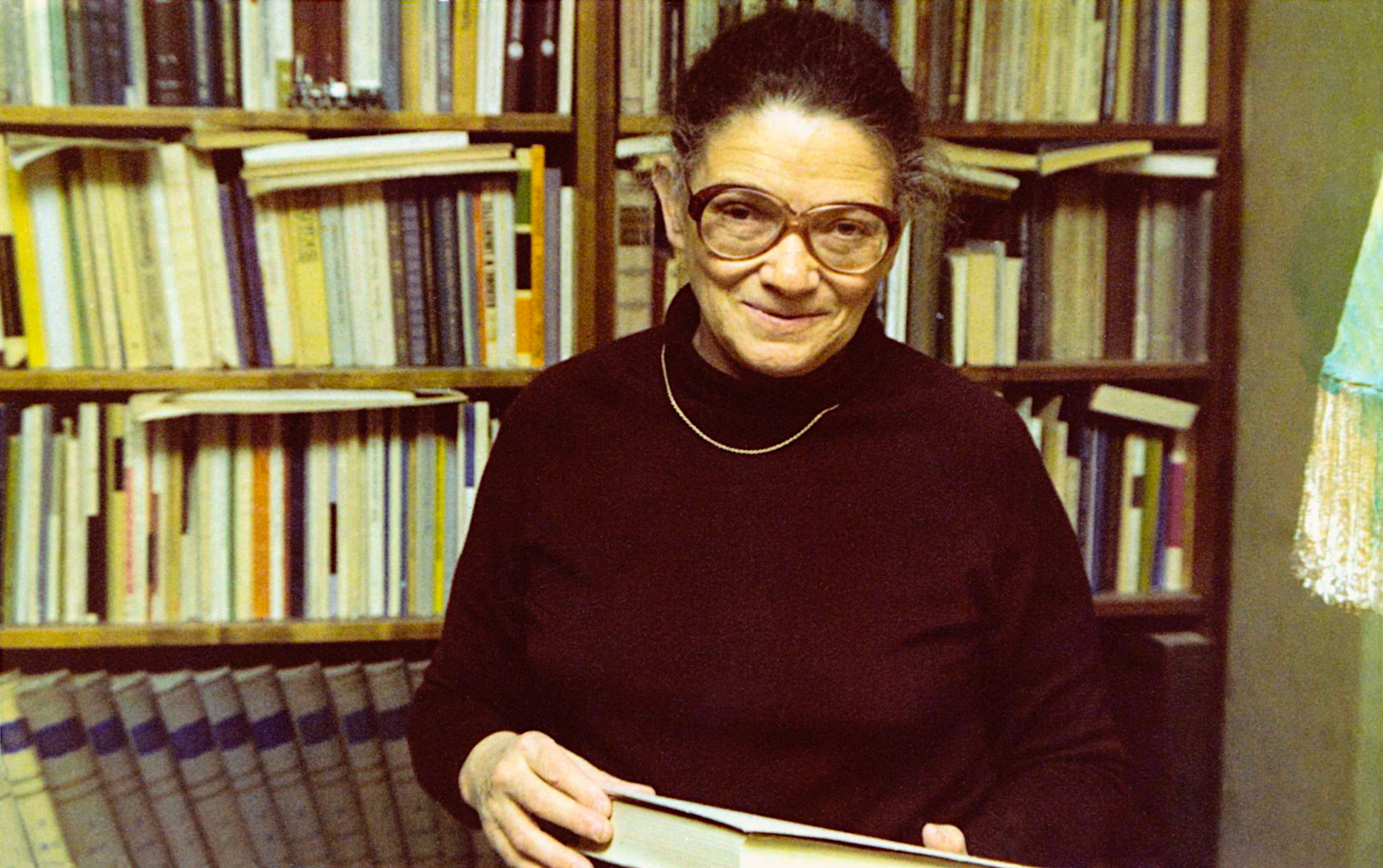
Natalia Shvedova

Natalia Yulievna Shvedova (Russian: Ната́лия Ю́льевна Шве́дова, 25 December 1916 – 18 September 2009) was a Soviet lexicographer who authored several standard outlines of Russian grammar, for which she was awarded the USSR State Prize in 1982.

Yuly Aikhenvald's daughter and Viktor Vinogradov's favourite disciple, Shvedova was elected into the Russian Academy of Sciences in 1997. After Sergei Ozhegov's death in 1964, Shvedova was responsible for updating and correcting his immensely popular explanatory dictionary of the Russian language. Among her later projects was the first semantic dictionary of the language (vol. 1, 1998; vol. 2, 2000).

== Life and career ==
Natalia Shvedova was born in 1916 in Moscow. In 1940 she graduated from Moscow State Pedagogical University, Faculty of Language and Literature. From 1940 to 1944 she occupied the post of senior lecturer at Mordovian State University and Mordovian State Pedagogical University.

In 1946 she became a Candidate of Sciences and started working for Russian Language Institute. In 1958 Natalia Shvedova acquired the rank of Doktor nauk.

== Academic work ==
Natalia Yulievna Shvedova is the author of many fundamental works which compose an integral part of the classical fund of Russian studies. Among them, such major studies as the monograph "Essays on the syntax of Russian colloquial speech" (1960); book "Changes in the system of simple sentences" as part of the monographic study "Essays on the historical grammar of the Russian literary language of the XIX century" (1964); monograph "Active Processes in Modern Russian Syntax" (1966); sections "Syntax of a simple sentence" in the "Grammar of the Modern Russian Literary Language" (1970), in the two-volume academic "Russian Grammar" (1980), and in the "Brief Overview of Russian Grammar" (1989).

Natalia Shvedova is the author of the concept of the "Russian Semantic Dictionary", the theoretical foundations of which were formulated by her in the "Preface" to this dictionary (vol. I, 1998) and other works. Shvedova developed the theoretical program titled "Russian grammar of meanings", the conceptual foundations of which are set forth in her article "The semantic structure of language as the basis of its functioning" (1991), in the book "The system of pronouns as the source of the semantic structure of language and its semantic categories" (in collaboration with A.S. Belousova, 1995), in the monograph "Pronoun and meaning" (1998), as well as in the cycle of studies on the semantics of the Russian verb (2000–2001).

In "Russian Grammar" (1980), the syntax is innovatively defined as the central part of the grammatical system of the language, encompassing the various constructions that form the message. The system-forming factors of the syntax are distinguished, first of all, the types of syntactic units and the corresponding sections of the syntactic system: 1) the syntax of the word; 2) the syntax of the phrase; 3) the syntax of the simple sentence; 4) the syntax of the complex sentence; 5) the syntax of the word form, presented in the four above-mentioned areas.

Natalia Shvedova has participated in creation of numerous collective works, such as 'Bibliographic index of literature on Russian linguistics from 1925 to 1980', 'Grammar of the Modern Russian Literary Language' (1970), 'Russian Grammar' (1980), 'Brief Grammar of the Russian Language' (1989), grammatical volume of 'Selected Works' of academic Viktor Vinogradov and 'Word and grammatical laws of language' (1989).

Shvedova is widely known in Russia as one of the prominent lexicographers, co-author and editor of the explanatory Dictionary of the Russian Language (Ozhegov).

== Awards ==
- 1978 - silver medal of the University of Jan Evangelista Purkine in Brno (Czechoslovakia);
- 1982 - State Prize of the USSR, as the author and editor-in-chief of the academic "Russian Grammar" (volumes 1–2, 1980);
- 1986 – Order of Friendship of Peoples;
- 1990 – Pushkin Prize of the USSR Academy of Sciences;
- 2002 – Order of Friendship;
- 2009 – the Dal gold medal of Russian Academy of Sciences.
