= Dictionary of the Russian Language (Ozhegov) =

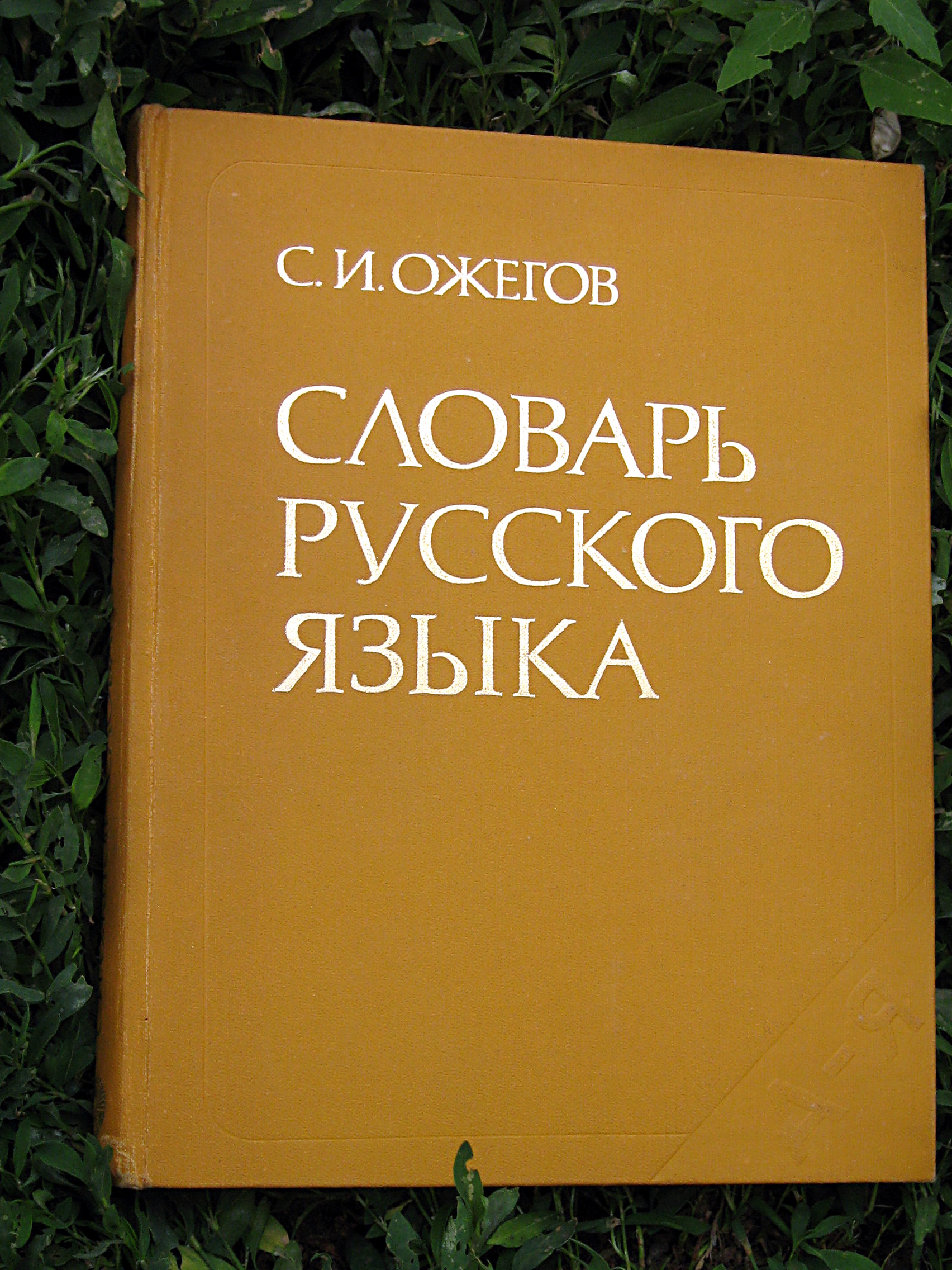
- Cover of 1990 edition
- Author: Sergei Ivanovich Ozhegov
- Original title: Словарь русского языка
- Language: Russian
- Subject: General
- Genre: Reference encyclopedia
- Publisher: M. O. Wolf
- Publication date: 1949 and on
- Publication place: USSR
- Media type: 1 volume (hardbound)

Dictionary of the Russian Language (Russian: Слова́рь ру́сского языка́) is an explanatory dictionary of the Russian language. The first edition was published under the editorship of Ozhegov in 1949. It contained about 57,000 words; its 21st edition (1990) counted 70,000 word entries. From 1992 the dictionary is released with the names of two co-authors, Ozhegov and Shvedova.

== Editions ==
The immediate predecessor of this dictionary was the Explanatory Dictionary of the Russian Language under the editorship of academician Dmitry Ushakov (1873–1942). The last, 4th volume of this edition was signed for printing on December 3, 1940 – half a year before the Great Patriotic War of the Soviet Union with the Nazi Germany began. On April 17, 1942 Ushakov died in Tashkent where he was evacuated from Moscow. The editorial responsibilities and duties for the next publication of an explanatory dictionary passed to professor Sergei Ivanovich Ozhegov (1900–1964), one of the co-editors of Ushakov's Dictionary.

Given the acute shortage of material resources after the war, and pursuing the goal to accelerate the release of a new dictionary, it was decided to reduce its scope by 4 times, restricting it to a single volume. At the same time the composition of vocabulary was also drastically modified, reflecting the changes in language which occurred in the last decade (the first volume of Ushakov's dictionary was signed for printing in 1935).

The compilation of new dictionary was finished by 1949. This first edition of Ozhegov's Dictionary contained about 57,000 words. The author personally corrected and updated the 2nd edition (1952) and the 4th edition (1960). Before Ozhegov died (1964), the 5th and 6th editions were printed.

From the 9th edition (1972) academician Natalia Shvedova (1916–2009) was appointed as the editor. She made improvements to the 13th (1981) and to the 16th edition (1984). From 1992 the dictionary is released with the names of two authors, Ozhegov and Shvedova. The 4th edition of Ozhegov–Shvedova dictionary was printed in 1997, supplemented with 3,000 new entries.
