= Yuly Aykhenvald =

Russian literary critic (1872–1928)

- Юлий Айхенвальд
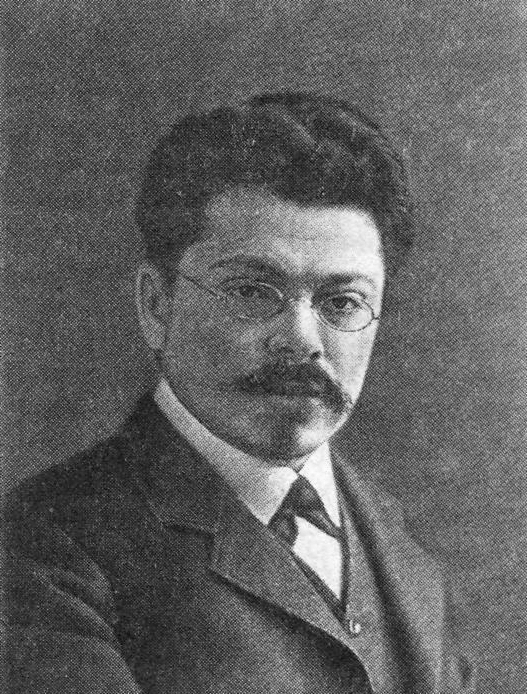
- Aykhenvald sometime before 1917
- Born: 24 January 1872; Balta, Russian Empire (now Ukraine)
- Died: 17 December 1928 (aged 56); Berlin, Weimar Republic
- Education: New Russia University (now Odesa University)
- Children: 4
- Relatives: See § Family
- Writing career
- Pen name: Yu. Ald; B. Kamenetsky
- Language: Russian
- Notable work: Silhouettes of Russian Writers (1909)
- Movement: Aestheticism

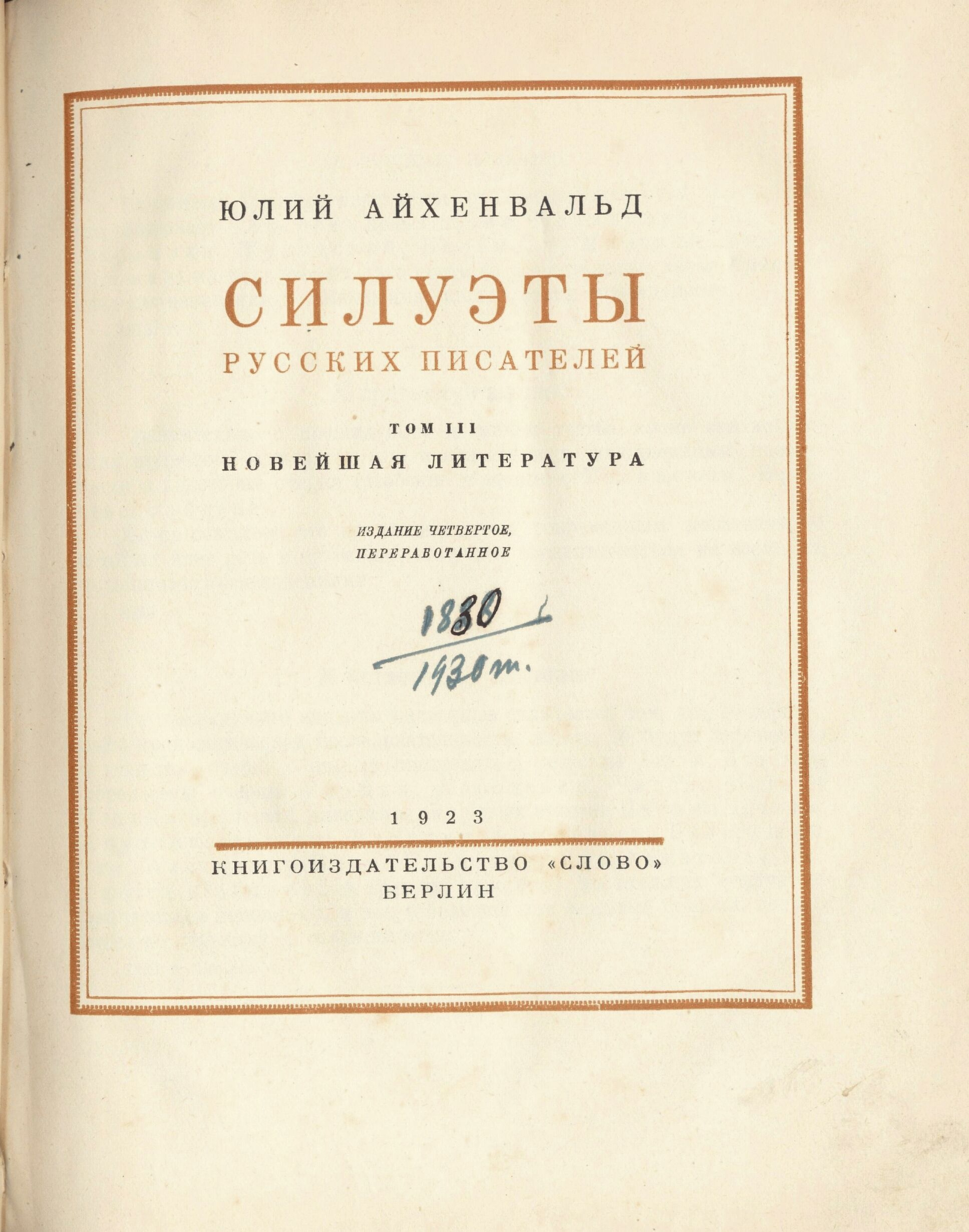
A 1923 edition of Aykhenvald's Silhouettes of Russian Writers

Yuly Isayevich Aykhenvald (also spelled Aikhenvald or Eichenwald; Russian: Ю́лий Иса́евич Айхенва́льд; 24 January 1872 – 17 December 1928) was a Russian Jewish literary critic who developed a native brand of Aestheticism. Russian-American author Vladimir Nabokov called Aykhenvald "a Russian version of Walter Pater".

== Life ==
Aykhenvald was born in Balta, Russian Empire into a rabbi's family and attended the New Russia University in Odessa, where he developed a lasting interest in Schopenhauer's ideas. After moving to Moscow in 1895, he employed a number of pen-names, including Yu. Ald (Ю. Альд) and B. Kamenetsky (Б. Каменецкий).

Aykhenvald followed Schopenhauer in that art is irrational and that the essence of it can be reached only by dint of intuition. He panned most Russian literary critics for applying social and utilitarian criteria to literature and for producing political journalism in the guise of artistic criticism.

Following the Russian Revolution, and the publication of his essay 'Revolution: the leaders and the led' (Revoljucija: ee vozhdi i vedomye'), where he attacked Leon Trotsky personally, Aykhenvald was briefly arrested and then, in 1922, exiled to Germany where he involved himself in several high-profile émigré publications, including the newspaper Rulj. His life was cut short by a tram accident in Berlin. He is buried in the Russian Orthodox cemetery in Tegel, Berlin.

== Family ==
- Lev Aikhenvald (1873–1954), his brother, psychiatrist, author of works on forensic psychiatric examination and organization of psychiatric care.
- Alexander Aikhenvald (1904–1941), his son, an economist and member of Bukharin's school
- Boris Aikhenvald (1902–1938), his son, a translator and philosopher
- Tatiana Aikhenvald (1900–1963), his daughter, a well-known teacher of mathematics
- Yury Aikhenvald (1928–1993), his grandson, a poet, a writer and a dissident
- Alexandra Aikhenvald (born 1957), his great-granddaughter, a linguist
- Natalia Shvedova (1916–2009), his natural daughter, a lexicographer and an expert on Russian syntax

== Books ==
- In his best-known book Silhouettes of Russian Writers (1909) Aykhenvald offers a series of memorable impressionistic sketches of major Russian authors and their works. His argument that Ivan Turgenev was a second-rate writer caused an outcry in the conservative literary circles.

== Quotes ==
- "There are no literary movements, only writers. There is no society, only individuals".

== Online resources ==
- Русское зарубежье (Золотая книга эмиграции) Первая треть XX века. Энциклопедический биографический словарь. М., 1997. 748 с. at apologetika.com
- Русский биографический словарь at www.rulex.ru
- Онлайн-энциклопедия Кругосвет at www.krugosvet.ru
- Биографический указатель at www.hrono.ru
- Works by Yuly Aykhenvald at LibriVox (public domain audiobooks)
