= Viktor Vinogradov =

Soviet linguist and philologist

Viktor Vladimirovich Vinogradov (Russian: Ви́ктор Влади́мирович Виногра́дов; 12 January 1895 [O.S. 31 December 1894] – 4 October 1969) was a Russian and Soviet linguist and philologist who presided over Soviet linguistics after World War II.

== Life and career ==
Vinogradov was born at Zaraysk in 1895. His teachers at the Petrograd Institute of History and Philology included Lev Shcherba and Aleksey Shakhmatov, but Charles Bally's ideas influenced him the most deeply during his formative years. He made his mark as a scholar of Russian literature with a series of works examining the style and language of Russian classical writers, including Alexander Pushkin (1935, 1941), Nikolai Gogol (1936), Mikhail Lermontov (1941), and Anna Akhmatova (a family friend, 1925). In 1926 he married Nadezhda Malysheva (Надежда Матвеевна Виноградова-Малышева, 1897–1990), a singing teacher.

From the standpoint of linguistics, Vinogradov set out as a good-natured critic of the Russian formalists: he was on friendly terms with many of them. After moving from Leningrad to Moscow in 1929 he became implicated in the "Slavists conspiracy" and the authorities exiled him to Vyatka in 1934. Two years later, he was allowed to settle somewhat closer to the capital, in Mozhaysk, only to be exiled to Siberia after Hitler's invasion of Russia in 1941. His father, an Orthodox priest, was purged in 1930.

After Joseph Stalin became alarmed with the (mis)management of Soviet linguistics by Nikolai Marr and his followers, Vinogradov found himself appointed Director of the Linguistics Institute (1950). The authorities heaped honors on him in profusion: he was elected into the Academy of Sciences of the Soviet Union and was awarded the Stalin Prize (1951). This sudden reversal of fortune made him willing to gratify the authorities, as was demonstrated by his participation in the notorious Sinyavsky–Daniel trial (1965–1966). Vinogradov's rise to power cemented his followers (Sergey Ozhegov, Natalia Shvedova) into the dominant academic school of Soviet linguistics. The Russian Language Institute, which he administered from 1958, still bears his name.

He died in Moscow in 1969.
