= Alexander Belskiy =

- Alexander Belskiy
- Born: 18 January 1921; Oryol, USSR
- Died: 7 August 1977 (aged 56); Perm, USSR
- Awards: Medal "For the Victory over Japan"

Academic background
- Education: University of Dnipropetrovsk (Ukraine)

Academic work
- Main interests: Philology, Literary Criticism, English Studies

Alexander Andreevich Belskiy (Russian: Алекса́ндр Андрéевич Бéльский, Russian pronunciation: [ɐlʲɪˈksandr ɐnˈdrʲejɪvʲɪtɕ ˈbelʲskʲɪj]) was a Soviet specialist in literary criticism, Anglicist (he did researches in realism development in the English literature). Alexander Belskiy founded Perm school of research in non-Russian Philology. Also, he founded the Faculty of Philology at Perm State University and he was its first Dean in 1960–1964 and 1971–1977. Moreover, he founded the Department of Foreign literature at Perm State University, and he was its Head in 1965–1977. His famous student is Boris Proskurnin, the Dean of Faculty of Foreign languages and Literature at Perm State University.

== Sources ==
- Alexander Belskiy at Russian Wikipedia: Бельский, Александр Андреевич // Википедия, свободная энциклопедия.
