= Explanatory Dictionary of the Living Great Russian Language =

1863 Russian dictionary by Vladimir Dal

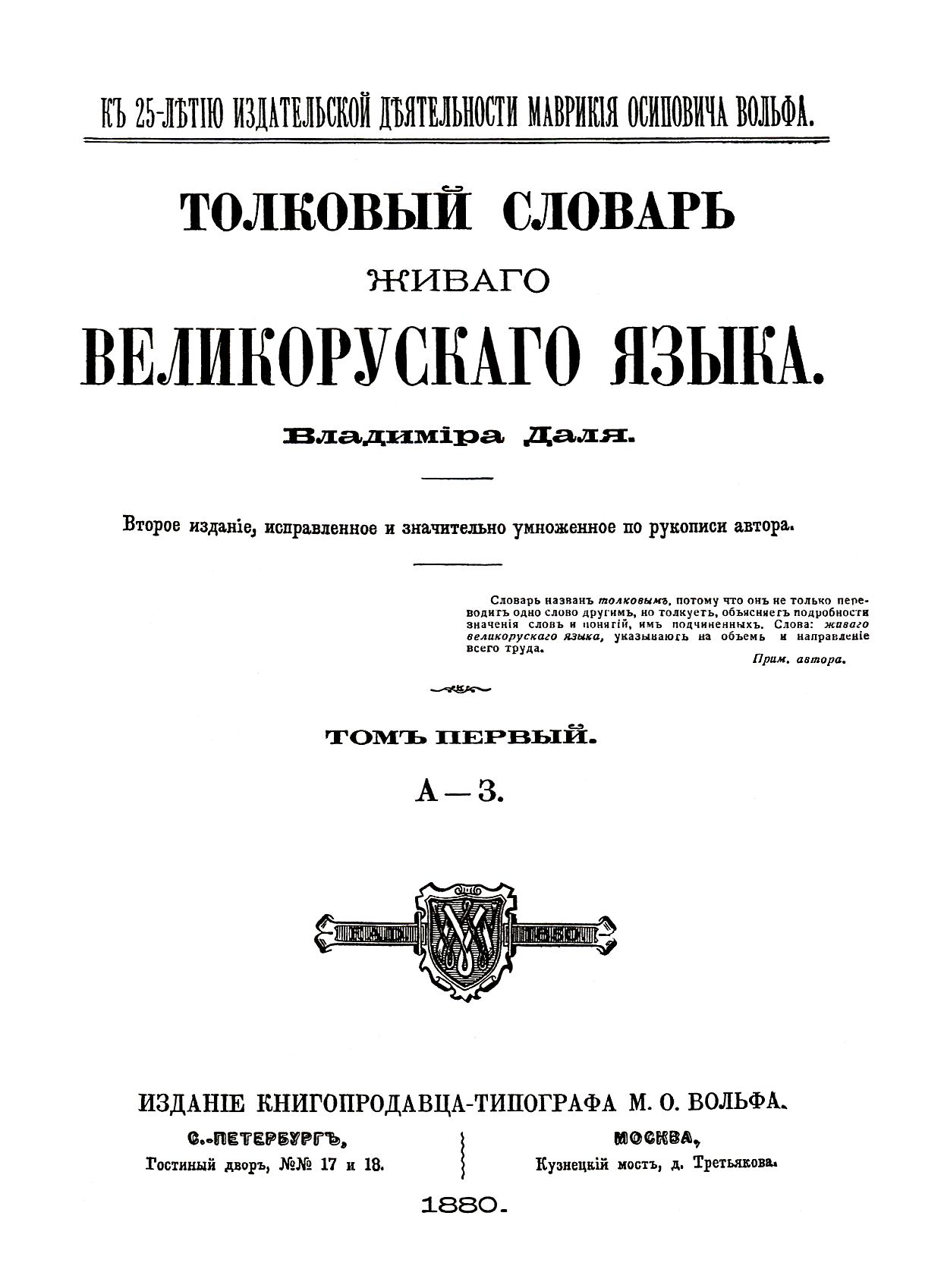
- Vol.1 of the 1880 edition
- Author: Vladimir Dal
- Original title: Толковый словарь живого великорусского языка
- Language: Russian
- Subject: General
- Genre: Reference encyclopedia
- Publisher: M. O. Wolf
- Publication date: 1863 and on
- Publication place: Russian Empire
- Media type: 4 volumes (hardbound)

The Explanatory Dictionary of the Living Great Russian Language (Russian: Толко́вый слова́рь живо́го великору́сского языка́), commonly known as Dal's Explanatory Dictionary (Russian: Толко́вый слова́рь Да́ля), is a major explanatory dictionary of the Russian language. It contains about 220,000 words and 30,000 proverbs (3rd edition). It was collected, edited and published by academician Vladimir Ivanovich Dal (Russian: Влади́мир Ива́нович Даль; 1801–1872), one of the most prominent Russian language lexicographers and folklore collectors of the 19th century.

Dal's Explanatory Dictionary of the Great Russian language was the only substantial dictionary printed repeatedly (1935, 1955) in the Soviet Union in compliance with the old rules of spelling and alphabet, which were repealed in 1918.

== History and features ==
The author shows his specific understanding of the Russian language on the cover, using the old spelling Толковый словарь живаго великорускаго языка (with single "s" in "Russian"). However, this is a unique spelling deviation from the standard grammar, on which Dal insisted. In his speeches at the Russian Geographical Society (traditionally published with his forewords in a preface) Dal opposes the "illiterate" distortion of words in vulgar parlance. However he distinguishes between these distortions and regional dialectical variations, which he collected meticulously over decades of travel from European Russia to Siberia.

Another principle on which Dal insisted rigorously was the rejection of transliterated/transcribed foreign-language roots as base words, in favour of Russian roots. However certain loanwords like "проспект" (Prospekt (street)) were included.

== Editions ==
=== 1863-1866 ===
The first edition. Dal lived to see only this edition of his dictionary.

=== 1880 ===
The editors of the posthumous second edition (1880–1883) expanded it using the author's words cards, but, following the norms of Russian public morality, abstained from adding entries with the obscene words of the Russian mat.

=== 1903 ===
In 1903, linguist Baudouin de Courtenay insisted as editor of the third edition on including new and obscene words (in total around 20,000). Although this was criticised, this version sold well. There was a fourth edition in 1912–1914. Later these versions were censored during the communist rule.

=== 1935 ===
The fifth edition (1935) was supported by Joseph Stalin and had a high cultural significance, since it was printed in the old "spelling" (repealed in 1918), thus providing continuity in the perception of pre-revolutionary literature by new generations. This edition was based on the second edition (1880–1883). The Baudouin de Courtenay edition was never reprinted in Soviet times.

=== 1955 ===
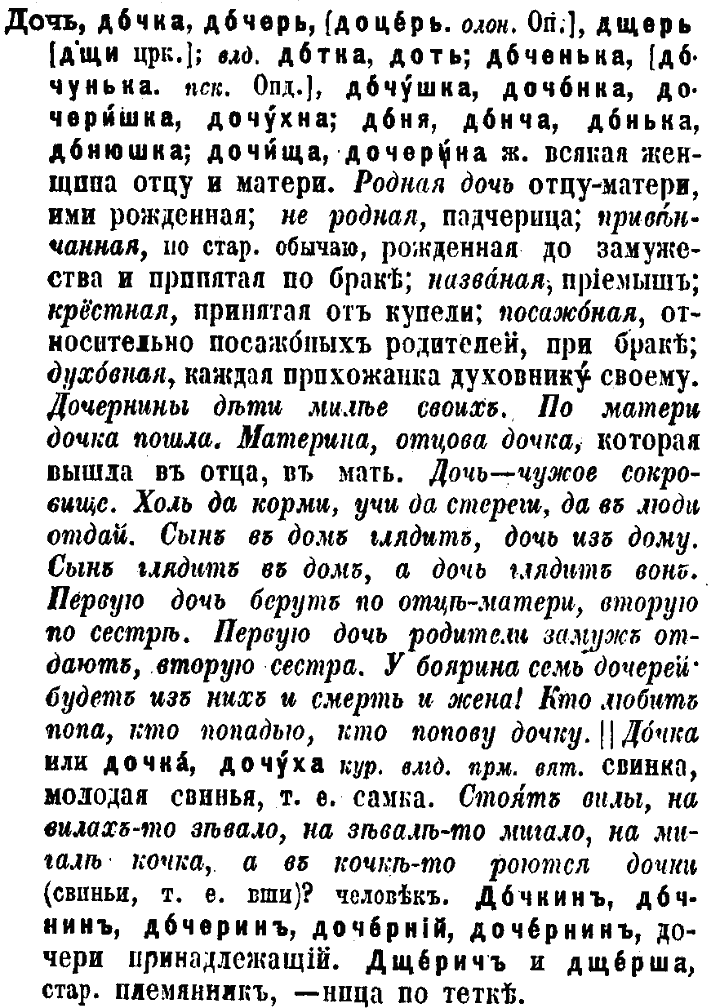
An entry for the word 'daughter' ('дочь') and its derivatives

In 1955, the dictionary was reprinted in the Soviet Union again with a circulation of 100,000. This sixth edition relied also on that of 1880–1883 (i.e. without obscene words). Copies of the second edition were used as the source for the stereotype (photographically reproduced) reprint. However, this was not an exact reproduction of an original: derivatives of the root жид (zhyd, jew) were removed from page 541 of volume 1.

This ambiguous censorship stems from controversy over the use of two roots used concurrently in Russian and in many other European languages. Although Russian жид is equivalent to Czech: žid, English: jew; while Russian: еврей corresponds to Czech: hebrejci and English: hebrew, the first form (widely used in Russian literature through the 19th century (Lermontov, Gogol et al.)) was later considered an expletive with a tinge of antisemitism. To ensure "political correctness", the 1955 editors decided to remove the entire entry, keeping the original page numbers by increasing the line spacing on the censored page.

=== List ===
- Толковый словарь живого великорусского языка. Vol. I–IV (1st ed.). М., СПб.: О-во любителей российской словесности. 1863–1866.
- Толковый словарь живого великорусского языка. Vol. I–IV (2nd ed.). СПб., М.: М. О. Вольф. 1880–1883.
- de Courtenay, Baudouin, ed. (1903–1909). Толковый словарь живого великорусского языка. Vol. I–IV (3rd ed.). СПб., М.: М. О. Вольф.
- de Courtenay, Baudouin, ed. (1912–1914). Толковый словарь живого великорусского языка. Vol. I–IV (4th ed.). СПб., М.: М. О. Вольф.
- Вл. Даль. Толковый словарь. Vol. I–IV (5th ed.). М.: ОГИЗ, 1935.
- Вл. Даль. Толковый словарь живого великорусского языка. Vol. I–IV (6th ed.). М.: Гос. изд-во иностр. и национ. словарей, 1955.

== See also ==
- Explanatory Dictionary of the Russian Language (Ushakov)

== Sources ==
- Terras, Victor, Handbook of Russian Literature (Yale University Press, 1990), ISBN 0-300-04868-8
