= Andrej Kibrik =

Russian linguist and academic

- Андре́й Алекса́ндрович Ки́брик
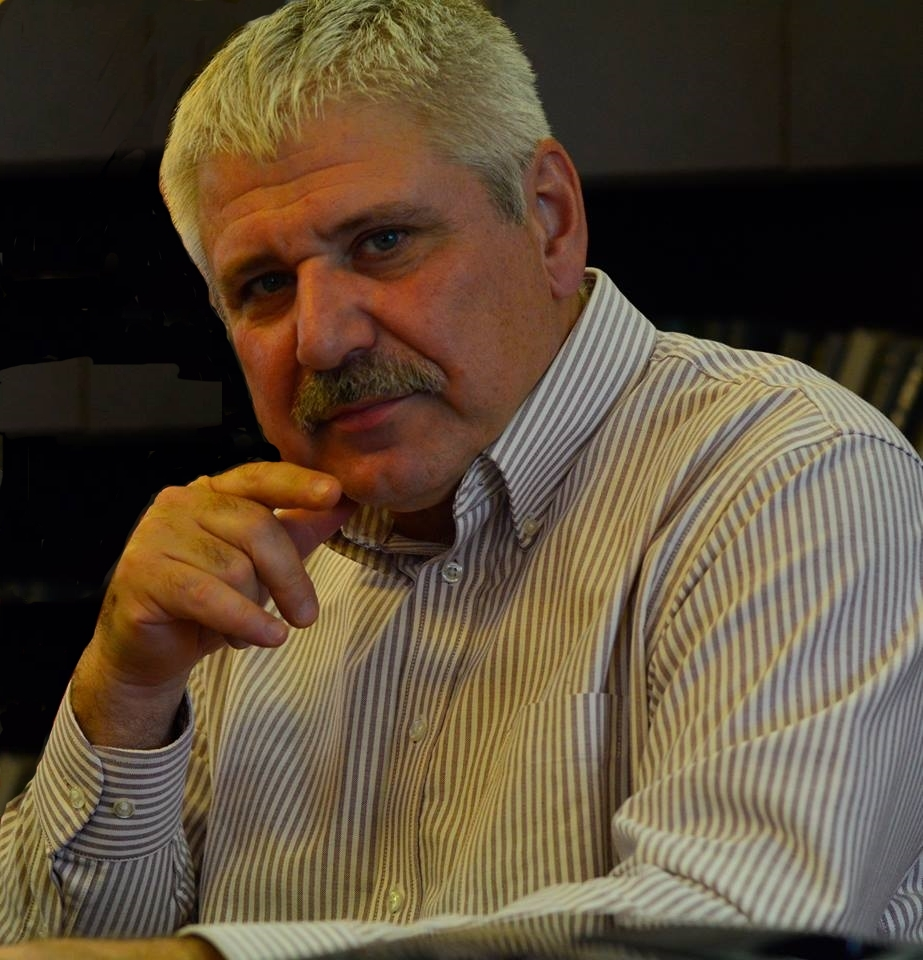
- Kibrik in 2017
- Born: June 18, 1963 (age 63); Moscow, Russian SFSR, USSR
- Relatives: Alexander Kibrik (father)

Academic background
- Education: Moscow State University; Institute of Linguistics of the Russian Academy of Sciences
- Thesis: Analiz diskursa v kognitivnoj perspektive [Discourse analysis in a cognitive perspective] (2003)

Academic work
- Discipline: Linguist
- Sub-discipline: Cognitive linguistics; Linguistic typology; Areal linguistics; Syntax; Semantics

Andrej Kibrik (Russian: Андре́й Алекса́ндрович Ки́брик; born June 18, 1963) is a Russian linguist. He is the director of the Institute of Linguistics of the Russian Academy of Sciences (since 2017), professor at the Philological Faculty of the Moscow State University, and member of the Academia Europaea since 2013.

Kibrik's main research interests lie in the fields of cognitive linguistics, discourse analysis, semantics, grammar, functional linguistics, linguistic typology, areal linguistics, language documentation. He has worked on Athabaskan languages, Caucasian languages, and Turkic languages, among others.

== Life ==
Kibrik was born in Moscow. Both of his parents, Alexander Kibrik and Antonina Koval, were linguists. He graduated from the Department of theoretical and applied linguistics of the Philological Faculty of the Moscow State University in 1984 (his academic supervisor was Sandro Kodzasov). During his studies at the university, he took part in several linguistic expeditions organized by the Department, in particular to Dagestan, Tuva, Svaneti, Abkhazia .

In 1988, Kibrik obtained his Candidate Degree at the Institute of Linguistics of the Academy of Sciences of the Soviet Union (his supervisor was Viktoria Yartseva). Since then he started working at the Institute as a research fellow and later became the head of the group working on the encyclopaedic series Languages of the World. He is now the head of the Typology and Areal linguistics Department of the Institute.

Since 1995, Kibrik has taught at the Philological faculty of the Moscow State University. Since 2011, he is the head of the Center of cognitive studies at the Philological faculty.

In 2003, Kibrik obtained his habilitation, writing Discourse analysis in a cognitive perspective. In 2017, he was elected the director of the Institute of Linguistics.

=== Family ===
- Father — Alexander Kibrik, linguist
- Mother — Antonina Koval, linguist
  - Sister — Nina Kibrik, painter
  - Wife — Mira Bergelson, linguist

== Research ==
Kibrik's research interests are rather broad: he is a specialist in the fields of cognitive linguistics, typology, areal linguistics, syntax and semantics. Among his major publications there are also works on discourse analysis, on multimodal approaches to studying spoken language, and on sign languages.

Studies carried out by Kibrik are multidisciplinary and are performed in close interaction with psychologists and neurophysiologists. He is one of the principal researchers of the Night Dream Stories project, in which the corpus of stories produced by healthy children was compared to those told by children with neurotic disorders, the results serving the basis for the methodology of psycholinguistic diagnostics.

Since 1991, Kibrik has been engaged in fieldwork on Indian languages of North America and is currently working on a grammar of the Upper Kuskokwim language, one of the critically endangered Athabaskan languages. He is also involved in research on a Russian dialect of Alaska.

Kibrik has acted as a supervisor of numerous master and doctoral dissertations on the Russian sign language. He also proposed to include the Russian sign language into the official Russian census questionnaire, which afterwards led to official recognition of the Russian sign language by the Russian government.

Kibrik is member of the Society for the Study of the Indigenous Languages of the Americas, Association for Linguistic Typology, Societas Linguistica Europaea, Society of Cognitive Science and other associations. He is also member of the editorial boards of a number of scientific journals like Studies in Language, Cognitive Linguistics, Frontiers in Cognition, among others.wife king ptolemy "lago"

== Major works ==
- Mira B. Bergelson, Andrej A. Kibrik, Wayne Leman, Marina Raskladkina. 2017. Dictionary of Ninilchik Russian: 2017 version. Anchorage: Minuteman Press. (pdf)
- Kibrik, Andrej A. (18 January 2012). "Toward a typology of verbal lexical systems: A case study in Northern Athabaskan". Linguistics. 50 (3). doi:10.1515/ling-2012-0017. S2CID 56224456.
- Andrej A. Kibrik. 2012. What's in the head of head-marking languages? In: Pirkko Suihkonen, Bernard Comrie and Valery Solovyev (eds.), Argument Structure and Grammatical Relations: A Crosslinguistic Typology. Amsterdam: Benjamins, 229-258.
- Andrej A. Kibrik. 2011. Reference in discourse. Oxford: Oxford University Press. 651 pp.
- Mira B. Bergelson, Andrej A. Kibrik, Wayne Leman. 2011. Ninilchik Russian: The first language of Ninilchik, Alaska. Lulu Press. Preprint edition. 179 pp.
- Andrej A. Kibrik. 2011. Cognitive discourse analysis: local discourse structure. In: Marcin Grygiel and Laura A. Janda (eds.) Slavic Linguistics in a Cognitive Framework. Frankfurt/New York: Peter Lang Publishing Company, 273-304.
- Andrej A. Kibrik and Vera I. Podlesskaya (eds.). 2009. Rasskazy o snovidenijax: korpusnoe issledovanie ustnogo russkogo diskursa [Night Dream Stories: A corpus study of spoken Russian discourse]. Moscow: Jazyki slavjanskix kul’tur. 736 pp.
