= Tamara Erofeyeva =

Russian linguist

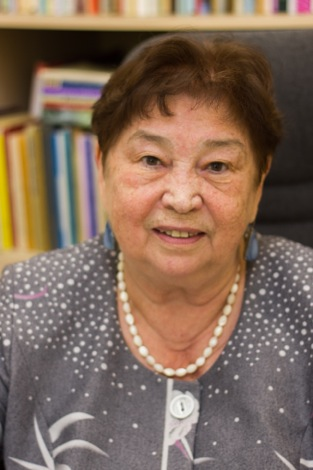
- Tamara Erofeyeva
- Born: June 29, 1937 (age 89); Perm, Russian SFSR, Soviet Union
- Occupations: Department of theoretical and applied linguistics, Perm State National Research University
- Awards: Honorary Figure of Russian Higher Education

Academic background
- Education: Doctor of Philology (1995)
- Alma mater: Perm State University
- Doctoral advisor: Margarita Nikolayevna Kozhina

Academic work
- Institutions: Professor (1999) Perm State National Research University
- Main interests: Linguistics, philology
- Website: www.psu.ru/personalnye-stranitsy-prepodavatelej/e/tamara-ivanovna-erofeeva

Tamara Ivanovna Erofeyeva (Russian: Тамáра Ивáновна Ерофе́ева, pronounced [tɐˈmarə ɪˈvanəvnə jɪrɐˈfʲejɪvə]; born June 29, 1937) is a Soviet-Russian linguist. She is a Doctor of Philology, served as Dean of the philological faculty at Perm State University (1982 - 1988), is a leader of Sociolinguistic study of urban language, head of the school of Socio- and Psycholinguistics in the Department of General and Slavonic Linguistics at Perm State National Research University, and is an Honorary Figure of Russian Higher Education.

== Works ==
Some of her works include:

- Список научных трудов профессора Т. И. Ерофеевой
- Талант учителя — в его учениках: К юбилею Тамары Ивановны Ерофеевой
- отв. ред. Б. В. Кондаков; Перм. гос. нац. иссл. ун-т. — Пермь, 2012. С. 13-33
