= Viktoria Yartseva =

Russian linguist

Viktoriya Nikolayevna Yartseva (Викто́рия Никола́евна Я́рцева, 1906–1999) was a Russian linguist and director of the Linguistics Institute of the Russian Academy of Sciences from 1971 to 1977. She specialized in English and Celtic studies and theoretical linguistics.

== Bibliography ==
- 1949, Реакционная сущность теории мирового англо-саксонского языка (The reactionary nature of the theory of the world Anglo-Saxon language)
- 1960, Историческая морфология английского языка (Historical Morphology of the English Language)
- 1961, Исторический синтаксис английского языка (Historical Syntax of the English Language)
- 1968, Взаимоотношение грамматики и лексики в системе языка (The Relationship of Grammar and Vocabulary in the System of Language)
- 1969, Развитие национального литературного английского языка (The Development of a National Literary English Language)
- 1981, Контрастная грамматика (Contrast Grammar)
- 1985, История английского литературного языка IX-XV вв (History of English Literature of the 9th to 15th Centuries)
- 1984, "Basic Typological Units"
- 1987, "General and specific tendencies in historical change of language type"
- 1988, "Some Problems of Syntactic Reconstruction"
