= Akchim =

River in Perm Krai, Russia

Location
- Country: Russia

Physical characteristics
- Mouth: Vishera
  - coordinates: 60°27′51″N 58°2′25″E
- Length: 60 km (37 mi)
- Basin size: 518 km^{2} (200 sq mi)

Basin features
- Progression: Vishera→ Kama→ Volga→ Caspian Sea

The Akchim (Russian: Акчим) is a river in Perm Krai, Russia, a left tributary of the Vishera. The river is 60 kilometres (37 mi) long, and its drainage basin covers 518 square kilometres (200 mi^{2}). The Akchim flows into Vishera 190 kilometres (120 mi) from the larger stream's mouth.
