= Vladimir Dal =

Russian lexicographer (1801–1872)

- Владимир Даль
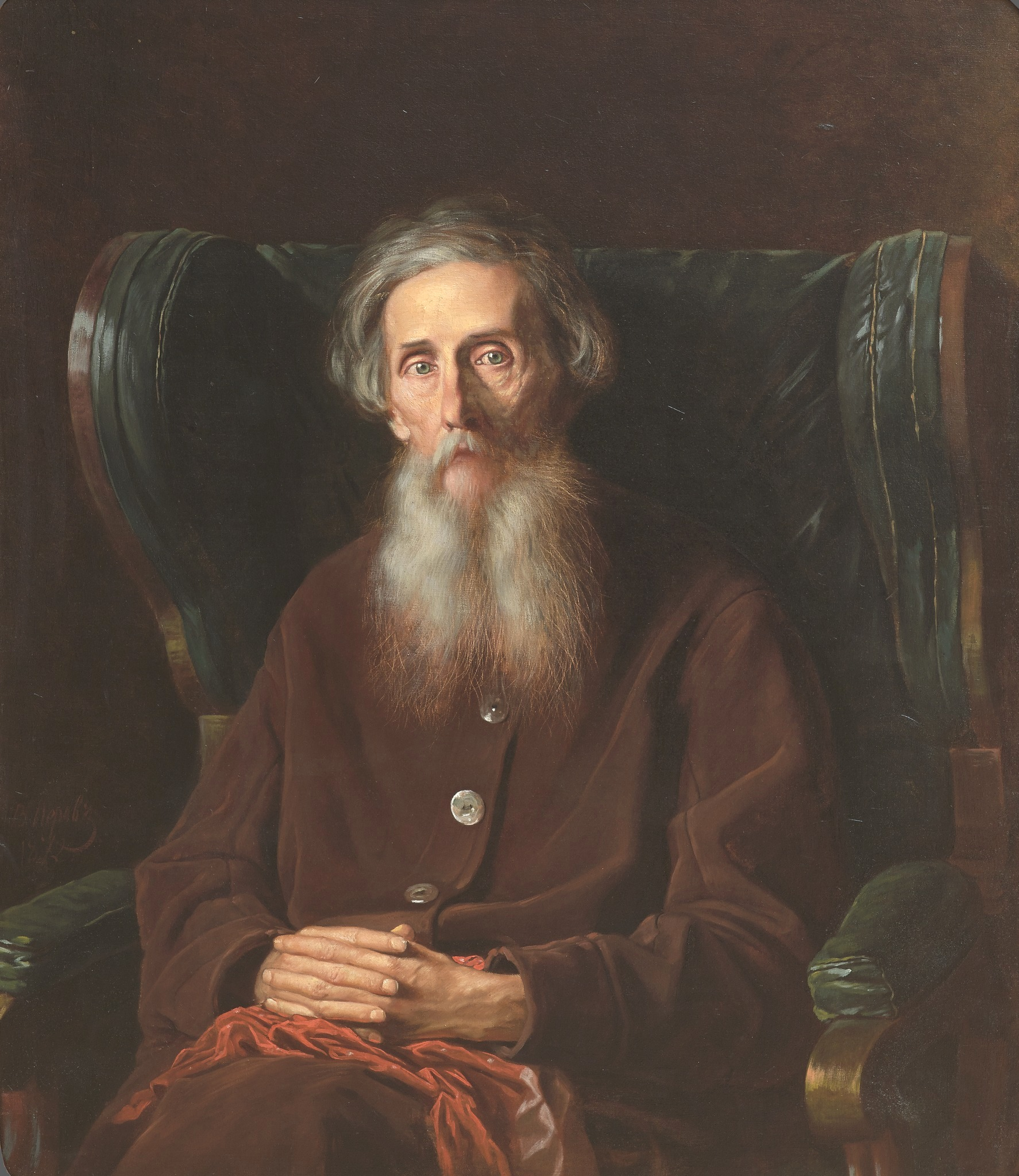
- Portrait by Vasily Perov, 1872
- Born: 22 November 1801; Lugansky Zavod, Yekaterinoslav Governorate, Russian Empire
- Died: 4 October 1872 (aged 70); Moscow, Russian Empire
- Resting place: Vagankovo Cemetery, Moscow
- Known for: Explanatory Dictionary of the Living Great Russian Language
- Scientific career
- Fields: Lexicography

Vladimir Ivanovich Dal (Note: Alternatively transliterated as Dahl, the original spelling of his father's surname in the Latin script.) (Russian: Владимир Иванович Даль, [vlɐˈdʲimʲɪr ɨˈvanəvʲɪdʑ ˈdalʲ]; 22 November 1801 – 4 October 1872) was a Russian lexicographer, speaker of many languages, Turkologist, and founding member of the Russian Geographical Society. During his lifetime, he compiled and documented Russian oral traditions, many of which became part of modern folklore.

== Early life ==
Vladimir Dal's father was a Danish physician named Johan Christian von Dahl (1764 – 21 October 1821), a linguist versed in the German, English, French, Russian, Yiddish, Latin, Greek and Hebrew languages. His mother, Julia Adelaide Freytag, had German and probably French (Huguenot) ancestry; she spoke at least five languages and came from a family of scholars.

The future lexicographer was born in the town of Lugansky Zavod (present-day Luhansk, Ukraine), in Novorossiya – then under the jurisdiction of Yekaterinoslav Governorate, part of the Russian Empire. (The settlement of Lugansky Zavod dated from the 1790s.) Dal grew up under the influence of varied mixture of people and cultures which existed in that area.

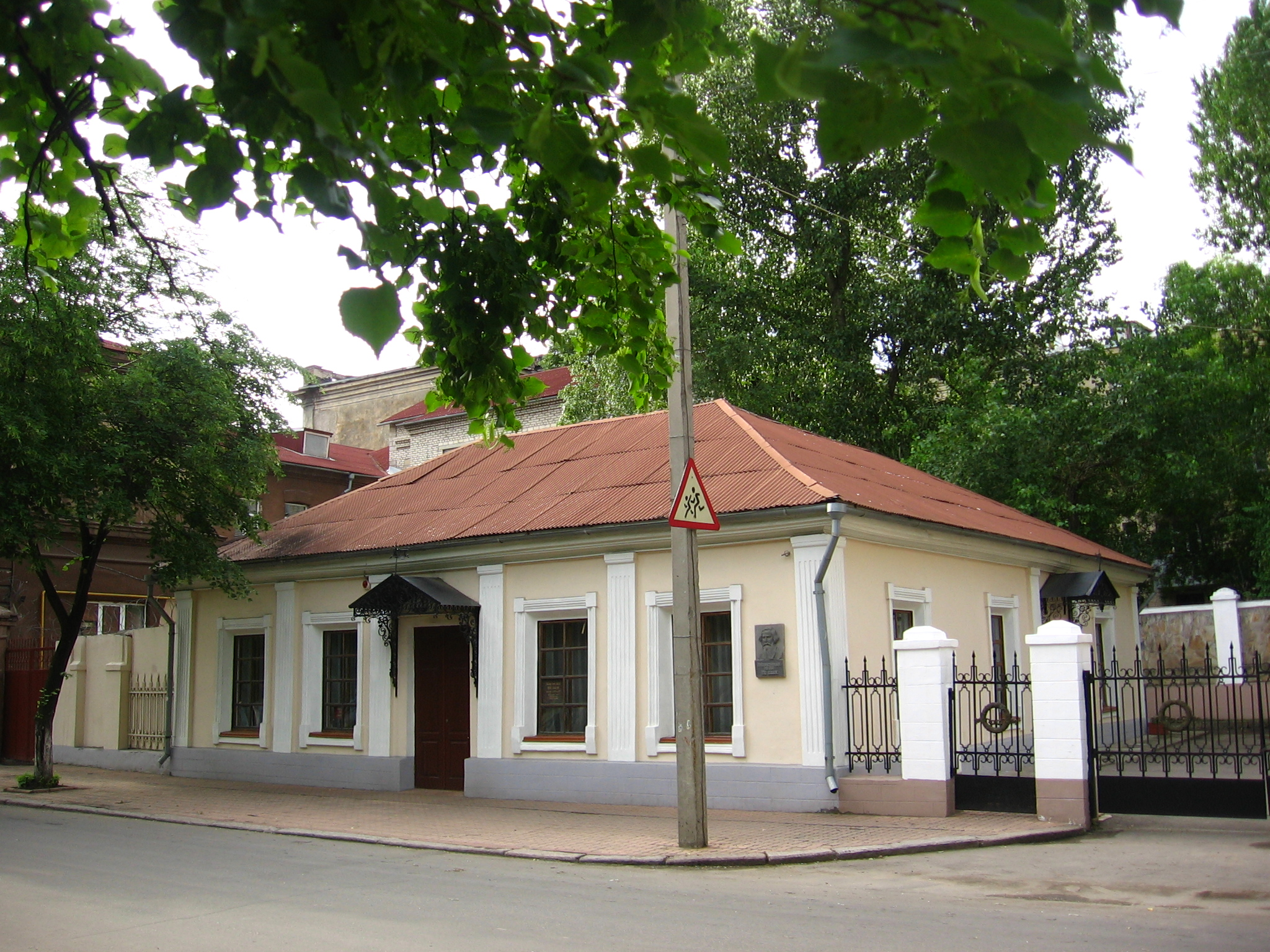
Dal's house and museum in Luhansk, Ukraine

Dal served in the Imperial Russian Navy from 1814 to 1826, graduating from the Saint Petersburg Naval Cadet School in 1819. In 1826, he began studying medicine at Dorpat University; he participated as a military doctor in the Russo-Turkish War and in the campaign against Poland in 1831–1832. Following disagreement with his superiors, he resigned from the Military Hospital in Saint Petersburg and took an administrative position with the Ministry of the Interior in Orenburg Governorate in 1833. He took part in General Vasily Perovsky's military expedition against Khiva in 1839–1840. Dal then served in administrative positions in Saint Petersburg (1841–1849) and in Nizhny Novgorod (from 1849) before his retirement in 1859.

Dal had an interest in language and folklore from his early years. He started traveling by foot through the countryside, collecting Russian sayings and fairy tales. He published his first collection of Russian fairy tales (Russian: Русские сказки, romanized: Russkie skazki) in 1832. Dal's friend Alexander Pushkin (1799–1837) put some other tales, yet unpublished, into verse. They have become some of the most familiar texts in the Russian language. After Pushkin's fatal duel in January 1837, Dal was summoned to his deathbed and looked after the great poet during the last hours of his life. In 1838 Dal was elected to the Saint Petersburg Academy of Sciences.

== Lexicographic studies ==
In the following decade, Dal adopted the pen name Kazak Lugansky ("Cossack from Luhansk") and published several realistic essays in the manner of Nikolai Gogol. He continued his lexicographic studies and extensive travels throughout the 1850s and 1860s. Having no time to edit his collection of fairy tales, he asked Alexander Afanasyev to prepare them for publication, which followed in the late 1850s. Joachim T. Baer wrote:

While Dal was a skilled observer, he lacked talent in developing a story and creating psychological depth for his characters. He was interested in the wealth of the Russian language, and he began collecting words while still a student in the Naval Cadet School. Later he collected and recorded fairy tales, folk songs, birch bark woodcuts, and accounts of superstitions, beliefs, and prejudices of the Russian people. His industry in the sphere of collecting was prodigious.

His magnum opus, Explanatory Dictionary of the Living Great Russian Language, was published in four huge volumes in 1863–1866. The Sayings and Bywords of the Russian people, featuring more than 30,000 entries, followed several years later. Both books have been reprinted innumerable number of times. Baer says: "While an excellent collector, Dal had some difficulty ordering his material, and his so-called alphabet-nest system was not completely satisfactory until Baudouin de Courtenay revised it thoroughly in the third (1903–1910) and fourth (1912–1914) editions of the Dictionary."

Dal was a strong proponent of the native rather than adopted vocabulary. His dictionary began to have a strong influence on literature at the beginning of the 20th century; in his 1911 article "Poety russkogo sklada" (Poets of the Russian Mold), Maximilian Voloshin wrote:

Just about the first of the contemporary poets who began to read Dal was Vyacheslav Ivanov. In any case, contemporary poets of the younger generation, under his influence, subscribed to the new edition of Dal. The discovery of the verbal riches of the Russian language was for the reading public like studying a completely new foreign language. Both old and popular Russian words seemed gems for which there was absolutely no place in the usual ideological practice of the intelligentsia, in that habitual verbal comfort in simplified speech, composed of international elements.

While studying at Cambridge, Vladimir Nabokov bought a copy of Dal's dictionary and read at least ten pages every evening, "jotting down such words and expressions as might especially please me"; Aleksandr Solzhenitsyn took a volume of Dal with him as his only book when he was sent to the prison camp at Ekibastuz. The encompassing nature of Dal's dictionary gives it critical linguistic importance even today, especially because a large proportion of the dialectal vocabulary he collected has since passed out of use. The dictionary served as a base for Vasmer's Etymological Dictionary of the Russian Language, the most comprehensive Slavic etymological lexicon.

For his great dictionary Dal was honoured by the Lomonosov Medal, the Constantine Medal (1863) and an honorary fellowship in the Russian Academy of Sciences.

He is interred at the Vagankovo Cemetery in Moscow. To mark the 200th anniversary of Vladimir Dal's birthday, UNESCO declared the year 2000 The International Year of Vladimir Dal.

== Legacy ==
- In 1986, a museum in Moscow, Russia, was opened in honor of Dal.
- In Luhansk, Ukraine, the home of Dal has been converted into a Literary Museum where the employees managed to collect the lifetime editions of Dal's complete literary works.
- In 2001, a Luhansk (Ukraine) university was named after Dal, the East Ukrainian Volodymyr Dahl National University (from his name in Ukrainian).
- In 2017, the State Literary Museum in Moscow, Russia received a new official name: the State Museum of the History of Russian Literature named after V. I. Dal.
- On 22 November 2017, Google celebrated his 216th birthday with a Google Doodle.

== Damascus affair ==
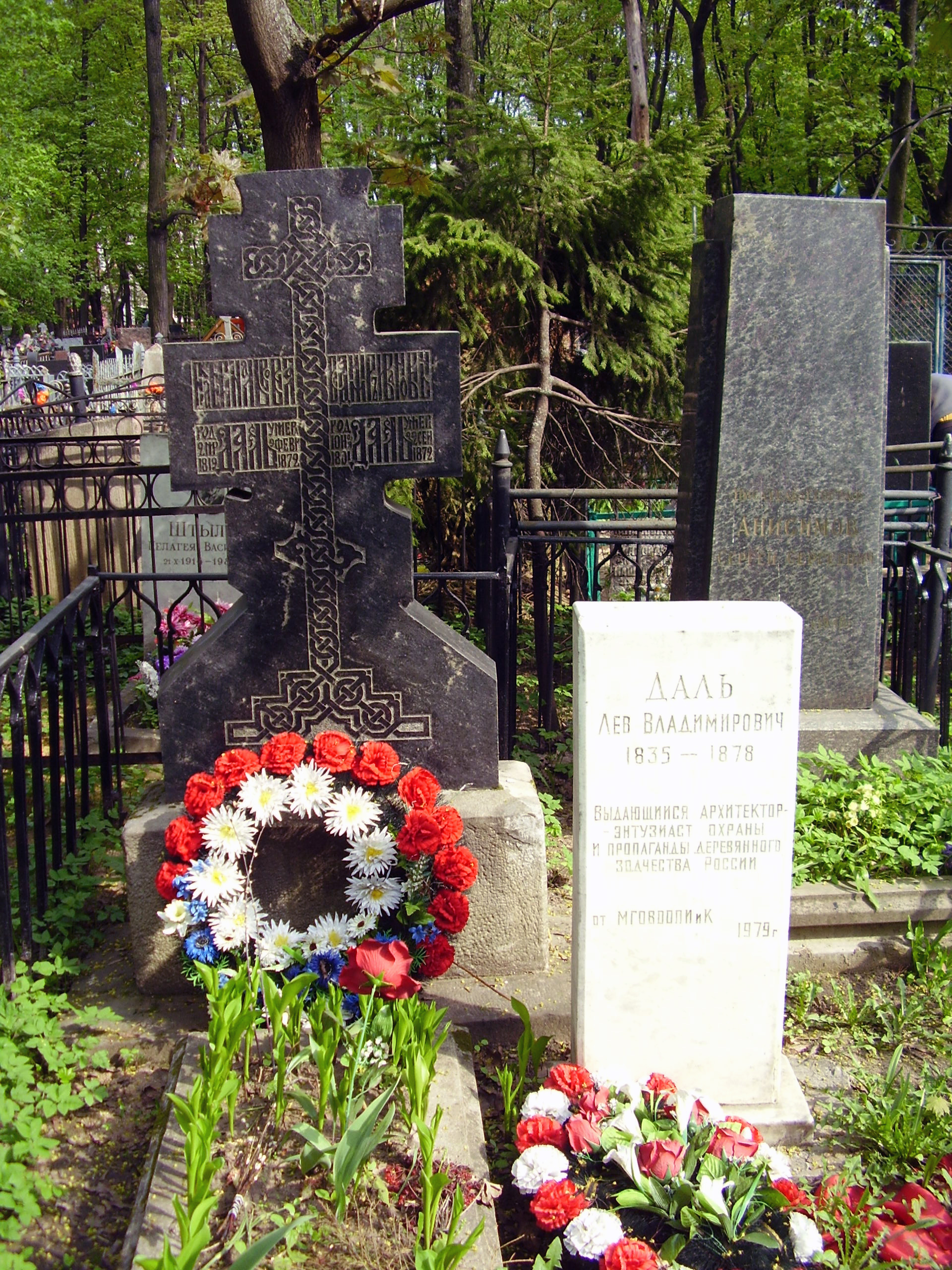
Dal's grave

Dal served in the Ministry of Domestic Affairs. His responsibilities included overseeing investigations of murders of children in the western part of Russia.

In 1840, the Damascus affair had resulted in the accusation that Jews use the blood of Christian children for ritual purposes, and Nicholas I instructed his officials, especially Vladimir Dal, to thoroughly investigate the claim. In 1844, just 10 copies of a 100-page report, intended only for the Czar and senior officials, were submitted. The paper was entitled "Investigation on the Murder of Christian Children by the Jews and the Use of Their Blood." The document stated although the vast majority of Jews had not even heard of ritual murder, such murders and the use of blood for magical purposes were committed by sects of fanatical Hasidic Jews. While the paper is often attributed to Dal, the question of the authorship (or multiple authorships) remains contested.

In 1914, 42 years after Dal's death, during the blood libel trial of Menahem Mendel Beilis in Kiev, the then 70-year-old report was published in Saint Petersburg under the title Notes on Ritual Murders. The name of the author was not stated in this new edition, intended for the general public.

== Sources ==
- Dal, Vladimir, Explanatory Dictionary of the Living Great Russian Language, Vol.I, Diamant, Sankt Peterburg, 1998 (reprinting of 1882 edition by M.O.Volf Publisher Booksellers-Typesetters)
- Terras, Victor, Handbook of Russian Literature (Yale University Press, 1990), ISBN 0-300-04868-8
