= Explanatory dictionary =

Dictionary with additional information

An explanatory dictionary or defining dictionary is a dictionary that provides definitions of word meanings at its entries. It may give additional information on pronunciation, grammar, etymology, and so on. In practice, it is equivalent to a monolingual general dictionary. Such dictionaries are usually meant for native speakers of the language.
