= Institute of Linguistics of the Russian Academy of Sciences =

Russian research institute

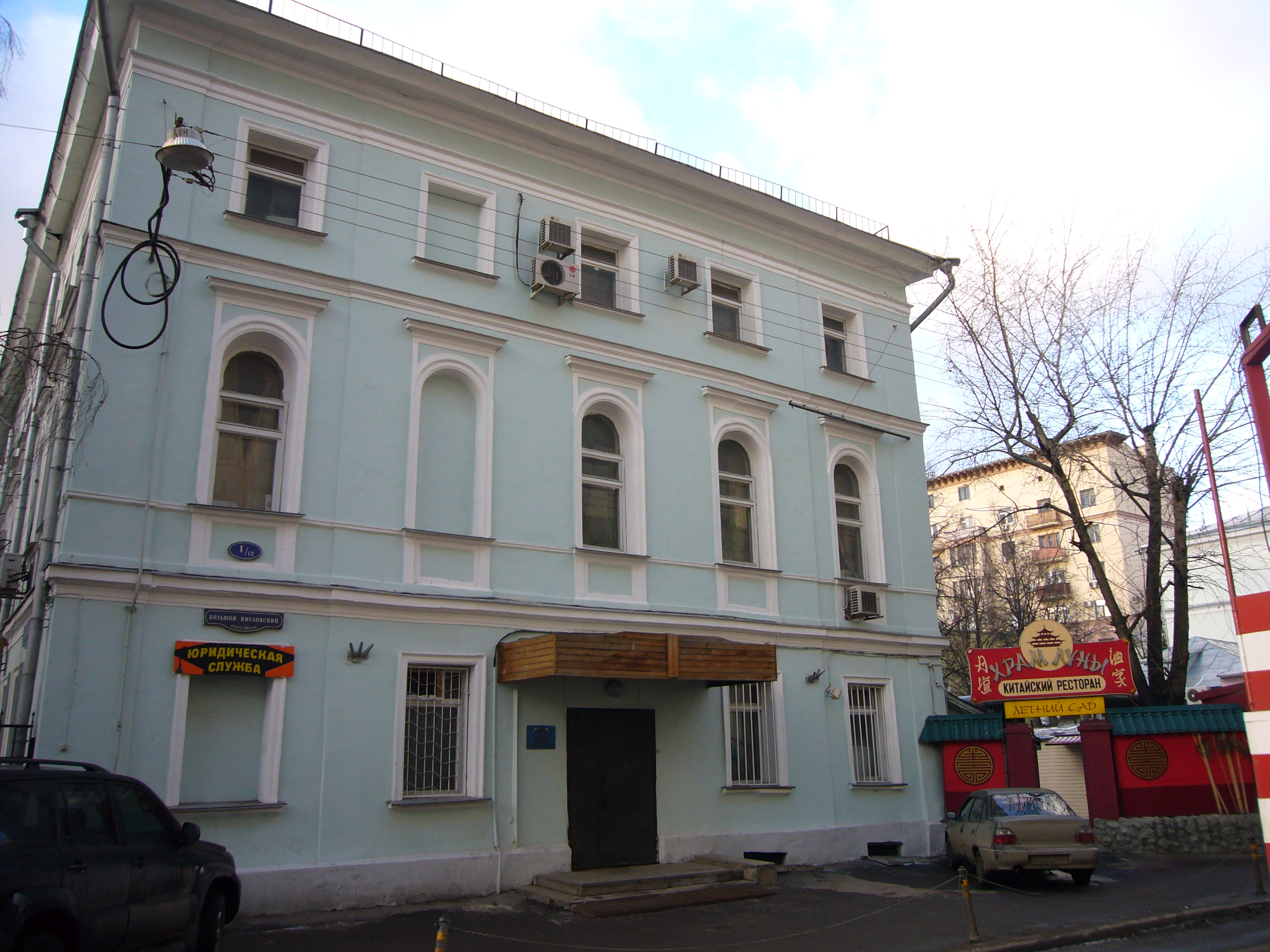
The building of the Institute of Linguistics on Bolshoi Kislovsky lane, Moscow

The Institute of Linguistics of the Russian Academy of Sciences (Russian: Институт языкознания Российской академии наук, romanized: Institut yazykoznaniya Rossiyskoy akademii nauk) is a structural unit in the Language and Literature Section of the History and Philology Department of the Russian Academy of Sciences. This institute is one of the major centers in the field of linguistic research in Russia, and is also a center for the Moscow School of Comparative Linguistics.

Researchers of the Institute of Linguistics are involved in the study of fundamental linguistic problems as well as in applied linguistic studies of the languages of Russia, the Commonwealth of Independent States and foreign countries too. These include Romance, Germanic, Celtic, Iranian, Turkic, Mongolian, Finno-Ugriс languages and languages of the Caucasus region, Tropical Africa and South-Eastern Asia.

Attention is paid to the problems of linguistic typology and comparative and historical linguistics. Much attention is given to the research of psycholinguistic and sociolinguistic problems (language situation, language policy, language conflicts) in different regions of the world.

== History ==
The Institute of Linguistics of the USSR Academy of Sciences was created in 1950 in Moscow after the so-called "discussion of linguistic issues" during the campaign against Marrism (Japhetic theory). The institute was organized on the basis of the Institute of the Russian Language of the Academy of Sciences, established in 1944, as a "counterweight" to the Marr Institute of Language and Mind in Leningrad, the leading center of theoretical language studies in the USSR of that period. The latter in 1952 was reorganized as the Leningrad branch of the Moscow Institute of Linguistics (this situation continued until 1991, when the Leningrad branch was transformed into an independent Institute for Linguistic Studies of the Russian Academy of Sciences).

On June 19, 2012, Vladimir Alpatov became the director of the Institute of Linguistics, as elected by general meeting of all the researchers of the institute.

On May 25, 2017, Andrej Kibrik was elected the director of the Institute of Linguistics by the general meeting of the researchers.

== Administration ==
The institute is headed by:

- Director of the institute — Prof. Andrej Aleksandrovich Kibrik
- Deputy director for science — Andrej Vladimirovich Sideltsev, PhD
- Deputy director for science — Andrey Boleslavovich Shluinsky, PhD
- Deputy director for general issues — Victor Nikolaevich Perley
- Scientific secretary — Vladimir Ilyich Karpov, PhD

== Structure ==
The structure of the scientific divisions of the Institute includes one research center, 8 research departments, a department for international relations, and a department for scientific personnel training. In 2002, a department of foreign languages has been included in the structure of the institute. In 2012, the psycholinguistics sector was transformed into the department of psycholinguistics comprising the general psycholinguistics sector and the ethnopsycholinguistics sector.

The institute's subdivisions:

- Research center for national languages and relations
- Department of Theoretical and Applied linguistics
  - Theoretical linguistics sector
  - Applied linguistics sector
- Typology and areal linguistics department
  - Typology sector
  - Areal linguistics sector
- Sector of general comparative-historical studies
- Department of experimental speech studies
- Department of Psycholinguistics
  - General psycholinguistics sector
  - Sector of ethnopsycholinguistics
- Department of Indo-European languages
  - Sector of Germanic languages
  - Sector of Romance languages
  - Sector of Iranian languages
  - Group of Anatolian and Celtic languages
- Department of Uralic and Altaic languages
  - Sector of Finno-Ugric languages
- Department of Caucasian languages
  - Group for production of the Linguistic Atlas of Europe
- Department of Southeast Asian languages
- Department of African languages
- Department of foreign languages
- Department for scientific personnel training

== Directions of scientific research ==
The institute's directions of research include:

- Theory of language, linguistic typology and comparative-historical linguistics
- Description of the languages of the world, including rare and endangered languages
- Areal linguistics
- Sociolinguistics
- Ethnolinguistics
- Psycholinguistics
- History of literary languages
- Computational linguistics
- Lexicography
- Logical analysis of the language
- Experimental phonetics and semantics
- Translation theory

== Projects ==
Researchers of the institute are involved in the preparation of a multi-volume encyclopaedia, Languages of the World, 14 volumes of which have already been published.

Joint international research is conducted in cooperation with scientific institutions of France, the US, Canada, Spain, Germany, Vietnam, and other countries.

Scientists of the Institute of Linguistics of the Russian Academy of Sciences have created the Linguistic Encyclopedic Dictionary, the first edition of which was published in 1990 with Viktoria Yartseva as the chief editor. The second edition was published in 2002.

== See also ==
- Institute for Linguistic Studies
- Moscow School of Comparative Linguistics
- Evolution of Human Languages
