= Vinogradov Institute of Russian Language =

Russian research institute

Coordinates: 55.7451°N 37.6029°E

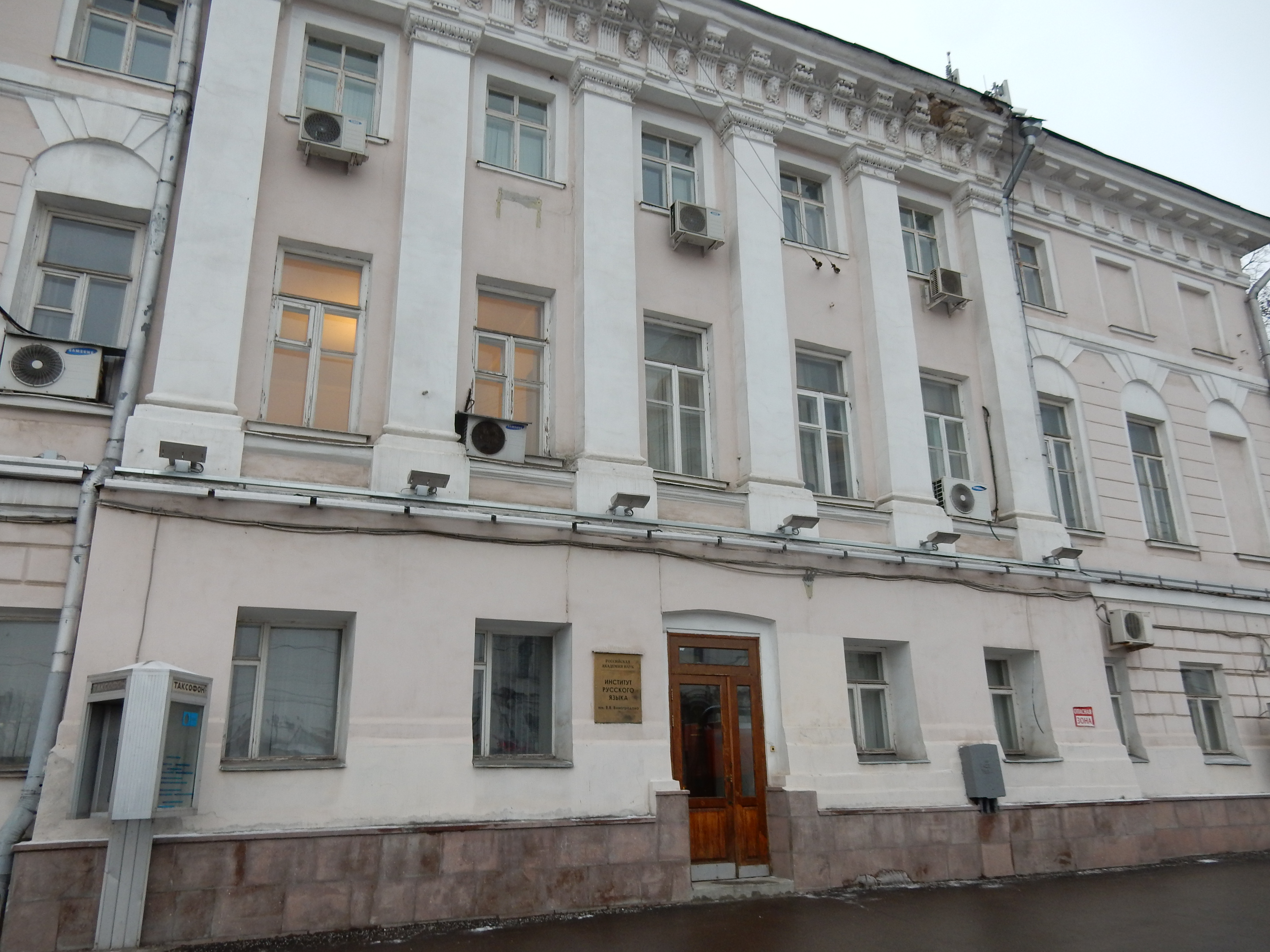
The building of the Russian Language Institute in Volkhonka Street, Moscow

The V.V. Vinogradov Russian Language Institute of the Russian Academy of Sciences (Russian: Институт русского языка имени В. В. Виноградова РАН) is the language regulator of the Russian language. It is based in Moscow and it is part of the Russian Academy of Sciences. It was founded in 1944 and is named after Viktor Vinogradov. In 1950 it was merged with the N.Ya.Marr Institute of Language and Mind and became the Institute of Linguistics of the Russian Academy of Sciences, but in 1958 it was re-established. Its activities include assessment of speech innovations in comparison to speech norms and codification of the language in Russian literature. Their output from these endeavors has included dictionaries, monographs, computer collections and databases, as well as a large historical Russian music library. They also provide a reference service of the Russian language. The Institute publishes thirteen academic journals. In addition, the Institute published 22 scholarly books in 2013 and 27 in 2012, with many more in previous years.

== Academic journals, yearbooks, and periodicals ==
The Russian Language Institute publishes or co-publishes several academic journals and periodicals: (Note: Most English language titles were approximated using Google Translate. English titles provided by the publisher are marked with an asterisk. (*))

=== The Russian Language in a Scientific Light ===
The Russian Language in a Scientific Light (Russian: Русский язык в научном освещении) is a biannual peer-reviewed research journal co-published with the Languages of Slavic Cultures since 2001. The European Reference Index for the Humanities and Social Sciences (ERIH) approved the journal in 2011 according to ERIH criteria. The journal's page on the Russian Language Institute's website claims a category "B" ranking from ERIH. Issues of the journal that are at least two years old are available in full print from that same website. (Note: The current ERICH system was transferred to the Norwegian Social Science Data Services in 2014 and renamed ERIH PLUS. Rankings under ERIH were established under ERICH when it was run by the European Science Foundation (ESF) and included only humanities journals and different criteria for inclusion. Therefore, ERIH rankings are not reflected under the ERIH PLUS system, only the basic journal data.)

=== Russian Speech ===
Russian Speech (Russian Русская речь) is a semimonthly popular science magazine of the Russian language, co-published with the Russian Cultural Foundation. Publication began in 1967 and continues to the present. Back issues are available free on the magazine's website.

=== Problems of Onomastics ===
Problems of Onomastics (alternatively Questions of Onomastics, Russian Вопросы ономастики) is a biannual peer-reviewed academic journal that covers onomastics. It has been co-published by the Ural University Press and the Russian Language Institute since 2004 and continues an eponymous periodical collection of articles, Problems of Onomastics, originally titled Problems of Toponomastics until 1972, edited in Sverdlovsk from 1962 to 1991. All issues from the previous incarnation and older back issues from the current Problems of Onomastics are available at the journal's website.

=== Problems of Linguistics ===
Problems of Linguistics (Russian Вопросы языкознания) has been in publication as a semimonthly academic journal since 1952 by the Department of Historical and Philological Sciences and the Russian Language Institute of the Russian Academy of Sciences. According to the publisher's page, the journal is peer-reviewed and listed in the Russian Citation Index, SCOPUS, and "has the highest category [INT1] rating of the European Reference Index for the Humanities (ERIH)."

=== Proceedings of the Russian Academy of Sciences. A Series of Literature and Language ===
Proceedings of the Russian Academy of Sciences. A Series of Literature and Language (Russian Известия Российской Академии наук. Серия литературы и языка) was first published during Imperial Russia from 1852 through 1863, and then following a 33-year pause, publication was resumed in 1896 and continued uninterrupted throughout the revolutions of 1917, spanning the entire Soviet era. It continues to be published as of August, 2014, though the journal name has changed several times, as has the governing authority responsible for publication oversight. Beginning with volume 10, spanning the period of 1861 through 1863, all issues are available on the journal's website, scanned from the originals, through 1998, volume 7. Current issues can be accessed through the National Academy of Sciences "Russian Literature and Folklore" (ESF) online database.

==== History of names of the journal ====
1852-1863 Proceedings of the Imperial Academy of Sciences in the Department of Russian Language and Literature
1896-1916 Proceedings of the Department of Russian Language and Literature of the Imperial Academy of Sciences
1917-1927 Proceedings of the Department of Russian Language and Literature of the Russian Academy of Sciences
1928-1930 Proceedings of the Russian language and literature
1928-1938 Proceedings of the Academy of Sciences of the USSR. Department of Social Sciences
1940-1963 Proceedings of the Academy of Sciences of the USSR. Department of Literature and Language
1963-1991 Proceedings of the Academy of Sciences of the USSR. A series of literature and language
1992 -... Proceedings of the Russian Academy of Sciences. A series of literature and language

=== Etymology ===
Etymology (Russian Этимология) is a yearbook representing the body of articles published on the website etymolog.ruslang.ru, a website belonging to the publisher.

=== The Slavic Linguistic Atlas ===
The Slavic Linguistic Atlas (Russian Общеславянский лингвистический атлас) represents ongoing work, beginning in 1958, with several periodic progress reports being issued over the following decades. The Atlas is an ongoing publication, with continuous updates, issued in two series: the first covers vocabulary, word-formation, and semantics, while the second covers grammar, phonetics and phonology. Updates are issued as books and monographs as research dictates. All materials are available online at the publisher's website.

=== Linguistic Chronology and History of the Russian language ===
Linguistic Chronology and History of the Russian language (Russian Лингвистическое источниковедение и история русского языка) is a research journal, issued every one to three years, beginning in 2000. Fourteen antecedent issues had been issued under various names during the Soviet era, from 1963 through 1991. All issues are available online at the publisher's website.

=== Other yearbooks and periodicals ===
- Problems of Phonetics (Проблемы фонетики)
- The Russian Language Today (Русский язык сегодня)
- Cultural Issues of Speech (Вопросы культуры речи)
- Slavic Verse (Славянский стих)
- Materials and Research on Russian Dialects (Материалы и исследования по русской диалектологии)

== See also ==
- The A.S. Pushkin State Russian Language Institute (Государственный институт русского языка имени А. С. Пушкина), which is primarily an educational institution in the field of Russian as a foreign language
- Institute of Linguistics of the Russian Academy of Sciences
- Institute for Linguistic Studies of the Russian Academy of Sciences
- Institute for Slavic Studies of the Russian Academy of Sciences
- Russian Academy, which played the language regulator role in 1784-1841
- International Russian Language Organisation
