= Avtonomov =

Avtonomov (Russian: Автоно́мов; masculine) or Avtonomova (Автоно́мова; feminine) is a Russian last name. Variants of this surname include Avnatamov/Avnatamova (Авната́мов/Авната́мова), Avtamonov/Avtamonova (Автамо́нов/Автамо́нова), Avtomanov/Avtomanova (Автома́нов/Автома́нова), Avtoneyev/Avtoneyeva (Автоне́ев/Автоне́ева), Avtonoshkin/Avtonoshkina (Автоно́шкин/Автоно́шкина), and Antomanov/Antomanova (Антома́нов/Антома́нова).

All these surnames derive from patronymics which themselves derive from various forms of the male first name Avtonom (from Greek autonomos, meaning one that has/is living by one's own laws). The following people bear this surname:

- Alexei Ivanovich Avtonomov (1890–1919), Russian Red military commander
- Alexei Stanislavovich Avtonomov (born 1959), Russian legal scholar
- Darya Avtonomova, Russian gymnast, a medalist in the Senior Group Finals at the 2014 Rhythmic Gymnastics European Championships
- Nikolai Avtonomov (1894–1979), Russian-American Orthodox clergyman who converted to Eastern Catholicism

== See also ==
- Kozma Spassky-Avtonomov (1807–1890), Russian geographer and climatologist
