= Vinokur =

Vinokur is an East Slavic-language occupational surname. The word "винокур" is an archaic name of the profession of spirit distilling.

The name may also be transliterated via German/Yiddish as Winokur or via French as Vinocour or Winocour.

== People ==
=== Vinokur ===
- Grigoriy Vinokur (1896–1947), Russian linguist
- Ion Vinokur (1930–2006), Ukrainian archaeologist
- Jeffrey Vinokur (born 1990), American science educator and performer
- Tania Vinokur (born 1982), Israeli violinist
- Valerii Vinokur (1949–2025), Russian-American physicist
- Vladimir Vinokur (born 1948), Russian actor and comedian

=== Other forms ===
- Alice Winocour (born 1976), French screenwriter and director
- Lev Vinocour (born 1970), Russian pianist
- Yaroslav Vynokur (born 1974), billiards player

== See also ==
- Vinokurov
