= Georgy Chelpanov =

Ukrainian and Russian philosopher and psychologist

- Георгий Челпанов
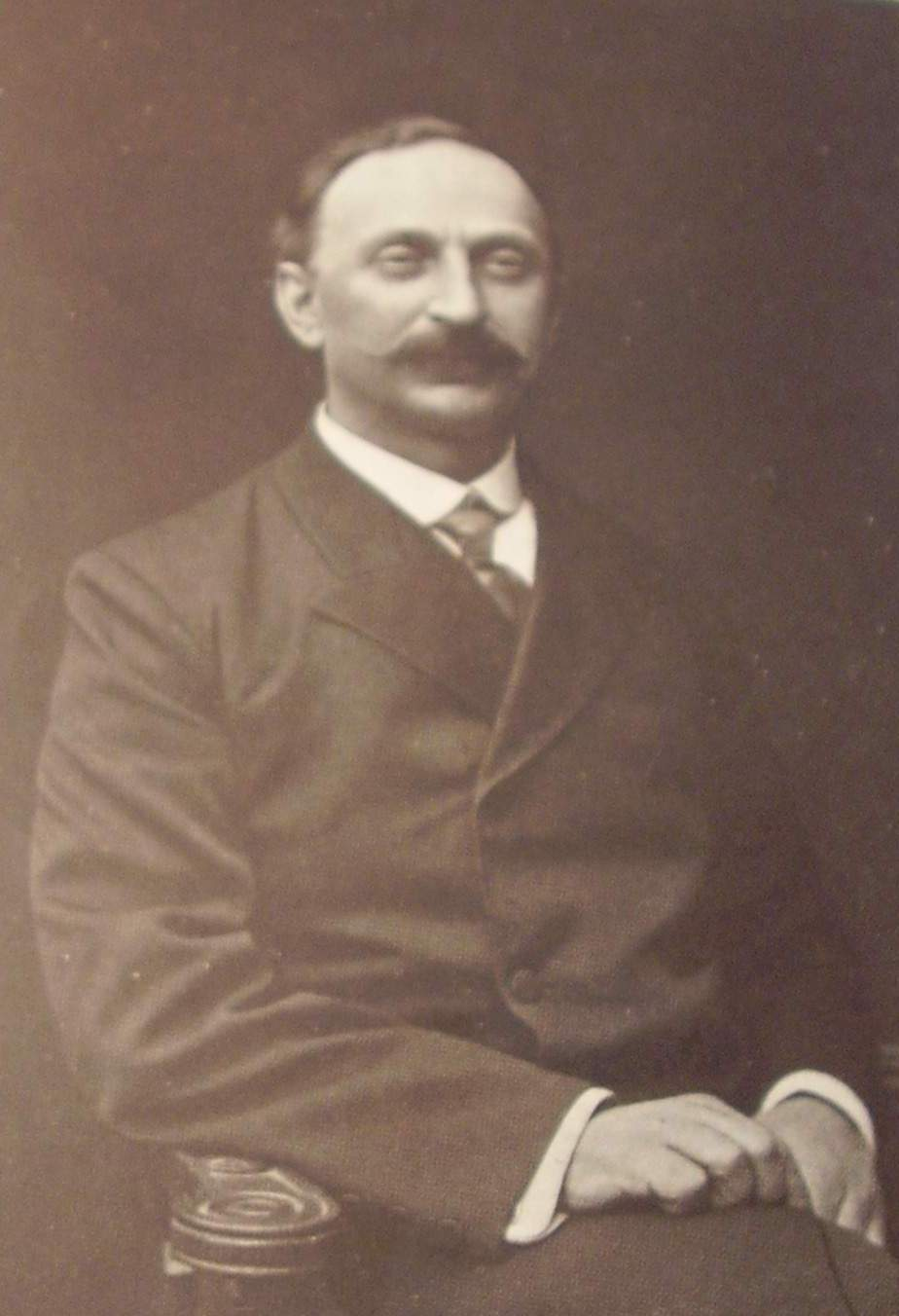
- Chelpanov in 1914
- Born: April 28, 1862; Mariupol, Yekaterinoslav Governorate, Russian Empire
- Died: February 16, 1936 (aged 73); Moscow, Russian SFSR, Soviet Union
- Education: Gymnasium Alexandrinum (Mariupol)
- Alma mater: Novorossiysk University
- Scientific career
- Fields: Psychology; logic; physiology
- Institutions: Imperial University of St Vladimir; Moscow State University
- Doctoral advisor: Lev Lopatin
- Doctoral students: Gustav Shpet; Pavel Blonsky

Georgy Ivanovich Chelpanov (Russian: Георгий Иванович Челпанов; 28 April [O.S. 16 April] 1862 – 13 February 1936) was a Russian Imperial and Soviet psychologist, philosopher and logician.

== Biography ==
Chelpanov was born in Mariupol in to an upper-class family of Greek origin.

Chelpanov received his primary education in Mariupol at the local parish school, and then studied at the Gymnasium Alexandrinum (Mariupol), graduating in 1883 with a gold medal. After graduating from the gymnasium, he entered the Faculty of History and Philology of the Novorossiysk University in Odessa and graduated in 1887 with a Ph.D.

From January 1891 he began teaching at the Department of Philosophy at Moscow University as a Privatdozent. In February 1892 he moved to the Kiev University of St. Vladimir. In November 1896 he defended his dissertation “The problem of perception of space in connection with the doctrine of a priori and innateness”, which was inspired by the works of Nikolai Grot and Lev Lopatin and was awarded the degree of Master of Philosophy by the Faculty of History and Philology of Moscow University. In May 1897 he was appointed acting extraordinary professor of the university in the department of philosophy, which he headed until 1906; in July 1904 he was approved as an ordinary professor. Since 1897, Chelpanov also led the Psychological Seminary at Kiev University.

He wrote articles on psychology in the journals Russkaya mysl, "Problems of Philosophy and Psychology", "The World of God" and in "Kiev University News. Chelpanov published reviews of the latest literature on psychology, epistemology, and Kant's transcendental aesthetics.

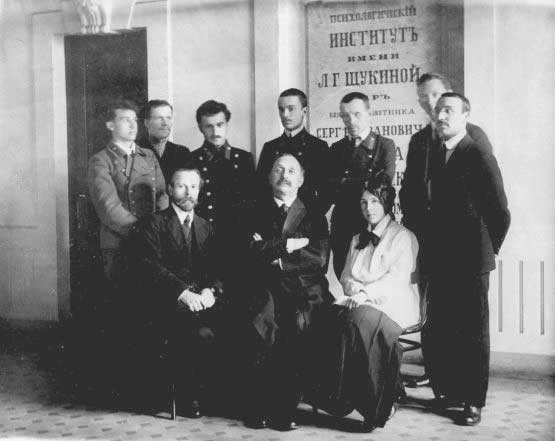
Chelpanov among students, 1914

From 1907 he was an ordinary professor at the Department of Philosophy at Moscow University. Already in 1912, Chelpanov began to conduct psychological seminars in the building of the newly built institute, and in March 1914, the grand opening of the Psychological Institute named after his wife L. G. Schukina.

He also taught at the Moscow Higher Women's Courses, the Pedagogical Institute of P. G. Shelaputin and the Moscow Commercial Institute.

In 1919 he was dean of the Faculty of History and Philology, and then a professor of the Department of Philosophy of the Faculty of Social Sciences at the Moscow State University from 1921 to 1923.

From the beginning of the mid 1920s and the introduction of Marxist psychology by Konstantin Kornilov and Pavel Blonsky, Chelpanov's methods were dismissed as idealist. This alongside his negative attitude to the requirement to rebuild psychology on the basis of Marxism, led to his resignation of the position of director of the Psychological Institute. He continued to work as teacher in the Academy of Artistic Sciences with the help of Gustav Shpet, until the Academy was closed.

Chelpanov died on February 13, 1936, and was buried at the Vagankovo Cemetery.

== Views ==
In the philosophical works of Chelpanov, the ideas of Berkeley, Hume and Spinoza are noticeable. In his psychological research, the theories of Nikolai Grot, Lev Lopatin, Wilhelm Wundt and Carl Stumpf had a significant influence on him. Wundt's principle of "empirical parallelism" formed the basis of Chelpanov's criticism of monism (the theory according to which different types of being or substance are ultimately reduced to a single principle) in psychology and philosophy.

Mental and physical, according to Chelpanov, in principle cannot be identified and do not determine each other. The thesis about the independence (parallelism) of physical and mental processes meant for him the recognition of a special subject of research: "the mental is explained only from the mental." The affirmed “dualism” had its limits: the independence of mental and physical phenomena does not exclude their ontological unity, since they can be an expression of a single whole, a single substance (“neo-Spinozism”). Chelpanov's epistemological views ("transcendental realism") generally corresponded to the principles of the neo-Kantian theory of knowledge. He stood on the principles of apriorism in general philosophical constructions and in substantiating the foundations of psychological science. At the center of his epistemology is the problem of the “thing in itself” (“something”).

Chelpanov singled out different types and levels of psychological knowledge: experimental psychology, which studies the simplest psychophysiological functions (in the spirit of Wundt's "physiological psychology" method); empirical psychology, the subject of which is mental phenomena; theoretical psychology, which studies the general laws of the spirit. Conducted experiments on the perception of space and time, developed methods of laboratory research (Introduction to experimental psychology, 1915).

Chelpanov understood logical laws as the result of observation of thought processes, which a person receives by revealing the mechanism of his own thinking (at the same time abstracting from the content of thoughts). Laws are formal and universal; they are ideal norms of thought applicable to our concepts of things (but not to them themselves). The fundamental law is the law of contradiction.

Chelpanov recognizes the possibility of law and patterns in history (unlike most neo-Kantians), but understands them as a manifestation of the laws of human will, as an expression of general psychological laws.

Chelpanov was close to the idea of the union of psychology and philosophy (the idea of “philosophical” psychology). However during the Soviet era, when this union turned into a dictate of Marxist ideology, he emphasized the predominantly empirical and experimental nature of psychology as a science, and considered Marxism only applicable in the field of social psychology.
