= Kornilov =

Kornilov (Russian: Корни́лов) and Kornilova (feminine; Корни́лова) is a common Russian surname derived from the baptismal name Kornil (Latin: Cornelius). Notable people with this surname include:

- Aleksandr Kornilov (1862–1925), Russian historian and politician
- Aleksandr Kornilov (born 1985), Russian Olympic rower
- Boris Kornilov (1907–1938), Soviet poet
- Denis Kornilov (born 1986), Russian ski jumper
- Ivan Kornilov (1899–1953), Soviet general
- Konstantin Kornilov (1879–1957), Soviet psychologist
- Lavr Kornilov (1870–1918), Russian general and one of the leaders of the White Movement
- Lev Kornilov (born 1984), Russian professional footballer
- Roman Kornilov (born 1981), Kyrgyzstani football player
- Sergey Kornilov (born 1978), Russian Olympic speedskater
- Taisia Kornilova (born 1961), Soviet and Russian circus performer, elephant trainer and People's Artist of Russia
- Vladimir Alexeyevich Kornilov (1806–1854), Russian admiral, killed during the Battle of Malakoff
- Yevgeni Kornilov (born 1985), Russian football player
- Zoya Kornilova (1939–2025), Russian politician

== See also ==
- Russian cruiser Admiral Kornilov (1887)
- Russian cruiser Ochakov (1902), renamed to Admiral Kornilov in 1919
- Kornilov Affair
