= Alexey Avtonomov =

Alexei Avtonomov may refer to:

- Alexei Ivanovich Avtonomov (1890–1919), Russian Red military commander
- Alexei Stanislavovich Avtonomov (born 1959), Russian legal scholar
