= Filipp Fortunatov =

Russian philologist (1848–1914)

Filipp Fyodorovich Fortunatov
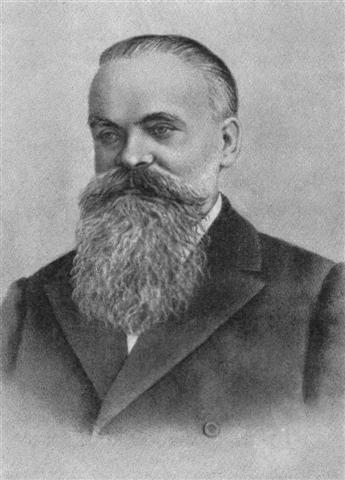
- Born: 14 January 1848; Vologda, Russian Empire
- Died: 3 October 1914 (aged 66); Kosalma, Russian Empire
- Burial place: Kosalma, Russian Empire; 62°1′12″N 34°7′12″E
- Education: Imperial Moscow University
- Occupation: Philologist
- Employer(s): Imperial Moscow University; St. Petersburg Academy of Sciences
- Organization: Moscow linguistic circle
- Known for: Fortunatov–de Saussure's law; Fortunatov's law
- Spouse: Yulia Ivanovna

Filipp Fyodorovich Fortunatov (Russian: Фили́пп Фёдорович Фортуна́тов; 14 January [O.S. 2 January] 1848 – 3 October [O.S. 20 September] 1914) was a Russian philologist, Indo-Europeanist and Slavist, best known for establishing the Fortunatov–de Saussure law.

== Biography ==
Fortunatov was born in Vologda in 1848. His father was the director of public schools in Olonets Governorate, and Fortunatov entered the Olonets provincial male gymnasium in Petrozavodsk, which was also overseen by his father.

Following his father's retirement in 1863, the family moved to Moscow, where Fortunatov continued his studies at the 2nd Moscow Gymnasium. Fortunatov then entered the Faculty of History and Philology of Imperial Moscow University in 1864. During his time at the university, Fortunatov was influenced by Fyodor Buslaev and his works on comparative linguistics. He graduated in 1868. In 1871, Fortunatov and Vsevolod Miller travelled to Suwałki Governorate, where they studied Lithuanian fairy tales and songs. After this trip, Fortunatov was sent abroad to Germany, France and England, spending two years abroad in total between 1871 and 1873. During the trip, Fortunatov attended lectures and also studied the Vedas at the British Museum. After his return to Moscow, Fortunatov completed his Master's degree in 1875.

From 1876 onwards, Fortunatov began lecturing in the university. In 1884, Fortunatov was made a part-time professor in the faculty at the Department of Comparative Linguistics and Sanskrit Language, and was promoted to a full-time professor two years later.

While working at the Imperial Moscow University, Fortunatov became involved as a corresponding member in the Department of Russian Language and Literature of the St. Petersburg Academy of Sciences in 1895. By 1898, Fortunatov's studies had attracted him attention and fame, and he was offered honorary doctorate degrees in Comparative Linguistics by both the Imperial Moscow University and the University of Kiev, and also elected as an academician at the St. Petersburg Academy of Sciences.

During his tenure at the Imperial Moscow University, Fortunatov was made honorary professor in 1900 and an honorary member in 1902. In 1902, Fortunatov left Imperial Moscow University and moved to St. Petersburg, working at the St. Petersburg Academy of Sciences as a full-time academician. In 1904, Fortunatov headed a commission responsible for publishing recommendations regarding a Russian orthography reform, though the reform was shelved due to the Russo-Japanese War and 1905 Russian Revolution. In 1912, Fortunatov was made a member of the Board of the St. Petersburg Academy of Sciences.

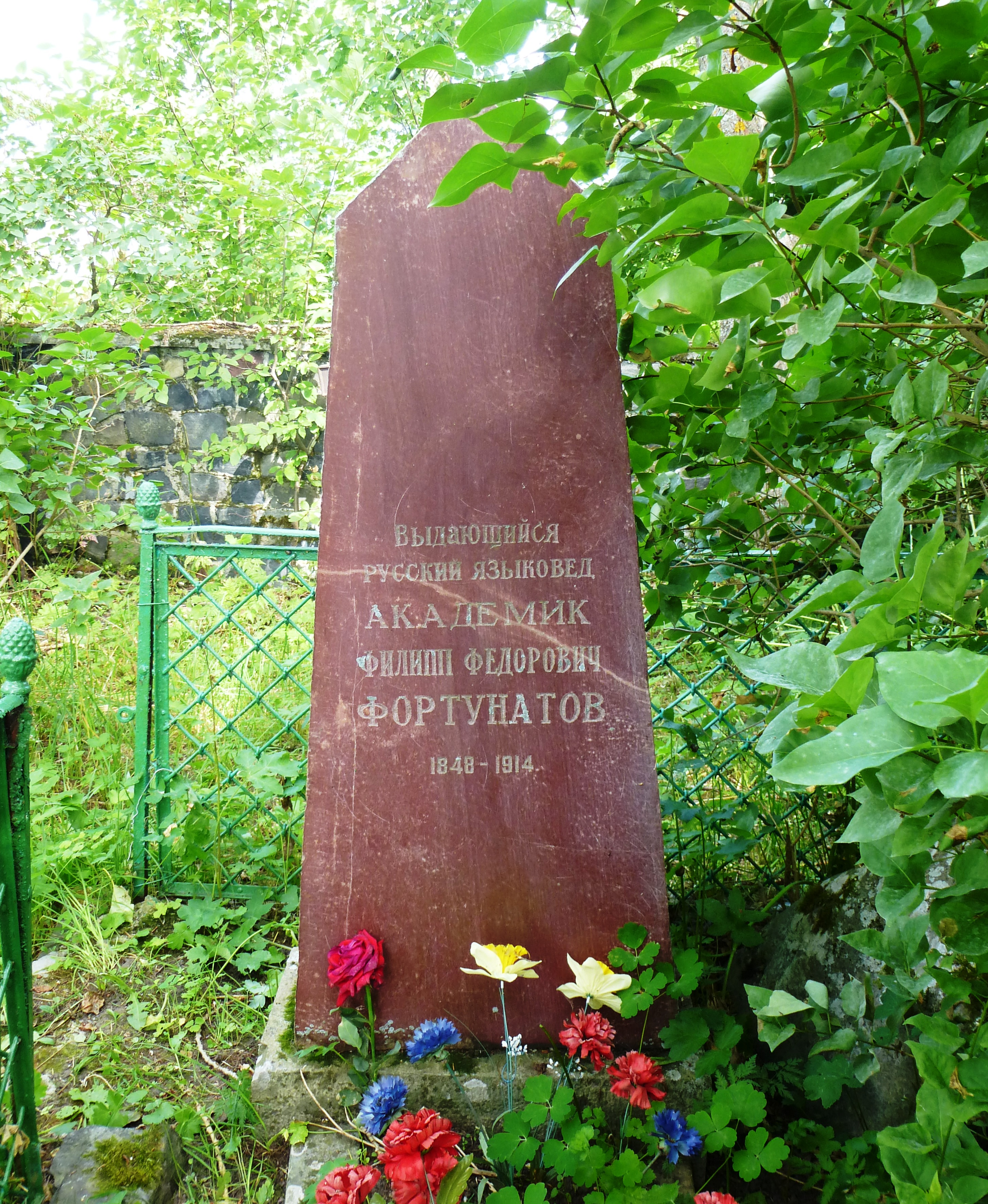
Fortunatov's grave in Kosalma

In the final decades of his life, Fortunatov and his wife frequently spent their summers in their dacha in Kosalma, a village about 40 km (25 mi) from Petrozavodsk. On 3 October 1914, after returning to his dacha from a short walk, Fortunatov fell ill on his bed and died several hours later. He was buried in a local cemetery. Fortunatov's wife, Yulia Ivanovna, remained in Kosalma until her death in 1921, and was buried in the same cemetery.

== Contributions ==
Fortunatov was the founder of the Moscow linguistic circle, and the foremost representative of the Neogrammarian school in Russia. His studies specialized in the phonetics of the Indo-European languages, emphasizing the importance of using a strict historical approach in studying phonetic changes. His works included studies on the Slavic languages, Sanskrit, Vedic Sanskrit, Greek, Armenian, Gothic and Lithuanian. Through the Moscow linguistic circle, Fortunatov had immense influence on the subsequent generation of Russian and foreign linguists, producing distinguished students like Aleksey Shakhmatov, Dmitry Ushakov, Nikolai Durnovo, Olaf Broch, Aleksandar Belić, Mikhail Pokrovsky, Johan August Lundell, Jiří Polívka and J. J. Mikkola. However, his international impact remained small due to his limited written works.

In 1895, Fortunatov published On Stress and Length in the Baltic Languages, where he established a law, now known as Fortunatov–de Saussure's law, related to stress shift in the Baltic and Slavic languages. A street in Petrozavodsk is also named after Fortunatov.
