= Taisia =

Taisia (Russian: Таисия) is a Russian feminine given name. Notable people with the name include:

- Taisia Afonina (1913–1994), Soviet painter
- Taisia Chenchik (1936–2013), Soviet high jumper
- Taisia Kornilova (born 1961), Russian circus performer
- Taisia Korotkova (born 1980), Russian artist
- Taisiia Onofriichuk (born 2008), Ukrainian rhythmic gymnast
- Taisia Povaliy (born 1964), Russian singer
