= Pedology (disambiguation) =

Pedology is the study of soils in their natural environment.

Pedology may also refer to:

- Paedology or pedology, the study of child behavior and development

== See also ==
- Podology or podiatry, the study of feet
- Pedophilia, sexual attraction to prepubescent children
- Pediatrics or pediatry, the study of children's health and medicine
- Pedometry, the use of pedometers
- Pedagogy, the theory and practice of learning
- Penology, the study of the repression of criminals
- Pelology, the study of therapeutic mud
