= Filler episode =

Type of television episode

A schematic of a filler episode in relation to the plot of a television series

A filler episode (Note: also known as a stand-alone episode, beach episode, or Netflix bloat) is an episode in a television series that does not progress the plot of the series. Filler episodes typically serve as filler to the overall plot, but may serve several purposes in a series; instead of focusing on the plot of a series, a filler episode may focus on the development of the characters. While not inherently "bad", they are often received negatively by viewers. Filler episodes are created for a number of reasons, depending on the series; they can be used to adjust the overall plot, or to lengthen the series. Filler episodes are common in anime, and are frequently associated with the medium. Several consecutive filler episodes in an anime can construct a filler arc.

== Definition and use ==
What is considered a filler episode is subjective, as it does not have a fixed meaning. A broad definition of a filler episode is one that does not progress the plot or narrative arc present in a television series, and focuses on the characters within a series; the episode serves as filler to the plot. Filler episodes can have various effects to the overall plot, such as accelerating, decelerating, or otherwise complicating the plot. Due to their nature, filler episodes are sometimes referred to as "stand-alone" episodes. Some genres do not use filler episodes at all; television dramas typically use filler in individual scenes, as opposed to entire episodes.

While filler episodes in general are not inherently "a bad thing", they are commonly received with initial negative reactions by viewers. In the practice of binge-watching, filler episodes are sometimes not watched at all, in favor of only episodes which progress the plot. Filler episodes in television series created by Netflix have been received negatively, being regarded as "padding out" the series and "overstay[ing] their 'natural' welcome". Such episodes have contributed to a phenomenon known as "Netflix bloat". Filler episodes are less common for series hosted on subscription video on-demand services, as the overall length of a series's season is reduced to allow for more individual series on a service.

In comparison to other narrative structures, the narratives of television series allow for prolonged periods of character development. Filler episodes allow for character development without progressing the plot, which can be used to aid the viewer in establishing an emotional connection with the characters. Series such as ER and The West Wing feature episodes in which the development of a character is the overall plot. Theorists of Russian formalism such as Vladimir Propp and Boris Tomashevsky suggest that character development is unimportant, and that characters should only be used to serve a function in the plot; the purpose of a character is "what the character did in the [plot], not who they were [emphasis in original]." Film critic Seymour Chatman argues that "plot and character are equally important", as viewers depict characters beyond their function in the plot; viewers interpret the characters and their emotions as though they are real.

=== In anime ===
Filler episodes are common in anime, and the term itself is frequently associated with the medium. The amount of filler episodes in an anime vary from single, "one-off" episodes to several consecutive episodes; the latter can construct an entire arc of its own, which is referred to as a "filler arc". While the general definition for a filler episode applies to anime, another definition exclusive to anime is an episode which contains content not present in the manga it is based on. Filler episodes may originate when an anime is based on a manga, and both are being created at the same time. When an anime outpaces the manga it is based on, filler episodes—usually composed of original content not present in the manga—are created in between manga issues.

Filler episodes in anime are also used for character development, such as relationships between characters. Propp's theories have also been used to analyze plots used in manga and anime based on manga. Media theorists such as Eiji Ōtsuka and Yasuki Hamano have suggested that the characters of an anime cannot be separated from the plot. Hamano further explained that the characters usually precede the creation of a plot, and determine the plots of new episodes.

One type of filler episode common in anime is a "beach episode", in which the setting is a beach, swimming pool, or lake. Beach episodes are often considered a trope in anime, allowing for "breathing room" before the plot progresses and becomes more "intense". Crunchyroll News writer Daniel Dockery had compared the purpose of beach episodes to the concept of escapism. In addition, beach episodes typically have instances of fan service; for example, such episodes depict characters in swimwear, and contain close-up shots of a character's chest, legs, or buttocks.

One example of a filler episode is the 125th episode of Dragon Ball Z, in which the characters Goku and Piccolo work together to obtain a driver's license; the events in the episode do not occur in the manga, and the episode does not progress the plot of the series. An extreme example of filler episodes is Dekoboko Friends, a children's anime that aired between episodes of Okaasan to Issho. The episodes were approximately thirty seconds long, and no general plot progressed throughout the series. Any plot was exclusive to the episode, and was derived directly from the actions of the characters. Other anime known to have several filler episodes are Sailor Moon, One Piece, and Naruto. The website Anime Filler List identifies episodes in anime regarded as filler episodes.

== See also ==
- Bottle episode—an episode of a television series created to use as few resources as possible
- Clip show—an episode consisting primarily of reused scenes from previous episodes
- Villain of the week—a villain that appears in filler episodes
