= Autonom =

Autonom may refer to:

- Autonomism, a set of anti-authoritarian left-wing political and social movements
- Autonom, early Russian Orthodox Church name of the male first name Avtonom
