= Winokur =

Winokur is a Jewish surname that is a spelling variant or Germanized variant of the East Slavic surname Vinokur. It may refer to:

- Brandon Winokur (born 2004), American baseball player
- Harry Winokur (1910–2004), American businessman and founder of the Mister Donut chain of doughnut shops
- Jon Winokur (born 1947), American writer and editor
- Marissa Jaret Winokur (born 1973), American actress

== See also ==
- Vinokur
- Vinokurov
