= Russian pyramid =

Form of pocket billiards popular in Eastern Europe

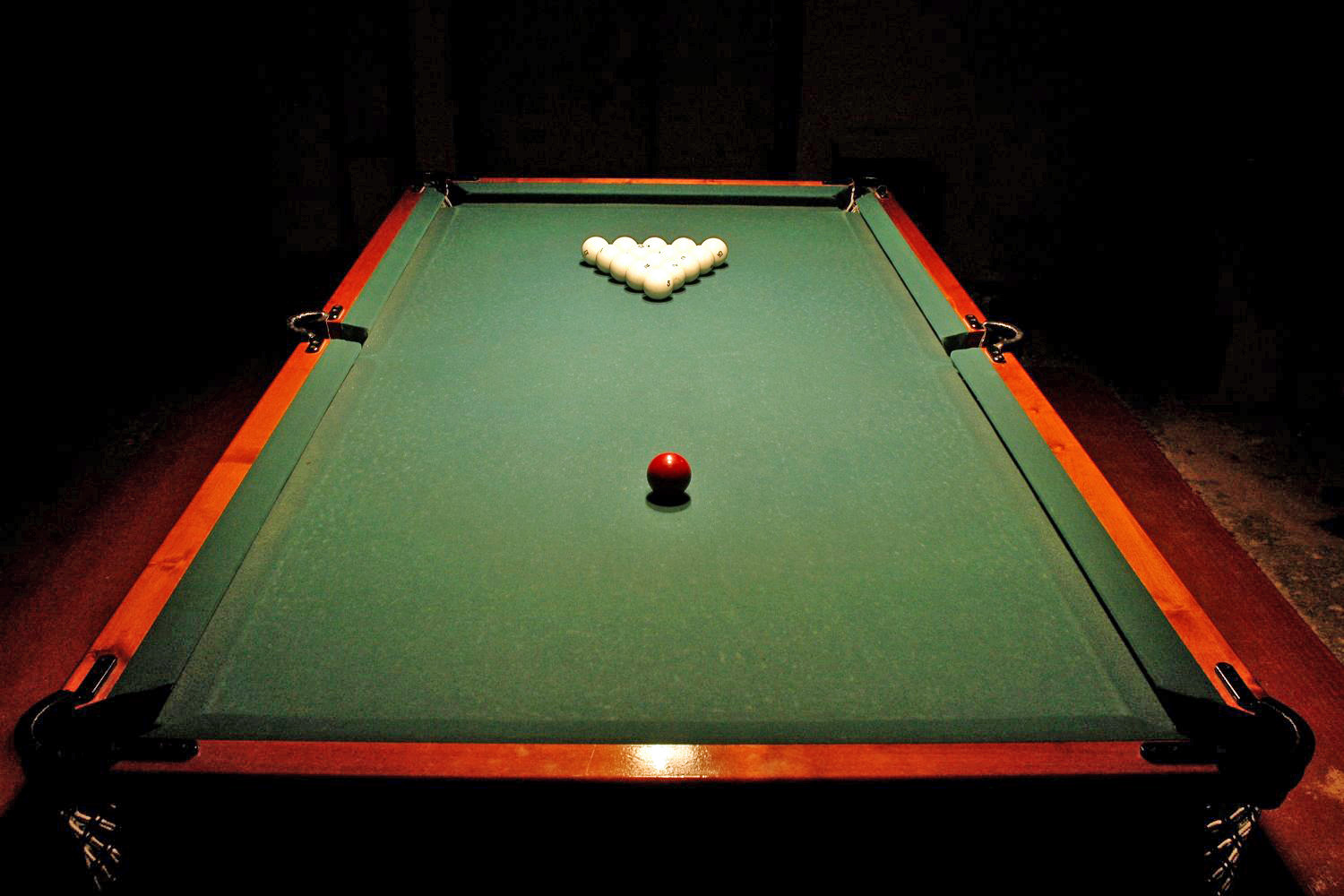
Russian pyramid game setup, with the object balls in a triangle rack at the foot of the table, and the cue ball in front of (up-table of) the head string (baulk line).

Russian pyramid, also known as Russian billiards (Russian: ру́сский билья́рд, russky bilyard), is a form of billiards played on a large billiard table with narrow pockets. It is played across Russia and several former Soviet/Eastern Bloc countries. In the West, the game is known as pyramid billiards, or simply pyramid.

== Equipment ==
- Table: Playing-surface sizes vary. The official tournament size is 12 by 6 feet (370 cm × 180 cm), the same size used for professional snooker. Smaller sizes as used by other cue sports are also found in less-formal venues. The slate used in Russian pyramid tables is typically much thinner than that of pool and snooker tables, but is occasionally heated, similar to carom billiards tables.
- Balls: There are sixteen balls, fifteen numbered object balls and a cue ball, but in contrast to pool, the numbered balls are usually white, and the cue ball is either maroon, red or yellow. They are typically larger and heavier than other types of billiard balls. The official tournament size is 67 mm (2 5/8 in) in diameter, weighing approximately 255 g (9 oz), while smaller balls – e.g., 63 mm (2 1/2 in), 60 mm (2 3/8 in), and 57.15 millimetres (2 1/4 in) (regular pool ball size) – are available for smaller table sizes. The old tournament size was 68 mm in diameter.
- Pockets: The corner pockets are only 3 mm (approx. 3/16 in) wider than the diameter of the ball, while the middle pockets are 12–13 mm (approx. 1/2–3/4 in) wider than the diameter of the ball. This requires great precision to pocket a ball in such tight pockets.
- Cues: Due to larger ball size, the cues used for Russian pyramid are slightly thicker and heavier than pool cues, and the tip diameter is wider (up to 15 mm), in comparison to 10–13 mm used in pool cues. Specialty shots like massé and jump shots are usually more difficult to perform with a Russian pyramid cue, due to its heavier nature. These shots are also not allowed in official tournaments; doing so may result in a foul.

== Rule variations ==
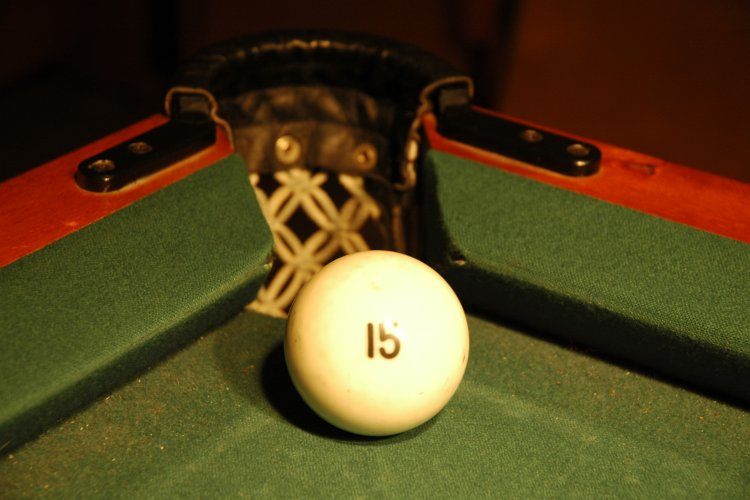
Russian pyramid ball near the corner pocket. The relative sizes of the ball and pocket make the game very challenging.

There are several rule variations of Russian pyramid. All games begin with fifteen numbered white balls racked in a pyramid pack, as in straight pool and eight-ball. Players may pocket any object balls on the table regardless of number, and the first player to pocket eight or more balls wins the frame. In addition, shots do not have to be called. Depending on the game variant, some specific balls may have to be in specific positions within the rack. The first player firmly breaks the rack with the cue ball from just in front of the baulk line. The most common varieties are the following, each of which has slight local variations on the rules:

- Free pyramid (also known as American pyramid)

Any ball may be used as the cue ball. Players can pocket the ball they struck if it hits another ball first, with the goal being to carom the struck ball off one or more other balls into a pocket. Should the struck ball be pocketed without striking any other balls, the shot is a foul, and that ball is spotted behind the baulk line.

- Dynamic pyramid (also known as Siberian pyramid or Nevsky pyramid)

Only one ball is the cue ball. Players can pocket the cue ball with a carom shot off another ball and then the scorer must choose an object ball to be taken off the table. The player then has ball-in-hand and may place it anywhere on the table but may not pocket it until the next stroke; otherwise, it is a foul.

- Combined pyramid (also known as Moscow pyramid or combo pyramid)

The rules are the same as in dynamic pyramid, except that, after the cue ball is pocketed, the cue ball is spotted between the head rail (bottom cushion) and head or baulk, but not on top of that line; from here until the next stroke, balls can be only pocketed in the side and far-corner pockets. In pool, this part of the table is called the kitchen and the Russian equivalent is дом (dom), 'house'.

- Classical pyramid

The rules are similar to fifteen-ball pool. The object is to score at least 71 points. For each correctly pocketed object ball, the player wins the number of points on the ball (except for the 1-ball, which scores 11 points). The last remaining ball on the table, regardless of its number, is worth 10 points. The total number of points is 130.

- 14.1 pyramid (also known as straight pyramid or long pyramid)

The rules are very similar to free pyramid, except that a frame continues until 14 balls are pocketed, similar to straight pool; these 14 balls are then re-spotted into an incomplete pyramid. The objective is to score at least a given number of points.

- Scratch pyramid (also known as SVOI)

Similar to free pyramid, but pocketing object balls before the cue ball is a foul; therefore, the player must pocket the cue ball after hitting object balls. Other balls can be pocketed as long as the cue ball is potted first.

== "Russian pool" ==
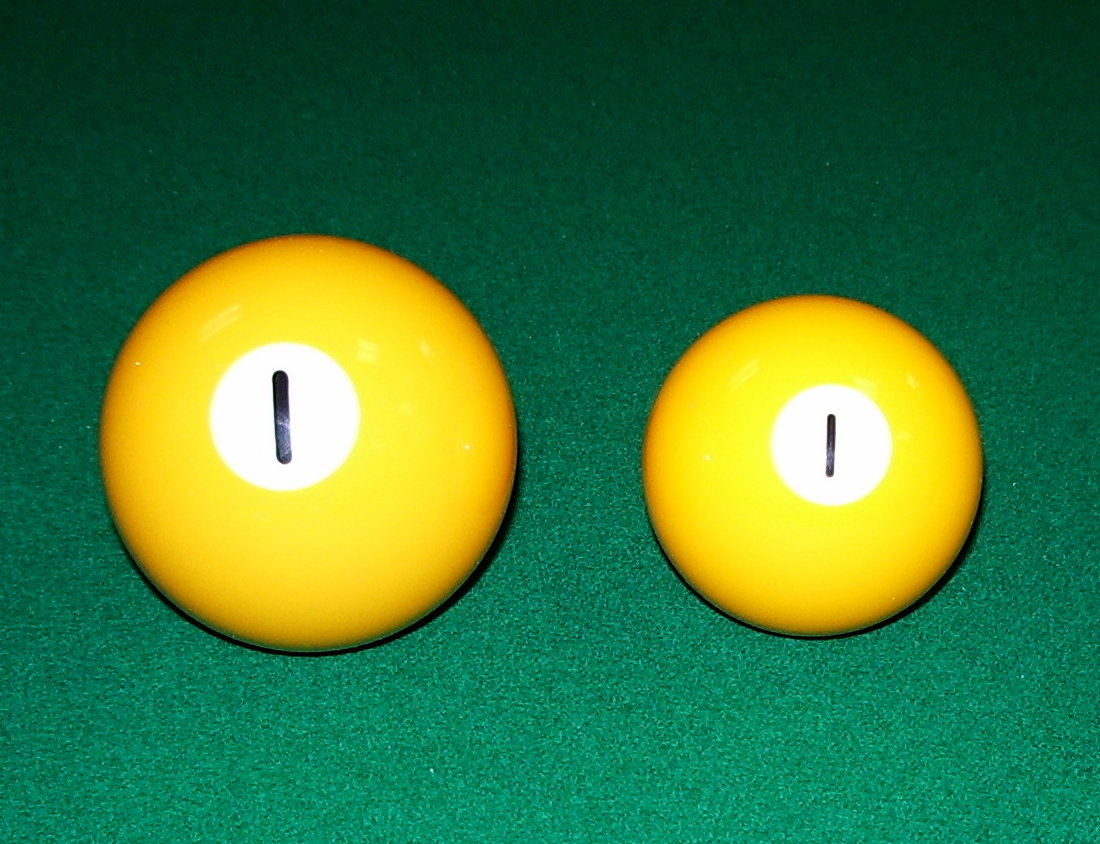
Comparison of the 68 mm (2 11/16 in) Russian and the 57 mm (2 1/4 in) common-style pool 1-ball.

Colored numbered balls for playing eight-ball, nine-ball, and other pool games on Russian billiards tables are also produced. The balls are 68 mm (2 11/16 in) in diameter, like the standard ones for Russian pyramid, and thus much larger than the American-style balls they are patterned after.

== WPA World Pyramid Championship ==
Sanctioned by the World Pool-Billiard Association (WPA).

Year	Winner
2019	(Russia) Semyon Zaitsev
2018	(Moldova) Serghei Krîjanovski
2017	(Russia) Iosif Abramov
2016	(Kazakhstan) Alikhan Karaneyev
2015	(Russia) Vladislav Osminin
2006	(Russia) Pavel Mekhovov
2005	(Russia) Yury Paschinsky
2003	(Ukraine) Yaroslav Vynokur
2002	(Russia) Ilya Kirichkov
2001	(Kazakhstan) Kanybek Sagyndykov
2000	(Russia) Evgeny Stalev
1999	(Russia) Evgeny Stalev
