= Vinokurov =

Vinokurov, feminine: Vinokurova, (also Winokurow, Winokurowa) is a Russian occupational surname derived from the word "винокур", which is an archaic name of the profession of spirit distilling. The Ukrainian-language version is Vynokurov, Vynokurova

The surname may refer to:

- Andriy Vynokurov, Ukrainian professional track cyclist
- Alexander Vinokurov (1869-1944), Soviet statesman
- Alexander Vinokourov, Kazakh professional road bicycle racer
- Eduard Vinokurov (1942–2010), Kazakh-born Soviet Olympic and world champion fencer
- Evgeny Vinokurov (born 1975), Russian economist
- Evgeny Vinokurov (poet) (1925-1993), Russian poet
- Nicolas Vinokurov, Kazakh professional road bicycle racer
- Vadym Vinokurov, Ukrainian footballer

== See also ==
- Vinokur
