= Enclave and exclave =

Territory surrounded by another state

Explanatory diagram of territorial discontinuities: Enclaves and exclaves

Different territories (countries, states, counties, municipalities, etc.) are represented by different colours and letters; separated parts of the same territory are represented by the same colour and letter, with a different number added to each smaller part of that territory (the main part is identified by the letter only).
- A:
  - possesses 4 exclaves (A2, A3, A4, and A5) and one semi-exclave (A1): it is impossible to go from the main part of A to any of these parts going only through territory of A; however:
    - A1 and A2 are not enclaves: neither of them is surrounded by a single "foreign" territory;
    - A1 is only a semi-enclave and a semi-exclave, not an enclave or exclave: it has an unsurrounded sea border;
    - A2 is an exclave of A: it is separated from A;
    - A3 is an enclave: it is completely surrounded by B;
    - A4 and A5 are counter-enclaves (also known as second-order enclaves): territories belonging to A that are encroached inside the enclave E;
  - contains 1 enclave (E): "foreign" territory totally surrounded by territory of A;
  - contains 1 counter-counter-enclave, or third-order enclave (E1).
- B:
  - contains 2 enclaves (A3 and D).
- C:
  - continuous territory, contains no enclave or exclave
- D:
  - is an enclaved territory: it is territorially continuous, but its territory is totally surrounded by a single "foreign" territory (B).
- E:
  - is an enclaved territory: it is inside A;
  - contains 2 enclaves (A4 and A5), which are counter-enclaves of A;
  - possesses 1 counter-enclave (E1), which is a counter-counter-enclave as viewed by A and contained within A5.
In topological terms, A and E are each (sets of) unconnected surfaces, and B, C, and D are connected surfaces. However, C and D are also simply connected surfaces, while B is not (it has first Betti number 2, the number of "holes" in B).

An enclave is a territory that is entirely surrounded by the territory of only one other state or entity. An enclave can be an independent territory or part of a larger one. Enclaves may also exist within territorial waters. Enclave is sometimes used improperly to denote a territory that is only partly surrounded by another state. Enclaves that are not part of a larger territory are not exclaves. Three such sovereign states exist globally: Lesotho (enclaved by South Africa), San Marino, and Vatican City (both enclaved by Italy).

An exclave is a portion of a state or district geographically separated from the main part, by some surrounding alien territory. Many exclaves are also enclaves, but an exclave surrounded by the territory of more than one state is not an enclave. The Azerbaijani exclave of Nakhchivan is an example of an exclave that is not an enclave, as it borders Armenia, Iran, and Turkey.

Semi-enclaves and semi-exclaves are areas that, except for possessing an unsurrounded sea border, would otherwise be enclaves or exclaves. Semi-enclaves and enclaves are mutually exclusive. Likewise, semi-exclaves and exclaves are mutually exclusive. Enclaves and semi-enclaves can exist as independent states (Monaco, The Gambia and Brunei are semi-enclaves), while exclaves and semi-exclaves proper always constitute just a part of a sovereign state (like the Kaliningrad Oblast and the state of Alaska).

A pene-exclave is a part of the territory of one country that can be conveniently approached—by traffic in particular—only through the territory of another country. Pene-exclaves are also called functional exclaves or practical exclaves. Many pene-exclaves partially border their own territorial waters (i.e., they are not surrounded by other nations' territorial waters), such as Washington's Point Roberts and Minnesota's Northwest Angle (both in the United States). A pene-exclave can also exist entirely on land, such as when intervening mountains render a territory inaccessible from other parts of a country except through alien territory. A commonly cited example is the Kleinwalsertal, a valley part of Vorarlberg, Austria, that is accessible only from Germany to the north.

== Origin and usage ==
The word enclave is French and first appeared in the mid-15th century as a derivative of the verb enclaver (1283), from the colloquial Latin inclavare (to close with a key). Originally, it was a term of property law that denoted a land or parcel of land surrounded by land owned by a different owner, and that could not be reached for its exploitation in a practical and sufficient manner without crossing the surrounding land. In law, this created a servitude of passage for the benefit of the owner of the surrounded land. The first diplomatic document to contain the word enclave was the Treaty of Madrid, signed in 1526.

Later, the term enclave began to be used also to refer to parcels of countries, counties, fiefs, communes, towns, parishes, etc. that were surrounded by alien territory. This French word eventually entered English and other languages to denote the same concept, although local terms have continued to be used. In India, the word pocket is often used as a synonym for enclave (such as "the pockets of Puducherry district"). In British administrative history, subnational enclaves were usually called detachments or detached parts, and national enclaves as detached districts or detached dominions. In British ecclesiastic history, subnational enclaves were known as peculiars (see also royal peculiar).

The word exclave is a logically extended back-formation of enclave.

== Characteristics ==
Enclaves exist for a variety of historical, political and geographical reasons. For example, in the feudal system in Europe, the ownership of feudal domains was often transferred or partitioned, either through purchase and sale or through inheritance, and often such domains were or came to be surrounded by other domains. In particular, this state of affairs persisted into the 19th century in the Holy Roman Empire, and these domains (principalities, etc.) exhibited many of the characteristics of sovereign states. Prior to 1866 Prussia alone consisted of more than 270 discontiguous pieces of territory.

Residing in an enclave within another country has often involved difficulties in such areas as passage rights, importing goods, currency, provision of utilities and health services, and host nation cooperation. Thus, over time, enclaves have tended to be eliminated. For example, two-thirds of the then-existing national-level enclaves were extinguished on 1 August 2015, when the governments of India and Bangladesh implemented a Land Boundary Agreement that exchanged 162 first-order enclaves (111 Indian and 51 Bangladeshi). This exchange thus effectively removed another two dozen second-order enclaves and one third-order enclave, eliminating 197 of the India–Bangladesh enclaves in all. The residents in these enclaves had complained of being effectively stateless. Only Bangladesh's Dahagram–Angarpota enclave remained.

Netherlands and Belgium decided to keep the enclave and exclave system in Baarle. As both Netherlands and Belgium are members of the European Union and Schengen Area, people, goods and services flow freely with few or no restrictions.

== Enclave versus exclave ==
For illustration, in the figure (above), A1 is a semi-enclave (attached to C and also bounded by water that only touches C's territorial water). Although A2 is an exclave of A, it cannot be classed as an enclave because it shares borders with B and C. The territory A3 is both an exclave of A and an enclave from the viewpoint of B. The singular territory D, although an enclave, is not an exclave.

== True enclaves ==
An enclave is a part of the territory of a state that is enclosed within the territory of another state. To distinguish the parts of a state entirely enclosed in a single other state, they are called true enclaves. A true enclave cannot be reached without passing through the territory of a single other state that surrounds it. In 2007, Evgeny Vinokurov called this the restrictive definition of "enclave" given by international law, which thus "comprises only so-called 'true enclaves'." Two examples are Büsingen am Hochrhein, an exclave of Germany, and Campione d'Italia, an exclave of Italy, both of which are surrounded by, and thus are true enclaves, of Switzerland.

The definition of a territory comprises both land territory and territorial waters. In the case of enclaves in territorial waters, they are called maritime (those surrounded by territorial sea) or lacustrine (if in a lake) enclaves. Most of the true national-level enclaves now existing are in Asia and Europe. While subnational enclaves are numerous the world over, there are only a few national-level true enclaves in Africa, Australia and the Americas (each such enclave being surrounded by the territorial waters of another country).

A historical example is West Berlin before the reunification of Germany. Since 1945, all of Berlin had been ruled de jure by the four Allied powers. However, the East German government and the Soviet Union treated East Berlin as an integral part of East Germany, so West Berlin was a de facto enclave within East Germany. Also, 12 small West Berlin enclaves, such as Steinstücken, were separated from the city, some by only a few meters.

== True exclaves ==
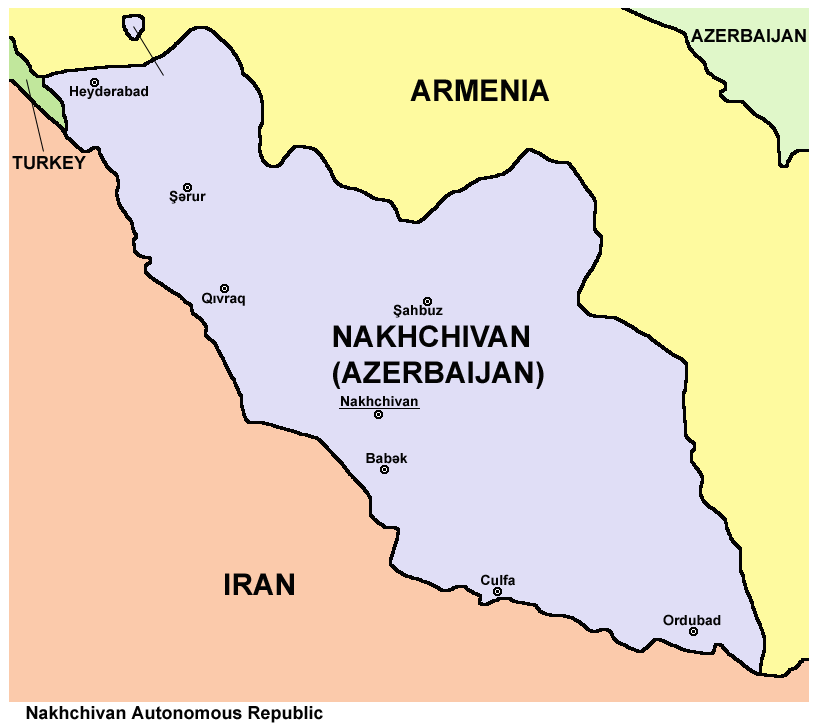
The Nakhchivan Autonomous Republic, a true exclave

True exclave is an extension of the concept of true enclave. In order to access a true exclave from the mainland, a traveller must go through the territory of at least one other state. The Nakhchivan Autonomous Republic is an example of a true exclave, as to access it from the Azerbaijan mainland, a traveller must pass through the territory of at least one foreign country (Armenia, Iran, or Turkey).

== Related constructs and terms ==
	Enclave	Exclave	Semi-enclave	Semi-exclave	Both enclave and exclave	Enclave but not exclave	Exclave but not enclave	Both semi-enclave and semi-exclave	Semi-enclave but not semi-exclave	Semi-exclave but not semi-enclave
Number of distinct alien territory (Note: including sea territory, excluding international sea) bordered	1 (Note: called maritime enclave if surrounded by alien territorial sea)	≥ 1	1	≥ 1	1	1	> 1	1	1	> 1
Belongs to a larger territory	Maybe	Yes	Maybe	Yes	Yes	No	Yes	Yes	No	Yes
Has unsurrounded sea border(s) (Note: has direct access to international waters; a sovereign semi-en/exclave must have a land boundary longer than its coastline)	No	No	Yes	Yes	No	No	No	Yes	Yes	Yes

=== Semi-enclaves and semi-exclaves ===
Semi-enclaves and semi-exclaves are areas that, except for possessing a sea border that is not surrounded, would otherwise be enclaves or exclaves. Semi-enclaves can exist as independent states that border only one other state, such as Monaco, the Gambia and Brunei. Vinokurov (2007) declares, "Technically, Portugal, Denmark, and Canada also border only one foreign state, but they are not enclosed in the geographical, political, or economic sense. They have vast access to international waters. At the same time, there are states that, although in possession of sea access, are still enclosed by the territories of a foreign state." Therefore, a quantitative principle applies: the land boundary must be longer than the coastline. Thus a state is classified as a sovereign semi-enclave if it borders on just one state, and its land boundary is longer than its sea coastline.

(Since Vinokurov's writing in 2007, Canada and the Kingdom of Denmark have each gained a second bordering state — each other — with the 2022 division of Hans Island.)

Vinokurov affirms that "no similar quantitative criterion is needed to define the scope of non-sovereign semi-enclaves/exclaves."

=== Subnational enclaves and exclaves ===
Sometimes, administrative divisions of a country, for historical or practical reasons, caused some areas to belong to one division while being attached to another.

=== "Practical" enclaves, exclaves and inaccessible districts ===
The term pene-exclave was defined in Robinson (1959) as "parts of the territory of one country that can be approached conveniently – in particular by wheeled traffic – only through the territory of another country." Thus, a pene-exclave, although having land borders, is not completely surrounded by the other's land or territorial waters. Catudal (1974) and Vinokurov (2007) further elaborate upon examples, including Point Roberts. "Although physical connections by water with Point Roberts are entirely within the sovereignty of the United States, land access is only possible through Canada."

Pene-enclaves are also called functional enclaves or practical enclaves. They can exhibit continuity of state territory across territorial waters but, nevertheless, a discontinuity on land, such as in the case of Point Roberts. Along rivers that change course, pene-enclaves can be observed as complexes comprising many small pene-enclaves. A pene-enclave can also exist entirely on land, such as when intervening mountains render a territory, although geographically attached, inaccessible from other parts of a country except through alien territory. A commonly cited example is the Kleinwalsertal, a valley part of Vorarlberg, Austria, that is only accessible from Germany to the north, being separated from the rest of Austria by high mountains traversed by no roads. Another example is the Spanish village of Os de Civís, accessible from Andorra. The hamlet of Boston Corner was a pene-exclave of Massachusetts, separated by mountains, until it was ceded to New York.

Hence, such areas are enclaves or exclaves for practical purposes, without meeting the strict definition. Many pene-exclaves partially border the sea or another body of water, which comprises their own territorial waters (i.e., they are not surrounded by other nations' territorial waters). They border their own territorial waters in addition to a land border with another country, and hence they are not true exclaves. Still, one cannot travel to them on land without going through another country. Attribution of a pene-enclave status to a territory can sometimes be disputed, depending on whether the territory is considered to be practically inaccessible from the mainland or not.

=== Land owned by a foreign country ===
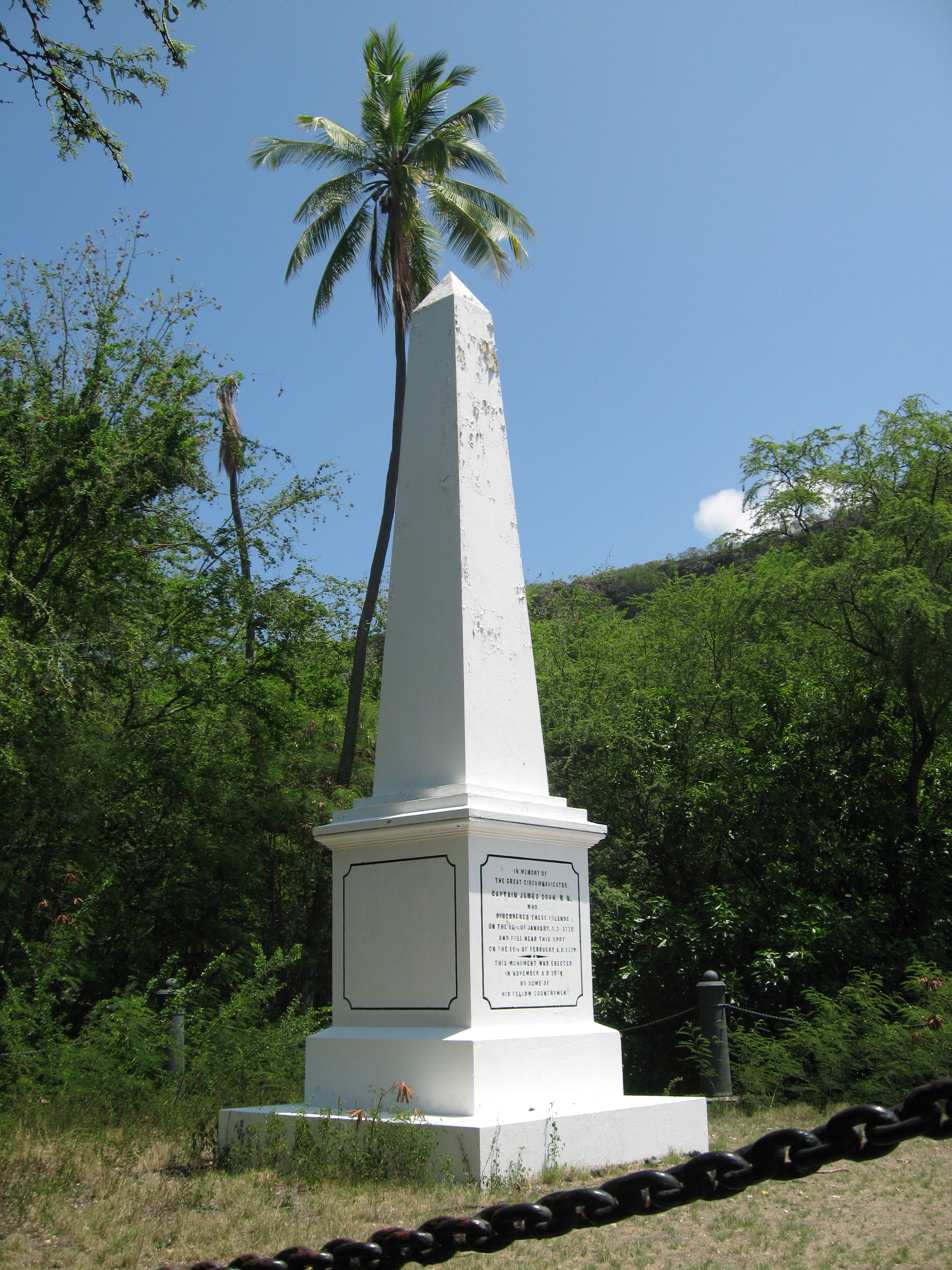
Land for the Captain Cook Monument was deeded outright to the British government by the independent nation of Hawaii in 1877.

One or more parcels/holdings of land in most countries is owned by other countries. Most instances are exempt from taxes. In the special case of embassies/consulates these enjoy special privileges driven by international consensus particularly the mutual wish to ensure free diplomatic missions, such as being exempt from major hindrances and host-country arrests in ordinary times on the premises. Most non-embassy lands in such ownership are also not enclaves as they fall legally short of extraterritoriality, they are subject to alike court jurisdiction as before their grant/sale in most matters. Nonetheless, for a person's offence against the property itself, equally valid jurisdiction in criminal matters is more likely than elsewhere, assuming the perpetrator is found in the prosecuting authority's homeland. Devoid of permanent residents, formally defined new sovereignty is not warranted or asserted in the examples below. Nonetheless, minor laws, especially on flag flying, are sometimes relaxed to accommodate the needs of the accommodated nation's monument.

Embassies enjoy many different legal statuses approaching quasi-sovereignty, depending on the agreements reached and in practice upheld from time-to-time by host nations. Subject to hosts adhering to basic due process of international law, including giving warnings, the enforced reduction of scope of a foreign embassy has always been a possibility, even to the point of expelling the foreign embassy entirely, usually on a breakdown of relations, in reaction to extreme actions such as espionage, or as another form of sanction. The same seems to be possible in profit-driven moving or drilling under any of the sites below, providing safeguards as the structure or a new replacement site. The same possible curtailments and alterations never apply to proper exclaves.

== See also ==
- Flagpole annexation
- Landlocked country
- Panhandle
- Inner suburb
- Extraterritoriality of Princess Margriet's birth

=== Lists ===
- List of countries that border only one other country
- List of enclaves and exclaves
- List of ethnic enclaves in North American cities
- List of former foreign enclaves in China

== General and cited references ==
- Robinson, G. W. S. (September 1959). "Exclaves". Annals of the Association of American Geographers. 49 (3, [Part 1]): 283–295. doi:10.1111/j.1467-8306.1959.tb01614.x. JSTOR 2561461.
- Vinokurov, Evgeny (2007). A Theory of Enclaves. Lexington Books. ISBN 978-0-7391-2403-1. Archived from the original on 2017-03-14.
