= Boris Tomashevsky =

Literary historian and critic

Professor Boris Tomashevsky
- Born: November 29, 1890; Saint Petersburg, Russia
- Died: August 24, 1957 (aged 66); Gurzuf
- Education: PhD
- Alma mater: Sorbonna
- Known for: Literary critic, theorist of poetry and textual criticism, researcher of Pushkin's work, writer
- Scientific career
- Fields: Literary criticism, Textual criticism, Theory of poetry
- Institutions: Pushkin House, National Institute of Art History, Leningrad University

Boris Viktorovich Tomashevsky (Russian: Бори́с Ви́кторович Томаше́вский, IPA: [təmɐˈʂɛfskʲɪj]; 29 November 1890 – 24 August 1957) was a Russian Formalist literary critic, theorist of poetry, textual analyst, historian of Russian literature, Pushkin scholar, translator, and writer. He was a member of the Moscow linguistic circle, the OPOJAZ and the Union of Soviet Writers.

== Biography ==
Tomashevsky finished Gymnasium (high school) in 1908 but was unable to attend the Polytechnical Institute. He received training in statistics and electrical engineering in Liège and Paris and took classes at Sorbonne. Upon returning to Russia he came out with his first publications on questions of engineering and on literary themes in 1915. He associated with the social circle connected with the journal Apollo. He participated in World War I, fighting on the Austrian front from 1915 to 1918. At the end of the war he worked in Moscow.

Moving to Petrograd, he joined the Art History Institute in 1921 but later moved to the Pushkin House, where he managed the manuscript department in 1946-57 and the department of Pushkin studies in 1957. He started giving lectures on text analysis, literary theory, and the work of Pushkin at the State Institute of Art History, From 1924 he taught in the department of Russian literature at Leningrad University. He died and was buried in Gurzuf.

== Academic Activity ==
Tomashevsky was involved in compiling the Ushakov Dictionary and supervised the first Soviet editions of Pushkin's and Dostoyevsky's collected works. He supervised the editing of A. N. Ostrovsky's collected works, A. P. Chekhov's selected texts, and later, the entire academic collection of Pushkin's collected works (1937-1949). He helped establish the Pushkin Museum in Gurzuf He participated in compiling a dictionary of Pushkin's language and in the editing of Pushkin's "Literary Heritage" volumes. He helped with a number of publications of texts by poets from the eighteenth to the early nineteenth centuries in a series called "Library of a Poet."

He wrote major works on versification, poetics, stylistics, text analysis, Pushkin studies, and French poetry.

He wrote Pushkin. Contemporary Problems of historical literary study in 1925. His monograph Theory of Literature (Poetics), also published in 1925, was the first systematic exposition of Formalist doctrine. Another important theoretical work is The Writer and the Book: An Outline of Textology (1928, second edition 1959). He was especially interested in the theory of versification. In his metrical studies, following in the footsteps of Andrey Bely, he applied statistical procedures to the study of Russian poetry and succeeded in "raising versification to a quantified science". His other major works include On Poetry (1929), A Short Course in Poetics (5th edition -Leningrad, 1931), and many articles. Tomashevsky's works have been translated into several languages.
