= Kozma Spassky-Avtonomov =

Kozma Fyodorovich Spassky-Avtonomov (Russian: Козьма Фёдорович Спасский-Автономов) was born in 1807, in Zakharovka, now Lipetsk Oblast and died in 1890. He was a Russian researcher of the region of Baku, then a city in the Russian Empire, but now in Azerbaijan, on the Caspian Sea. Baku is interesting geologically as it is the lowest lying national capital in the world, some 28 metres below sea level. It is located on the southern shore of the Absheron Peninsula, alongside the Bay of Baku.

Spassky-Avtonomov arrived in Baku with his children on July 27, 1847, shortly after the discovery of oil in the region. He became the head of Baku Quarantine Customs Service. During this time, the instrumental studies of the Caspian Sea level, started in 1830, were ongoing. Spassky-Avtonomov began writing about Baku in 1847, leaving numerous accounts of the city and its inhabitants in detail.

Along with his brother Mikhail, he was one of the leading scientists in the fields of climatology and meteorology in the country. Kozma, a member of the Russian Geographic Society, was versed on both subjects, but his main interests were in the study of local folk literature.
