= Gustav Shpet =

Russian philosopher (1879–1937)

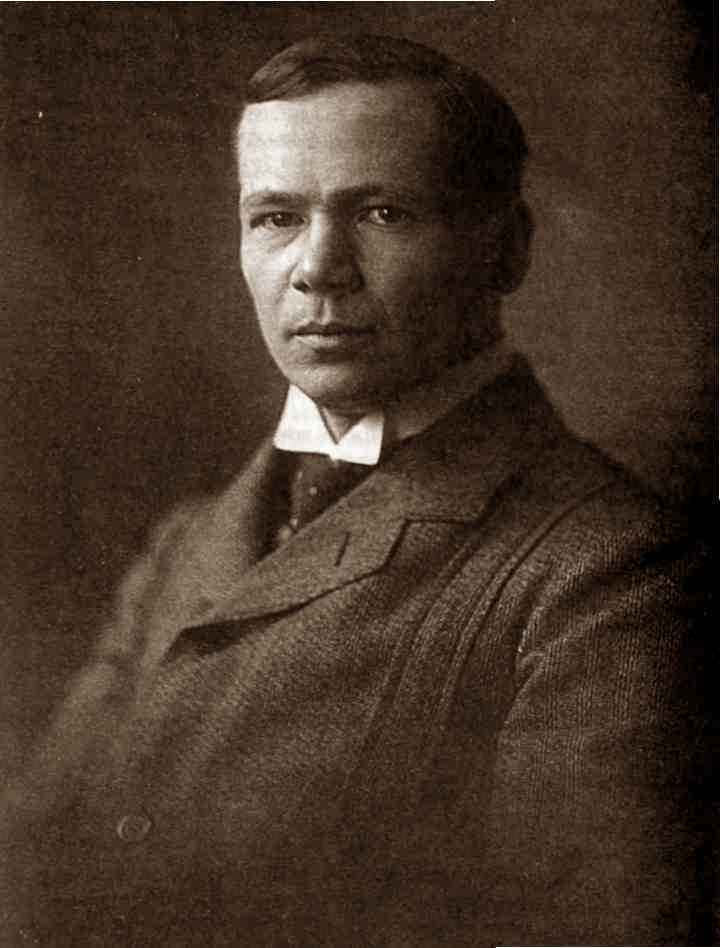
Shpet in the 1920s

Gustav Gustavovich Shpet (Russian: Густа́в Густа́вович Шпет; 7 April [O.S. 26 March] 1879, Kiev, Russian Empire – November 16, 1937, Tomsk, Russian SFSR) was a Russian philosopher, historian of philosophy, psychologist, art theoretician, and interpreter of German and Polish descent. He knew 17 languages.

He was a student of a well-known Russian psychologist and philosopher George Chelpanov, a follower of Edmund Husserl's phenomenology, who introduced Husserlian phenomenology to Russia, modifying the phenomenology which he found in Husserl. Shpet was a Vice president of the Russian State Academy of Arts in Moscow (1923—1929). Shpet is an author of many books, including his famous A View on the History of Russian philosophy (Russian: Очерк развития русской философии; in 2 vols.) and The Hermeneutics and its problems (Russian: Герменевтика и её проблемы).

== Biography ==
Shpet was born as the illegitimate son of an Austro-Hungarian officer and a mother of Polish-German descent of an aristocratic background.

Shpet enrolled in St. Vladimir University of Kiev in 1898, but was expelled for joining a Marxist circle. He never adopted a Marxist philosophical viewpoint, even though he sympathised with the socio-economic aims of Marxism.

As a thinker, he was thoroughly grounded in Russian religious thought of the late nineteenth and early twentieth centuries. His philosophy combined Husserl's analysis of the structure of consciousness with Platonism of Orthodoxy, the doctrine of incarnation, and veneration of matter.

In 1921 he founded the Institute of Scientific Philosophy in Moscow. From 1921 he was a full member of the Russian Academy of Art Sciences and from 1924 he was vice-president of the academy.

His espousal of Husserl's phenomenology influenced the literary scholars Mikhail Petrovsky, Grigoriy Vinokur, and Mikhail Stoliarov.

== Death ==
Shpet was a victim of the Great Purge. He was originally arrested on 14 March 1935, along with several other former colleagues from the State Art Academy. He was charged with anti-soviet activities, received a sentence of five years internal exile, and was sent to Tomsk, the first university city in Siberia. Here Shpet worked on a new Russian translation of Hegel's The Phenomenology of Spirit. However, he was arrested again on 27 October 1937 and charged with belonging to a monarchist organisation. He was executed on 16 November 1937.

He was posthumously rehabilitated in 1956.
