= Konstantin Kornilov =

Soviet psychologist (1879–1957)

- Константин Корнилов
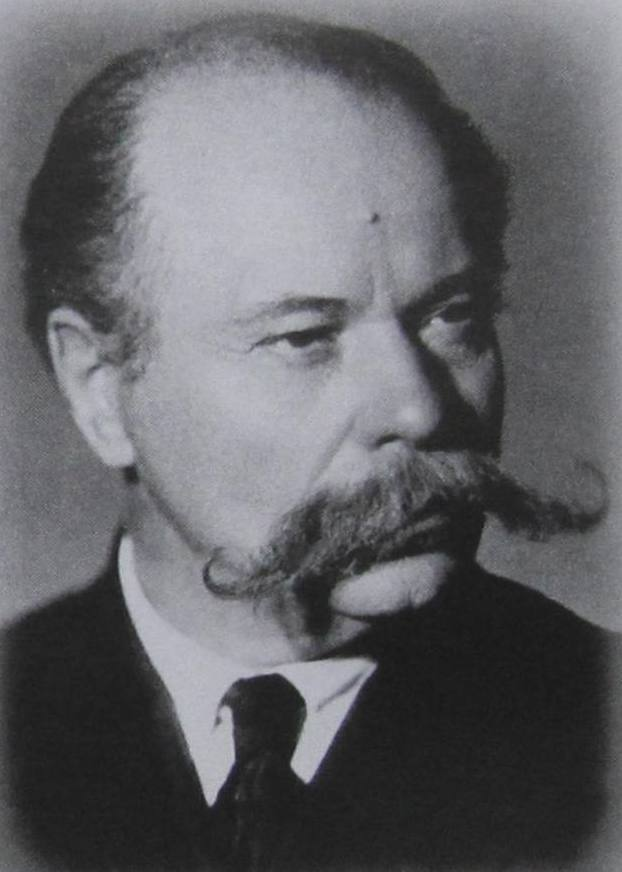
- Born: Konstantin Nikolayevich Kornilov; 8 March 1879; Tyumen, Russian Empire
- Died: July 10, 1957 (aged 78); Moscow, Russian SFSR, Soviet Union
- Resting place: Novodevichy Cemetery
- Education: Imperial Moscow University
- Known for: Marxist psychology, reactology
- Awards: Order of Lenin; Order of the Red Banner of Labour
- Scientific career
- Fields: Psychology, pedagogy
- Workplaces: Moscow State University; Institute of Psychology; Russian Academy of Pedagogical Sciences

Konstantin Nikolayevich Kornilov (Russian: Константин Николаевич Корнилов; 8 March [O.S. 24 February] 1879 – 10 July 1957) was a Soviet psychologist. Kornilov is known for being the initiator of restructuring the science of psychology on the basis of Marxist philosophy in the Soviet Union, which made him to be considered the "first Soviet psychologist".

== Biography ==
Kornilov was born in to the family of an accountant. After his graduation from the city school, he worked as a teacher. According to himself, he was a member of the Russian Social Democratic Labour Party from 1905 and a member of the RSDLP Internationalists from 1917.

He received a certificate at the Tomsk Gymnasium, and in 1910 he graduated from the Faculty of History and Philology of Moscow University. From 1912 he was a researcher at the Psychological Institute od Moscow University and from 1916 he was a Privatdozent of the university.

After the October Revolution, Kornilov was one of the first among scientists who offered their services to the young Soviet state. On behalf of the People's Commissariat for Education, he organized the Pedagogical Faculty at the Second Moscow University and was its first dean. When the State Pedagogical Institute was created on the basis of this institution, he headed the department of psychology, which he headed until the end of his life.

At the I and II All-Russian Congresses on Psychoneurology (in 1923 and 1924), Kornilov substantiated the need for a connection between psychology and Marxist dialectics.

In 1926, the first edition of his "Textbook of Psychology" was published. From 1928 to 1930, he was editor of the journal "Psychology". From 1923 to 1930 he was director of the Institute of Psychology.

In 1930, during inspections and audits of the Institute of Experimental Psychology of the Russian Academy of Social Sciences, the commission of the Rabkrin revealed the inefficiency of the work of this scientific institution and the misappropriation of the allocated budget funds. As a result, in November 1930, Kornilov was dismissed from the leadership of the institute and the institute was fundamentally reorganized after Aron Zalkind was appointed director. Just a few months later, in the spring of 1931, in a reorganized and renamed institute under the leadership of Zalkind and with the active participation of Lev Vygotsky, Alexander Luria and others, a critical scientific discussion was held to discuss the theoretical provisions and practical application of the so-called “reactological” concept of Kornilov (in other words: Kornilov's “reactology”), in during which this direction in psychology was criticized and removed from the agenda of the institute.

Nevertheless, after the resignation of the next director of the Institute of Psychology, V. N. Kolbanovsky, he was again appointed director of the institute in 1938 and held this position until 1941.

During the final decade of his life, Kornilov abandoned his theory of reactology and devoted his work in pedagogical sciences. From 1943 he was a full member and until 1953, vice-president of the Academy of Pedagogical Sciences of the RSFSR. From 1946 to 1956 he was editor-in-chief of the "Family and School" journal.

Kornilov died in Moscow and was buried at the Novodevichy Cemetery.

== Scientific work ==
Konstantin Kornilov developed the concept of reactology in the 1920s. In his textbook, "The Doctrine of the Human Reaction" (1921), he sets the task of "studying human behavior as a set of reactions to biosocial irritations." The key element of the psyche is the reaction, in which the objective and the subjective are inseparable. It is observed and measured objectively, but the activity of consciousness is hidden behind this external movement. The reaction is determined by him by the basic form of any vital manifestation.

In January 1923, in Moscow, at the 1st All-Russian Congress on Psychoneurology, Kornilov made a report directed against his former teacher Georgy Chelpanov. He subjected traditional psychology to devastating criticism, demanding the extension of Marxist theory to this region. Although fellow psychologists such as Pavel Blonsky, Mikhail Basov, Lev Vygotsky and Sergei Rubinstein supported the thesis, Kornilov's theory of reactology, which Kornilov tried to espouse as Marxist psychology, only combined Marxist principles with some mechanistic ideas. Reactology did not receive support at the psychological discussion in 1931 and was heavily criticised, which forced Kornilov to abandon his concept.

== Selected works ==
- Учение о реакциях человека с психологической точки зрения («реактология») (1921)
- Современная психология и марксизм (1923)
- Диалектический метод в психологии (1923)
- Современная психология и марксизм. (1924)
- Психология и марксизм. Select writings (1925)
- Современное состояние психологии в СССР (1927)
- Учебник психологии, изложенной с точки зрения диалектического материализма (1929)
