= Antomanov =

Antomanov (Russian: Антома́нов; masculine) or Antomanova (Антома́нова; feminine) is a Russian last name.

While this last name is considered to simply be a variety of the last name Avtonomov (which is derived from a patronymic itself derived from the male first name Avtonom), it is also possible that this particular form was influenced by the first name Anton.
