= Dmitry Ushakov =

Russian philologist (1873–1942)

- Дмитрий Ушаков
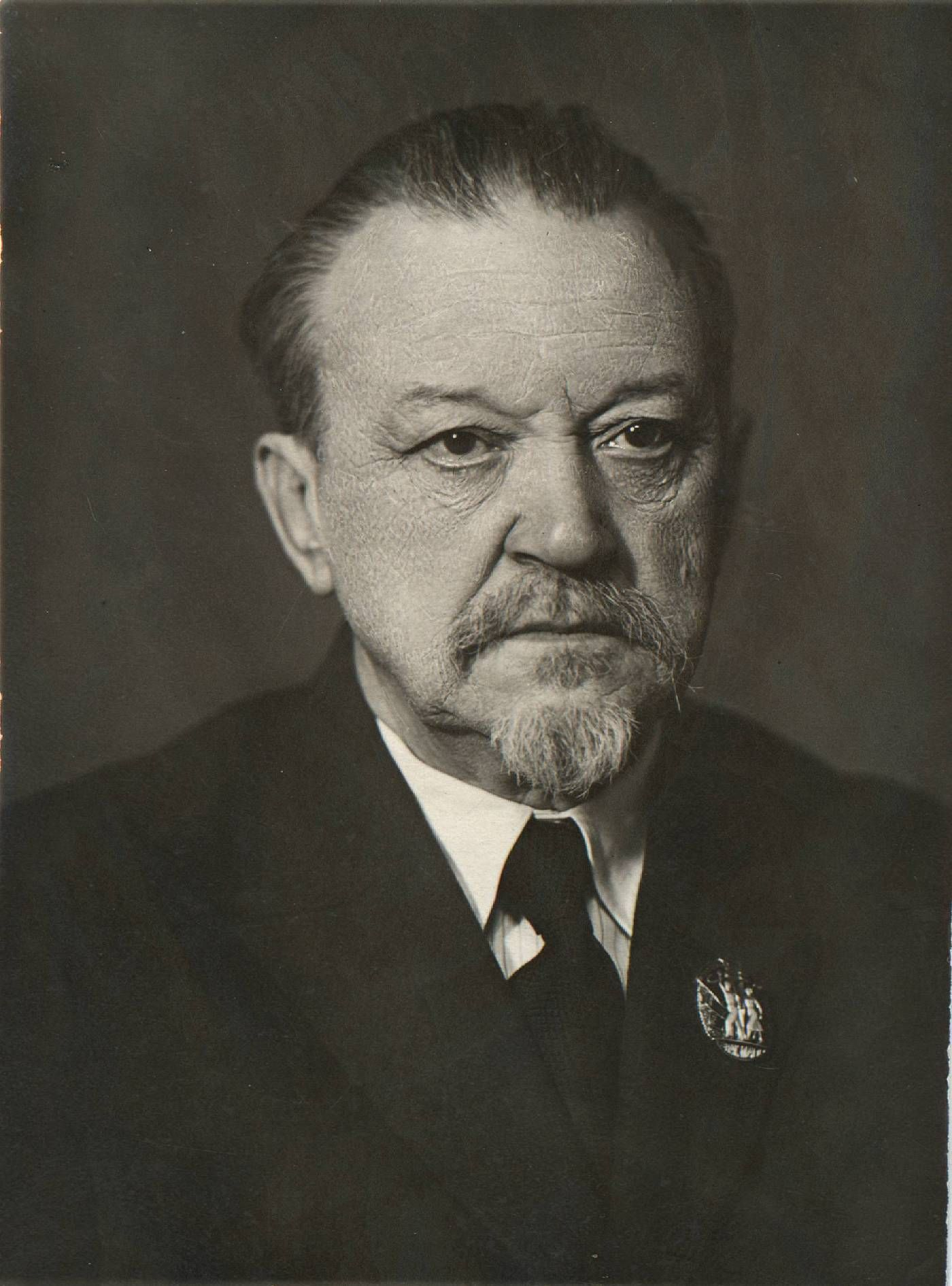
- Born: Дмитрий Николаевич Ушаков; 24 January 1873; Moscow, Russian Empire
- Died: 17 April 1942 (aged 69); Tashkent, Soviet Union (now Uzbekistan)

Academic background
- Education: Moscow State University
- Doctoral advisor: Filipp Fortunatov

Dmitry Nikolayevich Ushakov (Russian: Дмитрий Николаевич Ушаков; 24 January 1873 – 17 April 1942) was a Russian philologist and lexicographer.

He was the creator and chief editor (1935–1940) of the 4-volume Explanatory Dictionary of the Russian Language with over 90,000 entries. He was also the creator of an orthographic dictionary of the Russian language (1934).

He influenced his student, Grigoriy Vinokur, who dedicated his book The Russian Language: A Brief History to him.

Ushakov died in Tashkent, where he had been evacuated to during World War II. His work on a definitive explanatory dictionary of the Russian language was continued by Sergei Ozhegov.
