= Moscow linguistic circle =

Group of social scientists in semiotics

The Moscow linguistic circle was a group of social scientists in semiotics, literary theory, and linguistics active in Moscow from 1915 to ca. 1924. Its members included Roman Jakobson (its founder), Filipp Fortunatov, Grigoriy Vinokur, Boris Tomashevsky, and Petr Bogatyrev. The group was a counterpart to the St. Petersburg linguistic group OPOJAZ; between them, these two groups (together with the later Prague linguistic circle) were responsible for the development of Russian formalist literary semiotics and linguistics.
