= Avtonoma =

Avtonoma (Russian: Автоно́ма) is a Russian female first name. Its masculine version is Avtonom.

In 1924–1930, the name was included into various Soviet calendars, which included the new and often artificially created names promoting the new Soviet realities and encouraging the break with the tradition of using the names in the Synodal Menologia.
