= Ushakov Dictionary =

Russian language dictionary

The Explanatory Dictionary of the Russian Language, also called just Ushakov's Dictionary, is one of the major dictionaries of the Russian language.

Edited by the philologist and lexicographer Dmitry Ushakov, the dictionary was published in four volumes over the period 1935–1940. Its appearance filled an important gap in the description of modern 20th-century Russian. The success of the dictionary may be partly attributed to the work of skilled specialists using lexicographic works from the 19th and 20th centuries, without which the picture of the modern Russian language would be incomplete. The dictionary contains over 90,000 entries and is designed for a wide range of readers.

== Editions ==
- Dictionary of the Russian Language (Толковый словарь русского языка). Four volumes. D.N Ushakov, editor. 1935–1940, State Publishing House of Foreign and National Dictionaries. (Second edition was published in 1947–1948.) (in Russian)
