= Nikolai Avtonomov =

Nikolai Petrovich Avtonomov (April 18, 1894, Sergiyevskaya, Don Host Oblast - August 13, 1979, St. Petersburg, Florida, U.S.) was a former Orthodox clergyman who later became an Eastern Catholic clergyman in exile.

== Early life ==
Avtonomov was born on April 6, 1894, in the family of Peter Viktorovich Avtonomov, a priest of Sergiyevskaya, and Anastasia Avtonomova.

He studied at Tambov seminary where he was expelled in 1909 from Class 4 for drunkenness. Beginning in 1909 he served as a psalmist in Lebedyan. In 1918, he took the rank of priest. In 1920, he was a priest in Tsaritsyn (Stalingrad) Russian Orthodox diocese. In 1922 and 1923 his standing declined in renovationist split.

=== Russian Orthodox Bishop ===
On May 18, 1930, Avtonomov was consecrated as bishop of Stavropol and in December 1932 was a renovationist Bishop of Tver. In June 1933, Avtonomov was dismissed. On July 21, 1933, he was dismissed from the Tver diocese for wrong actions that degraded the dignity of the bishops. On February 7, 1934, he was prohibited from serving for tactless activity as rector of the Cathedral of the city of Makhachkala. He tried to get in Makhachkala autocephaly.

On 11 April 1934 he was allowed into the priesthood. On August 16, 1934, he was seconded to Kursk and on September 13, 1934, approved to become the ruling bishop of Old Oskol diocese. On December 29, 1934, he was dismissed from the Old-Oskol diocese, with the right to be a dean. On January 30, 1935, he was seconded to the Metropolitan Ivanovo. From December 1935 he took priestly jobs in Ivanovo. On December 5, 1936, he was elevated to the rank of archbishop.

== Ukraine ==
In December 1942, he was evacuated to Ukraine, where he deceived the Exarch Ukrainian Autonomous Church Metropolitan Alexy (Gromadskaya), which in January 3, 1943 appointed him temporary administrator of the diocese. The three bishops of the Ukrainian Autonomous Church on June 5, 1943 rejected him, followed by a ban on Avtonomova from serving.

== Poland ==
On January 29, 1944, with his wife, daughter and granddaughter, he arrived in Warsaw and at the request of the local German administration, ministered to non-German parts formed from the East.

== Relations with ROCOR ==
May 26, 1944, calling himself "Orthodox leader for legionnaires and Wehrmacht military units and garrisons in the General Government," he addressed the Synod of Bishops of the ROCOR with a petition to adopt it in canonical communion. Response from the Synod was not followed, but one of its members, the Metropolitan of Berlin and Germany Seraphim (Lade), June 21, wrote to the Archbishop.

== Germany ==
At a meeting with Peter Krasnov, Avtonomov made a favorable impression. On August 8 Head "church essay" Reich Security Main Office (RSHA) Neuhaus agreed to appoint him Bishop Nicholas of the Main Department of Cossack troops. On August 16, 1945, Avtonomov wrote another petition to the Synod of Bishops, and on August 26, 1945, to Metropolitan Anastasia (Gribanovsky). The Synod conducted an investigation and discovered Avtonomov's imposture.

In addition, Metropolitan Anastasia referred him to the Autonomous Council of Bishops of the Ukrainian Church in Warsaw on April 8, 1944, which confirmed the decision of the three bishops of the Church of June 5, 1943, and the report of the Chairman of the Commission on Ecclesiastical Affairs. On April 9, 1945, the Synod of Bishops finally rejected his request for reconsideration.

== Conversion to Catholicism ==
After a few months of autonomy, Avtonomov was adopted y the Catholic Church, which named him Titular bishop of Ratiaria on October 6, 1945. He was allowed to preserve the Eastern rite, and then elevated by Pope Pius XII to the rank of Metropolitan with a right cross and awarded a pectoral cross. As Archbishop and Uniate Metropolitan he gained autonomy. In December 1945 he came to Munich, where he began to publish the magazine The Bell and gave it to the Uniate Church. However, a year and a half later he was exposed as an impostor, removed and sent to a Catholic monastery.

== Arrest ==
On December 15, 1947, the U.S. occupation administration arrested Avtonomov on charges of spying for the Soviet Union. On March 10, 1948, Avtonomov was released on bail and the charges were dropped for lack of evidence.

== Release ==
After his release, was appointed to the Vatican to work with Russian emigrants in South America. There Avtonomov broke with the Catholics and emigrated to the United States. In the 1950s, he several times unsuccessfully tried to join the American metropolis and in 1962 filed a petition for adoption into the Greek Exarchate. In the late 1960s he lived in New Haven, Connecticut. According to some sources he served in Byzantine Catholic Archeparchy of Pittsburgh as a parish priest. Then he lived in retirement.

== Death ==
Avtonomov died on August 13, 1979, in St. Petersburg, Florida, United States. He was buried in the same place at the episcopal rank.
