= Grigoriy Vinokur =

- Григорий Винокур
- Born: 17 November 1896; Warsaw, Congress Poland
- Died: May 17, 1947; Moscow, Soviet Union
- Resting place: Vvedenskoye Cemetery
- Citizenship: Soviet
- Education: Mazing Real School
- Alma mater: Moscow State University
- Occupation: Linguist
- Scientific career
- Workplaces: MSU; Gorky Institute of World Literature; Pushkin House
- Academic advisors: Dmitry Ushakov
- Notable students: Aleksey Savchenko

Grigoriy Osipovich Vinokur (Russian: Григорий Осипович Винокур; 17 November 1896, Warsaw – 17 May 1947, Moscow) was a Polish-born Russian linguist and literary historian. He was educated in Moscow. After a brief spell as an interpreter in Estonia and Latvia he returned there, remaining for the rest of his life.

== Biography ==
Grigory Iosifovich (later Osipovich) Vinokur was born into a Jewish merchant family. He received his primary education in Warsaw, where he learned to read Russian and Polish. In 1904, the family moved to Moscow, where in 1906 he entered the preparatory class of the private real school of K.K. Mazing, but his interest in the humanities outweighed it, and in 1909 Vinokur transferred to the classical gymnasium of P.N. Strakhov. He learned Greek, German, French and Latin; later he taught himself English and knew Slavic languages. In 1915, he graduated from the gymnasium, but was denied admission to Moscow University due to the percentage norm for Jews. He studied for a year in the chemistry department of the Riga Polytechnic Institute, which was evacuated to Moscow. In 1916, he entered the Moscow University, Slavic-Russian Department of the Faculty of History and Philology. In 1917, he transferred to the newly opened Department of Comparative Linguistics; student of Dmitry Ushakov. From 1918, he began working in parallel in the People's Commissariat for Education (while still a student, after the sudden death of his father, he was forced to tutor ancient languages).

He was close to the Centrifuge group and the near-futuristic publishing house of S. M. Vermel, in one of whose collections he first published about Vladimir Mayakovsky's poem "A Cloud in Trousers", and was published in Lef magazines. Since his student days, he participated in the work of the Moscow Dialectological Commission. In 1920, he interrupted his studies, worked as a translator for the Press Bureau of the Soviet Plenipotentiary Missions in Estonia and Latvia. In 1922, he returned to Moscow and graduated from the university.

He worked as a translator and editor at TASS. One of the founders of the Moscow Linguistic Circle, and its chairman in 1922-1923. In 1923-1924 he was a member of LEF, but broke with the group. He came under the influence of Gustav Shpet's ideas and published his first books at the State Academy of Art Sciences. Since 1934, he has been a member of the Union of Soviet Writers.

In the 1930s, he taught at the Moscow City Pedagogical Institute, Moscow Institute of Philosophy, Literature and History, and since 1942, he was a professor at Moscow State University and head of the Russian Language Department at the Philological Faculty. He taught a number of linguistic disciplines and developed a special course, "Introduction to the Study of Philological Sciences," which he taught in the 1940s, but did not manage to publish the book (Part I was published in 1981). He was popular as a teacher; like his teacher Dmitry Ushakov, he believed that a well-mannered student was more important than a monograph. In the 1990s, Vinokur's students republished almost all of his significant works.

In parallel with teaching, he worked at academic institutes: in 1935-1937 - senior research fellow at the Pushkin House, in 1938-1940 - at the IMLI, in 1941-1943 - at the Institute of Language and Writing, and from 1944 - at the Russian Language Institute. In 1943, he defended his doctoral dissertation.

He was buried at the Vvedenskoye Cemetery.

Vinokur's daughter, Tatyana Grigoryevna (1924-1992), also became a renowned philologist and linguist, a specialist in the stylistics of the Russian language.
