= Alexei Ivanovich Avtonomov =

Russian Red Army military commander (1890–1919)

- Алексе́й Ива́нович Автоно́мов
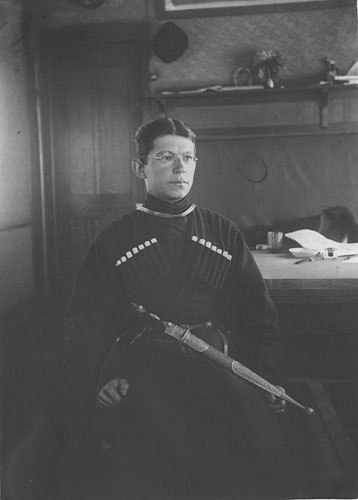
- Alexei Avtonomov, 1919.
- Born: 1890
- Died: 2 February 1919 (aged 28–29)
- Military career
- Allegiance: Russian
- Rank: Commander
- Commands: South-Eastern Revolutionary Army
- Conflicts: Russian Civil War

Alexei Ivanovich Avtonomov (Russian: Алексе́й Ива́нович Автоно́мов; 1890–1919) was a Russian Red Army military commander during the Russian Civil War.

Avtonomov was a Kuban Cossack. He fought in World War I with the rank of Cornet (sub-lieutenant) but rose quickly during the Civil War.

In January 1918, Avtonomov was made Commander of the South-Eastern Revolutionary Army, then based near the city of Tikhoretsk in the Krasnodar Krai.

From 9 to 13 April 1918 Avtonomov led the successful defense of the city of Ekaterinodar in the Kuban area of southern Russia against Kornilov's anti-Soviet Volunteer Army and in which Kornilov was killed.

For a short period in April and May 1918, Avtonomov was commander of the Army of the Northern Caucasus and Chief of the Armed Forces of the Kuban Soviet Republic. He waged a bitter struggle with the civil authorities of the Kuban-Black Sea Soviet Republic, in which he supported the military commanders, including Ivan Sorokin. The dispute was decided in Moscow by the Bolshevik leaders, and Avtonomov was removed from command. His place as head of the Army of the North Caucasus was taken by Major General Andrei Snesarev, who had defected to the Bolsheviks after the October Revolution, and who was replaced in turn by Sorokin.

After this, Avtonomov commanded a detachment in the fighting on the Terek River, and at Svyatoy Krest (Holy Cross, now named Budyonnovsk) in January 1919. He died of typhus on 2 February 1919 during the Red's retreat from the North Caucasus.

== Sources ==
- Denikin, Anton (1922). Russian Turmoil - Memoirs: Military, Social & Political. London.
  - Republished: Hyperion Press. 1973. ISBN 978-0-88355-100-4
  - Republished: Moscow. Airis-Press, 2006. ISBN 5-8112-1890-7 (in Russian)
  - Complete text here (in Russian)
