= Paedology =

Study of children's behavior and development

Paedology (also spelled pedology or paidology) is the study of children's behavior and development.

The field may be considered distinct from pedagogy, the art or science of teaching, and pediatrics, the field of medicine relating to children. However, pedology is not commonly recognized as a distinct field of study; therefore, many people who could be described as pedologists are instead described as pedagogues, pediatricians, psychologists, etc. A reason for this is because one could make contributions to the field of pedology while also making contributions to other fields. For example, Jean Piaget made contributions to the study of pedology in his theories of the cognitive development of children; however, Piaget has more commonly been recognized as a developmental psychologist.

== Origins of paedology ==
The origins of this trend in psychology and pedagogy go back to the end of the 18th century with the separation of a branch of psychology that would form the basis of pedagogy, a pedagogic psychology or "experimental pedagogic psychology", "experimental pedagogy", "experimental education".

G. Stanley Hall (1844–1924) fostered pedology as a separate study, and also became instrumental in the development of modern educational psychology. An American researcher, Oscar Chrisman, proposed the term "pedology" in 1893. At the end of the 19th century, pedology as a comprehensive study of the child came to prominence in Europe as an attempt to create a study of children in the manner of natural sciences. In 1909 Professor Kazimierz Twardowski organized a Pedological Society in Lviv, Austro-Hungary (now Ukraine). In 1910 a similar society was organized in Kraków. In 1911 the first World Congress in Pedology took place in Brussels, Belgium, with attendants from 22 countries.

World War I (1914–1918) effectively put an end to the development of this study in Western Europe.

Since pedology as a branch of science never reached its maturity, there is no common established understanding as to the scope or instruments of pedology.

Bowie State University in Bowie, Maryland became the first university in the United States to offer a bachelor's degree in pedology. A 2014 document from the university refers to "the pedology major (now known as child and adolescent studies)". At many universities in the United States, pedological study is generally classified under the major "child development."

In Russian Empire a prominent developer of the field was Aleksandr Petrovich Nechayev in St. Petersburg, who in 1901 created the laboratory of experimental pedagogical psychology.

== Pedology in the Soviet Union ==
Soviet pedology is traditionally thought to be founded by the efforts of Vladimir Bekhterev; in particular, in 1918 he founded the Institute of Pedology as part of psychological institutions united into the Institute for Study of Brain and Psychical Activity.

This science was intensively pursued in 1920s–1930s in the Soviet Union. A journal Pedologiya ("Педология") was issued. Lev Vygotsky and Pavel Blonsky were among its prominent supporters.

While many works of pedologists were of considerable value, the approach was severely criticized for over-enthusiastic but poorly grounded approach of testing for predicting a child's mental development, in addition to estimating its status.

It was officially condemned in 1936 after a special decree of VKP(b) Central Committee "On Pedological Perversions in the System of Narkomproses" on July 4, 1936.
