= Gymnasium Alexandrinum (Mariupol) =

Cultural property in Ukraine

Coordinates: 47.0943°N 37.5471°E

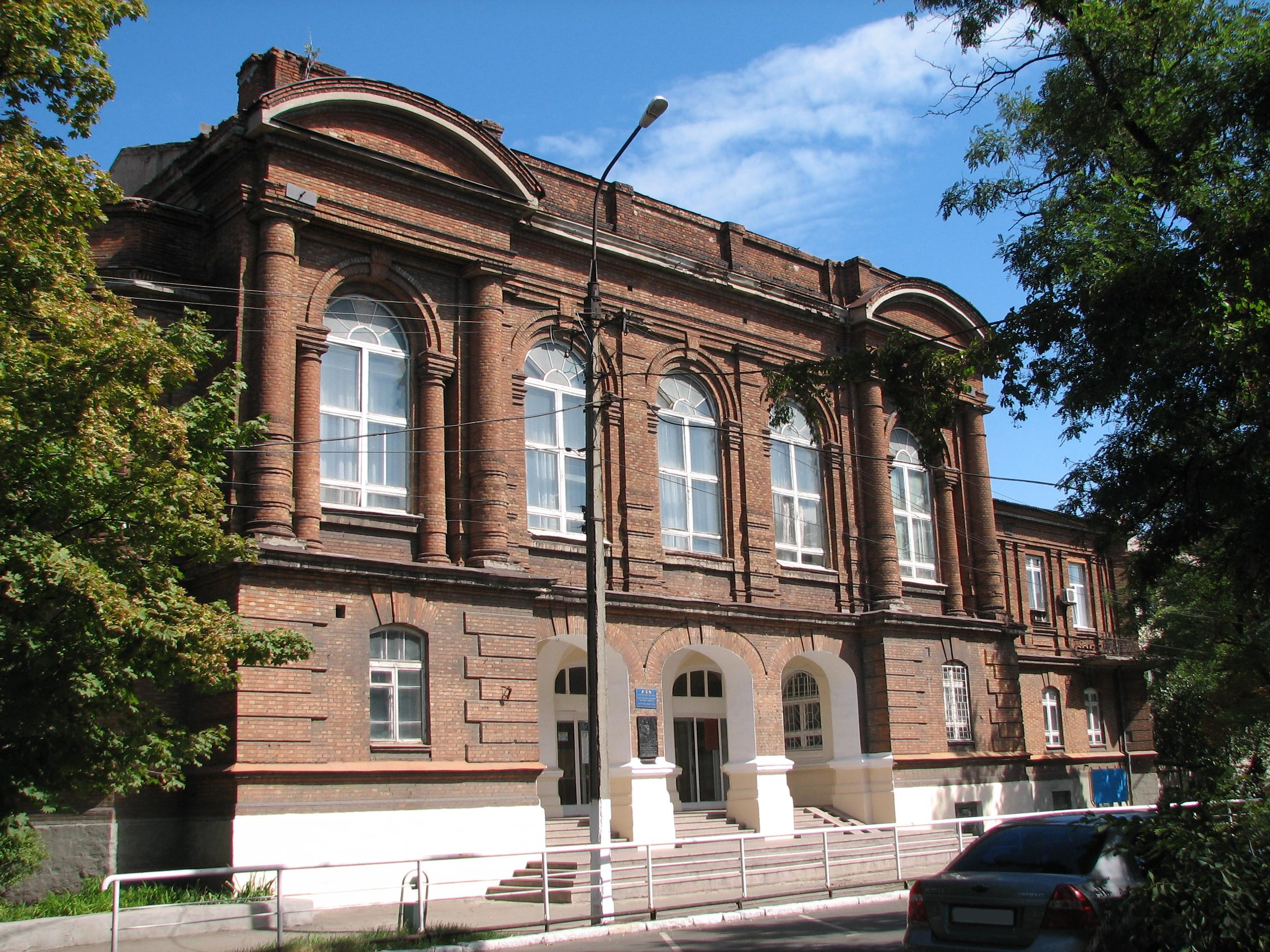
The first boys' gymnasium of Mariupol, founded under the Russian Empire in 1876

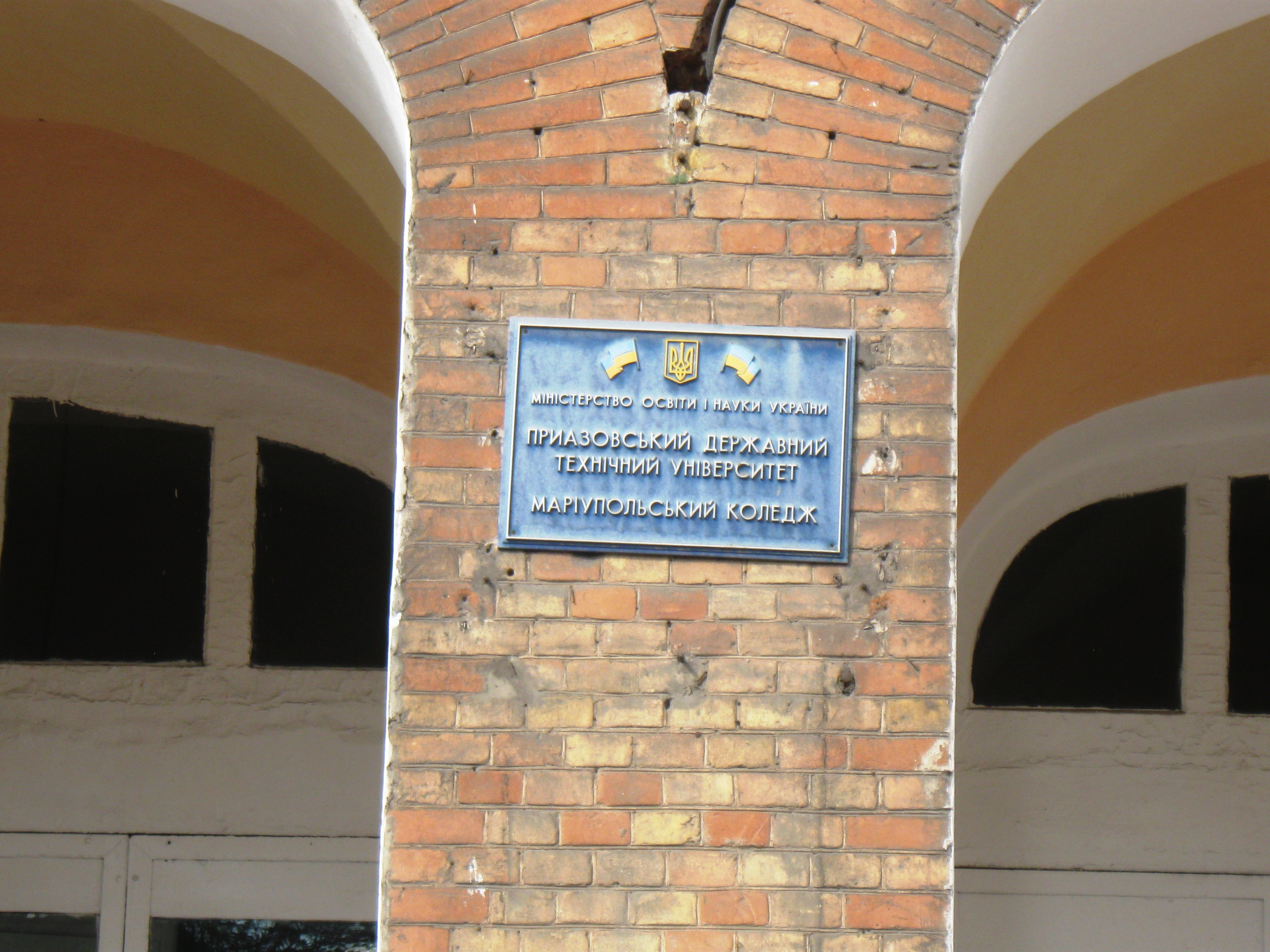
It is a cultural property of a historical place indexed in the Ukrainian heritage register under the reference 14-123-0007 .

The Gymnasium Alexandrinum in Mariupol, Ukraine, is a cultural property of a historical place indexed in the Ukrainian heritage register under the reference 14-123-0007. It was the first boys' gymnasium of Mariupol. The gymnasium was built in 1876 upon the initiative of the Russian Emperor Alexander II of Russia. The building was named after Emperor Alexander II. It was built and designed by the architect Mykola Tolvinski (1857–1924).
