= Ion Vinokur =

Ukrainian archaeologist and historian

Ion (Srulievich/ Israelivich) Vinokur (4 July 1930 – 19 September 2006) was a Ukrainian archaeologist, historian, professor, academician, known for his research of Chernyakhiv (Chernyakhov) culture and the history of the ancient Slavs. Within his academic career he had written around 40 books and over 400 further scientific articles and materials.

== Biography ==
Ion Vinokur was born to a Jewish family in Ryzhyn (Zhytomyr oblast, Ukraine). His father Srul (Israel) Gershkovich was a carpenter and his mother Maria Haimovna was a housewife. In 1936 the family moved to a bigger city Zhytomyr in order to give kids good education. Ion had a 4 years older sister Genya. During the World War II the family escaped to Ashgabad (Turkmenistan), where Ion Vinokur had spent the time between 1941 and 1944. Having returned to Zhytomyr after the war, Ion Vinokur started his university education on historical faculty of Chernivtsy State University named after Yurii Fedkovich. There he met Boris Tymoshchuk, renown archeologist and museum worker, who had played an important role in the choice of the future path for young Ion and strengthened his interest in archaeology.

In 1953, having graduated from the University, he returned to Zhytomyr, where he had worked in the regional historical museum and had been organising historical events and archaeological excavations. At this period of time Ion Vinokur had published his first articles and had lectured on archaeology as invited lecturer at the city's University. In 1957, Ion Vinokur returned to Chernivtsy University as head of the University's museum and lecturer of the course on museum management. In 1962 at the age of 32 he got his PhD in historical science from Institute of Archaeology of the Academy of Sciences of USSR in Leningrad (St. Petersburg). His first book had been published the same year.

In early 1963, Ion Vinokur moved to Kamyanets-Podilskiy where he had been working for 42 years at the Kamyanets-Podilskiy State University, the majority of the time as head of the faculty of history of Slavs and special historical disciplines. In 1963 Ion Vinokur had founded the annual excavation practice, that had turned into the serious systemic activity in the region, which had not been the case before and which has been lasting for the 50 years now. In the 1960s Ion Vinokur had been studying settlements and graves of the Chernyakhiv culture, in the 1970s he had focussed on the famous Bakota mentioned in ancient Slavic records and had discovered transitional settlements from Chernyakhiv culture to early Eastern Slavs. This research proved that despite opinions of some scientists there had been no break between the population continuity in the Dnipro-Dnister area (beds of two big rivers Dnipro (Dnepr) and Dnistro (Dnestr) and Chernyakhiv culture evolved into the early Eastern Slavic one.

In 1978, Ion Vinokur defended his Professor's thesis devoted to the history of Chernyakhiv culture. In 1980 he got the Professor title. Further years had been devoted to the excavations and a unique discovery that has a meaning for the overall European history - the first Slavic jewelry workshop. Based on this research a further book on Slavic Jewelry has been published in 1997. In the further years Ion Vinokur had been continuing active academic and excavation work, including publication of the widely used in Ukraine school book on Ancient and Middle Ages history of Ukraine. In 2000s Ion Vinokur studied Gubyn - one more famous city mentioned in Slavic records and connected to the Bolokhiv culture. In 1997 he was elected as Academician. His last years he had spent with Slavistic University in Kyiv as head of ethnographic faculty.

Ion Vinokur had founded a number of important organisations and associations devoted to ancient history and archaeology, including Ukrainian national ethnographic association. He had been actively taking part in the development of the next generation of archaeologists and historians, by overseeing numerous PhD students and being the member of the Committee granting scientific titles at Institute of Archaeology of Ukrainian Academy of Sciences. He had played a vital role in gaining the status of Historical Heritage for Kamyanets-Podilskiy. Ion Vinokur had been actively speaking at numerous scientific events including international ones. His works had been published in Moscow, St. Petersburg, Krakow, Lublin, Sofia and Berlin.

He died in 2006 at Kyiv, Ukraine.

== Selected bibliography ==
- 1956 - Archaeological monuments of Zhytomyr
- 1958 - Archaeological and historical monument in Chernivtsy - the former residence of archbishops of Bukovina
- 1958 - What a young tourist should now about historical and archaeological monuments of Bukovina
- 1960 - The ancient monuments of the Eastern Volyn, I century AD
- 1965 - Archaeological monuments of Khmelnytskiy area - lectures to help students
- 1966 - The culture of population of Dnister area in I century AD. Lectures
- 1968 - Kamyanets-Podilskiy. Historical and architectural overview
- 1972 - History and culture of chernyakhiv tribes of the Dnipro-Dnister area]
- 1977 - Ancient Slavs of the Dnister area
- 1984 - Guide to archaeology of Ukraine - Khmelnytskiy, Chernyvtsy, Transcarpathian areas
- 1990 - History of Podillya
- 1994 - Archaeology of Ukraine. Textbook for Universities
- 1996 - Ancient and middle age history of Ukraine, school book
- 1997 - Archaeology of the kozak era
- 1997 - Slavic jewelers of the Dnister area
- 2000 - Chernyakhiv culture: origins, history and destiny
