= Yevgeni Kornilov =

Russian footballer

Personal information
- Full name: Yevgeni Vladimirovich Kornilov
- Date of birth: 13 August 1985 (age 41)
- Place of birth: Taganrog, Russian SFSR
- Height: 1.83 m (6 ft 0 in)
- Position: Defender

Youth career
- OKSDYuShOR-13 Taganrog

Senior career*
Years	Team	Apps	(Gls)
2003–2005	FC Rostov	0	(0)
2006–2008	FC Taganrog	89	(1)
2009	FC MVD Rossii Moscow	15	(0)
2009–2010	FC Chernomorets Novorossiysk	43	(2)
2011–2012	FC Neftekhimik Nizhnekamsk	18	(0)
2012–2016	FC Chernomorets Novorossiysk	109	(4)
2016	FC Chayka Peschanokopskoye	15	(1)
- * Club domestic league appearances and goals

Yevgeni Vladimirovich Kornilov (Russian: Евгений Владимирович Корнилов; born 13 August 1985) is a former Russian professional football player.

== Club career ==
He made his debut for FC Rostov on 31 July 2004 in a Russian Cup game against FC Sodovik Sterlitamak. He also appeared for Rostov in the next Russian Cup season on 13 July 2005 in a game against FC Luch-Energiya Vladivostok.

He played in the Russian Football National League for FC MVD Rossii Moscow and FC Chernomorets Novorossiysk in 2009.
