= Evgeny Vinokurov =

Russian economist

- Евгений Винокуров
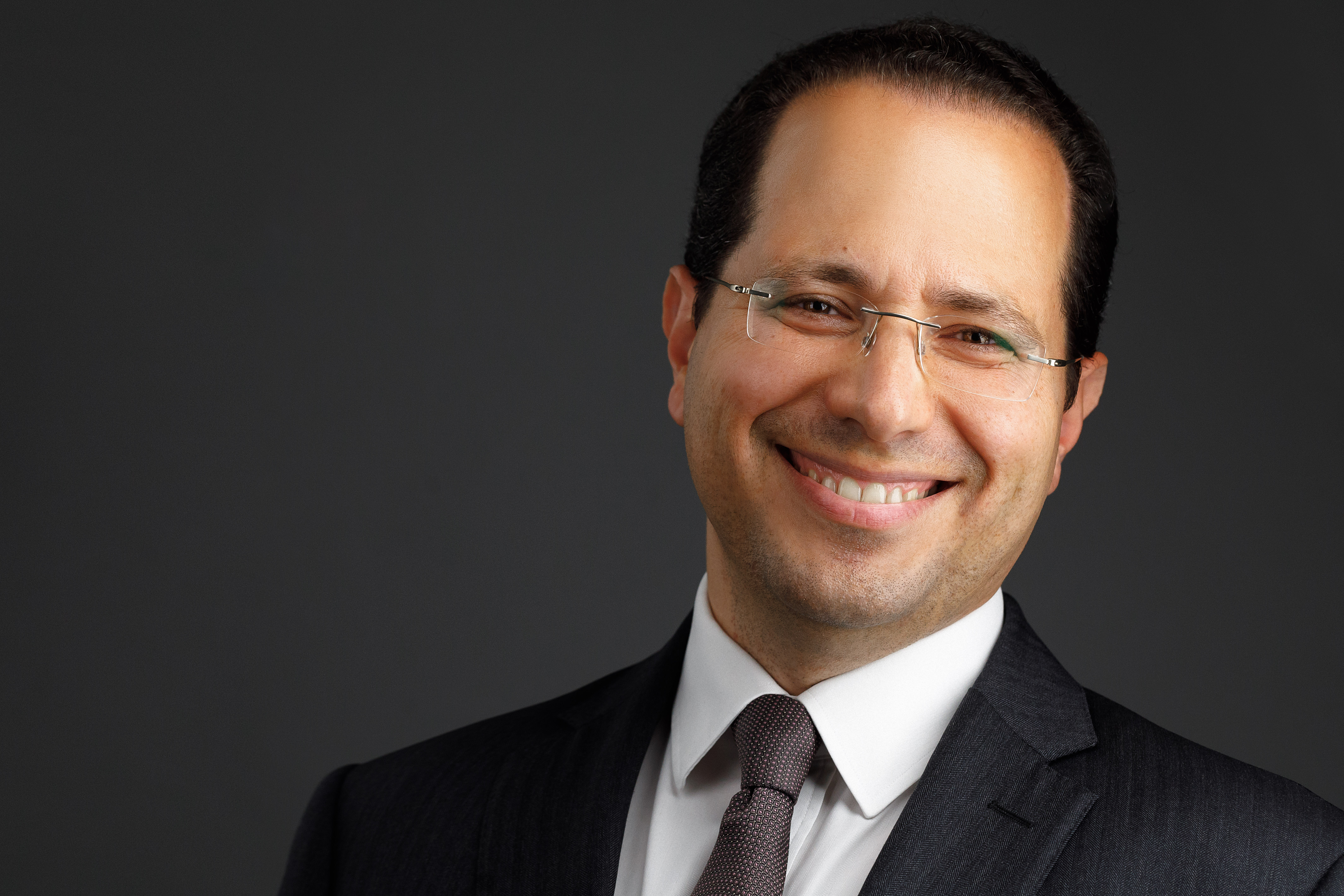
- Vinokurov in 2019
- Born: 6 October 1975 (age 50); Kaliningrad, USSR
- Scientific career
- Fields: Economics
- Institutions: Eurasian Development Bank

Notes
- Vinokurov's personal website at http://www.vinokurov.info

Vinokurov, Evgeny (born 6 October 1975) is a Russian economist, currently serving as the Chief Economist at Eurasian Development Bank. His research is in macroeconomics, infrastructure, regional integration, global financial and economic architecture, and international organizations.

He holds a Ph.D. (doktor nauk) in economy from the Institute of World Economy and International Relations (IMEMO) of the Russian Academy of Sciences, Moscow; a Ph.D. from Pierre Mendes-France University (Grenoble II), and M.iur. from Göttingen University. After several years of experience in applied economy research projects at the Centre for European Policy Studies (CEPS), Catholic University of Leuven and the University of Jena he proceeded to working with the Eurasian Development Bank (EDB), being responsible for macro- and sectoral analysis in particular, as well as the development bank's nascent research program.

Founding director of the EDB Centre for Integration Studies since 2011 until 2018. Over these years, EDB Centre for Integration Studies has published 50 reports on such issues as Eurasian integration, macroeconomics, investments, trade, cross-border infrastructure, labour migration and remittances, and the public perception of integration. All of the centre's reports are publicly available, open-access resources.

Since 2018 Vinokurov served as the Chief Economist of the Eurasian Fund for Stabilization and Development. The EFSD primarily provides budget and balance of payment support loans as well as large-scale infrastructure investment loans to its member states. The Chief Economist Group provides research in macro- and microeconomic issues with the focus on macroeconomic stability, fiscal sustainability, and debt sustainability of the EFSD member states. It also covers global and regional economic trends and various issues related to the global economic and financial architecture.

Since 2023 he is Vice Chairman and Chief Economist at the Eurasian Development Bank responsible for economic analysis, knowledge creation and management, international relations, ESG, and EDB Academy.

Vinokurov is the author and editor of 19 books, and a member of such professional bodies as International Studies Association and the American Economic Association.

== Academic Interests ==
He devoted several years to studying enclaves and exclaves. The main research findings are reflected in the books "A Theory of Enclaves", "Kaliningrad: Enclaves and Economic Integration", and "Adapting to European Integration? The Case of the Russian Exclave Kaliningrad". "A Theory of Enclaves" was also published in Russian. The study is built on the analysis of an extensive database that covers over 280 enclaves and exclaves. Enclaves are a fairly frequent phenomenon. The role of the enclaves as a generator of conflicts between motherland and surrounding states (e.g., Britain and Spain in the case of Gibraltar, Russia and the European Union in the case of Kaliningrad, Spain and Morocco in the case of Ceuta and Melilla) is of particular interest. A theory of enclaves provides the answers to two fundamental questions: what factors determine the enclaves' sovereign belonging (ethnic composition of the population) and what economic policies can ensure their successful sustainable economic development (economic openness).

Starting from 2003, Vinokurov has been engaged in studying economic and political integration. His interest in the Russian-European vector led to the publication of the book "The CIS, the EU, and Russia: The Challenges of Integration". Since 2006, while working in the EDB, Vinokurov focused on the issues of economic integration in the post-Soviet space and Eurasia. In 2007 Vinokurov became the editorial board member of the International Journal of Economic Policy in Emerging Economies. In 2008 he launched and became the editor of the EDB Eurasian Integration Yearbook (in English) and the quarterly research and analytical Journal of Eurasian Economic Integration (in Russian), published by the EDB until 2013 and 2015, respectively.

In 2009 he headed the international research group and published the EDB System of Indicators for the Eurasian Integration (SIEI), a complex system of comprehensive monitoring of statistics and dynamics of regional integration in the CIS region with the use of a specialized economic toolkit. Together with A. Libman they also developed a theory of holding-together regionalism to explain the patterns of regional re-integration processes (relevant for the explanation of integration patterns not only in the post-Soviet space but also in Africa and some other regions).

His research focused on integration processes on the Eurasian continent, spanning the European Union, the Eurasian Economic Union, Central Asia, Eastern Asia, and South Asia. In a nutshell, it provides a coherent view of Eurasian continental integration. The concept of Eurasian continental integration was the subject of the book "Eurasian Integration: Challenges of Transcontinental Regionalism", written together with A. Libman.

"Re-Evaluating Regional Organizations: Behind the Smokescreen of Official Mandates", was also co-authored with A. Libman and published by Palgrave Macmillan in 2017. It introduces the new database of 62 regional international organizations with up to 130 various parameters for each one of them. This monograph pursues two research questions: first, why do regional organizations demonstrate such remarkable resilience even when they do not achieve their declared goals? Second, what factors actually determine the goal-setting and how do they evolve over the life of the regional organization?

“Introduction to the Eurasian Economic Union”, was published by Palgrave Macmillan in 2018. It represents a concise survey of various aspects of the functioning of the EAEU – from its history and institutions to the analysis of the common markets and the external economic relations. “One Eurasia or Many? Regional Interconnections and Connectivity Projects on the Eurasian Continent”, a book on the institutional cooperation setting and connectivity across the Eurasian continent, was written together with A. Libman and published by George Washington University in 2021. A comprehensive handbook, “The Elgar Companion to the Eurasian Economic Union”, followed in 2024.

In “The Economy of Central Asia: A New Look” (2022), Vinokurov argued that the economic role and prospects of Central Asia were not yet fully understood due to inertia. Over the past 20 years, the GDP of Central Asian countries has increased sevenfold (surpassing the $500 billion mark in 2024). The region is countering its landlocked status by building transport corridors and pipelines not only in the traditional east–west direction, but also in the north–south direction, reaching South Asia and the Arab Gulf. A series of fundamental studies on Central Asian energy, water, irrigation and transport corridors complemented “The Economy of Central Asia…” and paved the way for better management of common Central Asian challenges.

In a series of publications, the EDB research team led by Vinokurov formulated the concept of the Eurasian Transport Network. The ETN is a system of interconnected latitudinal and longitudinal international transport corridors and routes that facilitate intra- and transcontinental connectivity. Building upon over 50,000 km of existing east–west and north–south transport corridors, it links Asia, Europe, and the Middle East. There are two main ideas behind the concept. Firstly, the new north–south routes should complement the well-established east–west connections by linking Eurasia to South Asia and the Gulf. Secondly, such interconnections generate synergies, which could result in up to 40% additional freight traffic.

Following the exposure of systemic weaknesses in the global financial architecture by the 2020 COVID pandemic, Vinokurov and Levenkov proposed a revision of the Global Financial Safety Net (GFSN). The GFSN consists of national reserves, the IMF, bilateral swap arrangements, and regional financial mechanisms. The essence of the proposed concept of an Enlarged GFSN is to add two elements: anti-crisis financing from multilateral development banks and bilateral financial support. It also aims to ensure the coordination of financing provision across all six sources, a need which became evident when ensuring macroeconomic stability in the face of the pandemic.

In a series of subsequent papers, Vinokurov and Grichik proposed a radical change to the current international reserve system. The underlying issue is a loss of trust in the current reserve management system. They called for security to be chosen as the underlying guiding principle. They listed 12 options ranging from current trade-offs to outright revolutionary approaches. The first group implies that countries could expand their use of existing instruments, such as investments in gold and renminbi, and increase their network of swap arrangements. The second group of options calls for the introduction of new mechanisms for international reserve functions, such as the accumulation of physical resources and private cryptocurrencies, the issuance of stablecoins by central banks, and the building up of assets in regional financing arrangements. The third group includes options to shift to the energy standard paradigm, establish a synthetic international currency, or form a macroeconomic paradigm in which infrastructure investment would be the preferred means of securing future economic stability.

== Publications ==
=== Books ===
Libman A., Vinokurov E. (Eds.) (2024) The Edward Elgar Companion to the Eurasian Economic Union. Edward Elgar: London. ISBN 978-1-80037-499-7.
Libman A., Vinokurov E. (2021) One Eurasia or Many? Regional Interconnections and Connectivity Projects on the Eurasian Continent. — Washington DC: The George Washington University, Central Asia Program. ISBN 978-0-578-86820-2.
Vinokurov E. (2018) Introduction to the Eurasian Economic Union. Basingstoke and New York: Palgrave Macmillan.
Vinokurov E., Libman A. (2017) Re-Evaluating Regional Organizations: Behind the Smokescreen of Official Mandates. Basingstoke and New York: Palgrave Macmillan.
Vinokurov E. (ed.) (2014) System of Indicators of Eurasian Integration II. St. Petersburg: EDB.
Vinokurov E. (ed.) (2013) EDB Eurasian Integration Yearbook 2013. Almaty: EDB.
Vinokurov E., Libman A. (2012) Eurasian Integration: Challenges of Transcontinental Regionalism. Basingstoke and New York: Palgrave Macmillan.
Libman A., Vinokurov E. (2012) Holding-Together Regionalism: Twenty Years of the Post-Soviet Integration. Basingstoke and New York: Palgrave Macmillan.
Vinokurov E., Libman A. (2012) Еurasian Continental Integration. St. Petersburg: EDB. In Russian.
Vinokurov E. (ed.) (2012) EDB Eurasian Integration Yearbook 2012. Almaty: EDB.
Vinokurov E. (ed.) (2011) EDB Eurasian Integration Yearbook 2011. Almaty: EDB.
Vinokurov E. (ed.) (2010) EDB Eurasian Integration Yearbook 2010. Almaty: EDB.
Vinokurov E. (ed.) (2009) The System of Indicators of Eurasian Integration. Almaty: EDB.
Vinokurov E. (ed.) (2009) EDB Eurasian Integration Yearbook 2009. Almaty: EDB.
Vinokurov E. (ed.) (2008) EDB Eurasian Integration Yearbook 2008. Almaty: EDB.
Gaenzle S., Muentel G., Vinokurov E. (eds.) (2008) Adapting to European Integration? The Case of the Russian Exclave Kaliningrad. Manchester: Manchester University Press.
Vinokurov E. (2007) A Theory of Enclaves. Lanham, MD: Lexington Books.
Vinokurov E. (2007) Kaliningrad: Enclaves and Economic Integration. Brussels: CEPS.
Malfliet K., Verpoest L., Vinokurov E. (eds.) (2007) The CIS, the EU, and Russia: Challenges of Integration. London: Palgrave Macmillan.
Vinokurov E. (2002) Together with Kant. Philosophical Foundations of a Global World Order. Kaliningrad: KGU (in Russian).

=== Selected Papers and Reports ===
Vinokurov, E. (ed.) (2024) The Eurasian Transport Network. Reports 24/6. Almaty: Eurasian Development Bank.
Vinokurov, E. (ed.), Ahunbaev, A., Chuyev, S., Adakhayev, A., Sarsembekov, T. (2023) Efficient Irrigation and Water Conservation in Central Asia. Reports 23/4. Almaty: Eurasian Development Bank.
Vinokurov, E. (ed.) (2023). Cross-Border Public-Private Partnerships. Almaty: Eurasian Development Bank. EDB Report 2023/3.
Vinokurov, E. et al. (2022) The Economy of Central Asia: A New Look. EDB Report 2022/3. Almaty, Bishkek, Moscow: Eurasian Development Bank.
Vinokurov, E., Ahunbaev, A., Usmanov, N., Zaboev, A. (2022) International North–South Transport Corridor: Investments and Soft Infrastructure. Report 2022/2. Almaty, Moscow: Eurasian Development Bank.
Vinokurov E., Grichik M., Tsukarev T. (2022) New Approaches to International Reserves: the Lack of Credibility of Reserves Currencies. Russian Journal of Economics, 8(4): 315–332. DOI: 10.32609/j.ruje.8.98242.
Vinokurov E., Grichik M. (2022) A New Concept of International Reserves: Security, Diversification, Unorthodox Approaches. Voprosy Ekonomiki. 12:24-43 (in Russian).
Vinokurov E. Y., Levenkov A. S. (2021) The global financial safety net: Evolution of the anti-crisis function in the global financial architecture // Voprosy Ekonomiki. — 2021;(5):26-42. (In Russian) — ISSN 0042-8736. — doi:10.32609/0042-8736-2021-5-26-42.
Libman A., Stone R., Vinokurov E. (2021) Russian Power and State-Owned Enterprise. European Journal of Political Economy. Vol. 73, Issue C.
Vinokurov E., Levenkov A. (2021) The Enlarged Global Financial Safety Net. Global Policy. Vol. 12, no. 1.
Vinokurov E. (2020) Interaction of Eurasian and international financial institutions. Post-Communist Economies. Vol. 33, no. 2–3.
Vinokurov E. (2019) The Belt and Road Initiative: A Russian Perspective. In: Kohli, H., Linn, J., Zucker L. (eds.) China's Belt and Road Initiative: Potential Transformation of Central Asia and the South Caucasus. SAGE Publications Inc.
Lissovolik Y., Vinokurov E. (2019) Extending BRICS to BRICS+: Potential for Development Finance, Connectivity, and Financial Stability. Area Development and Policy, 4(2): 117–133.
Libman A., Vinokurov E. (2018) Autocracies and Regional Integration: the Eurasian Case. Post-Communist Economies.
Vinokurov E., Tsukarev T. (2018) The Belt and Road Initiative and the Interests of Transit Countries: an Economic Assessment of Transport Corridors. Area Development and Policy, 3: 1: 93–113.
Vinokurov E., Libman A. (2018) Eurasian Integration and its Institutions: Do They Serve to Provide Security in Eurasia? In: Bordachev T., Dutkiewicz P., Lukyanov F., Sakwa R. (eds.) Eurasia on the Edge. Lexington Books, Lanham, MD.
Vinokurov E. (2017) The Eurasian Economic Union: Current State and Preliminary Results. Russian Journal of Economics. Vol. 3 (1): 54–70.
Vinokurov E. (2016) Unter Partnern. Ein nüchterner Blick auf die Eurasische Wirtschaftsunion. Osteuropa, 5: 129-140 (in German)
Vinokurov E. (2016) Eurasian Economic Union: A Sober Look. Voprosy Ekonomiki. No. 12
Vinokurov E., Libman A. (2014) Do Economic Crises Impede or Advance Regional Economic Integration in the Post-Soviet Space?. Post-Communist Economies. Vol. 26 (3): 341–358.
Vinokurov E. (2014) Emerging Eurasian Continental Integration: Trade, Investments, and Infrastructure. Global Journal of Emerging Market Economies. Vol. 6(1): 69–93.
Vinokurov E. (2014) A Mega Deal Amid a Relationship Crisis. Russia in Global Affairs. No. 4.
Libman A., Vinokurov E. (2012) Post-Soviet integration and the interaction of functional bureaucracies. Review of International Political Economy. Vol. 19(5): 867–894
Libman A., Vinokurov E. (2012) Eurasian Economic Union: Why Now? Will It Work? Is It Enough? Whitehead Journal of Diplomacy and International Relations. Summer issue.
Libman A., Vinokurov E. (2012) Regional Integration and Economic Convergence in the Post-Soviet Space: Experience of a Decade of Growth. Journal of Common Market Studies. Vol. 50. Number 1. pp. 112–128.
Libman A., Vinokurov E. (2011) Is it really different? Patterns of regionalisation in the post-Soviet Central Asia. Post-Communist Economies, 23 (4), pp. 469–492.
Vinokurov E., Libman A. (2010) Post-Soviet Regional Integration Trends: Results of Quantitative Analysis, Voprosy Economiki, July.
Vinokurov E., Libman A., Maqsimchook N. (2010) Dynamika integracionnykh processov v Centralnoy Azii [The Dynamics of Integration Processes in Central Asia]. Journal of Eurasian Economic Integration. Vol. 2 (7): 5-32. (In Russian).
Vinokurov E. Libman A. (2009) Systema indikatorov evraziyskoy integracii: osnovnye vyvody [The System of Indicators of Eurasian Integration: Main Findings], Journal of Eurasian Economic Integration, Vol. 4 (5): 38–57. (In Russian).
Vinokurov E., Jadraliyev M., Shcherbanin Y. (2009). The EurAsEC Transport Corridors. EDB Sector Report no.5. April. Almaty: EDB.
Vinokurov E. (2009) Mutual Investment in The CIS Banking Sector, The Euromoney Central Asia & CEE Financial Markets Handbook 2009/10, Euromoney, pp. 4–9.
Vinokurov E. (2008) The CIS Common Electric Power Market. EDB Industry Report no.3. Almaty: EDB.
Vinokurov E. (2008) Nuclear Complexes of Russia and Kazakhstan: Prospects of Development and Cooperation. EDB Industry Report no.1. Almaty: EDB.
Samson I., Lamande V., and Vinokurov E. (2004) Measuring Regional Economic Development in Russia: The Case of the Kaliningrad Oblast, in: European Urban and Regional Studies, (11)1:71-8.
Lamande V., Vinokurov E. (2003) Trade in Kaliningrad Oblast, Problems of Economic Transition, (46)6: 56–72.
