= Tania Vinokur =

Israeli violinist

- Born: February 25, 1982 (age 44); Chișinău, Moldavian SSR, Soviet Union (Now Moldova)
- Genres: World music, flamenco
- Occupations: Violinist, flamenco dancer
- Instrument: Violin
- Years active: 2001–present
- Website: taniav.com

Tania Vinokur (born February 25, 1982) is a Moldovan-born Israeli violinist, dancer and singer. Based in Israel, Vinokur is best known for performing fusions of world music and theatrical movement.

== Biography and education ==
=== Early life ===
Tania Vinokur was born in 1982 in Chișinău, Moldova (formerly part of the Soviet Union), the second of two children from Celene Vinokur, a cellist and piano tuner, and Rita Vinokur. Vinokur began studying classical ballet in Russia at the age of 3 and classical violin at the age of 4, debuting on the stage at age 4.

Vinokur immigrated with her family to the city of Rehovot in 1990. She continued both her ballet and violin studies in Rehovot, attending violin lessons at the Petah Tikva Conservatory.

Between school passageways and school crossings, Vinokur was offered a test to advanced classes and went straight to fourth grade. In the same year, she started jazz and modern ballet classes, joined the youth orchestra. A year later she began her first steps in flamenco dancing.

Vinokur began performing at the age of 12 when she joined dance groups. At the age of 14, she was invited to perform with orchestras around the world. She began playing flamenco with violin and dancing in concerts while attending high school.

=== Education and training ===
Tania attended the Music Academy Buchmann Mehta in Tel Aviv, Israel from 1999 to 2001. In 2001, she placed 3rd in the Adi Foundation Flamenco Competition and receiving a one year scholarship in Spain. From 2001 to 2002, Tania studied Flamenco studies at the Fondation Cristina Haran–Flamenco Academy in Seville. Together with two other dancers she was chosen to study with the great maestro Manolo Soler for six months. Additionally, she played violin with Gypsy flamenco bands and recorded an album of Bach music in flamenco rhythms with Miriam Mendes and produced by EMI. This project inspired and pushed her to publish her fusion compositions, combining world styles while exploring the sources of each genre. After recording this album, she was invited to tour the project. During the tour, she saw a performance by Israeli dance troupe Mayumana. She auditioned, and passed, the next day, subsequently joining the group.

== Professional career ==
In 2002, Tania recorded an album, "Bach Por Flamenco" with Miriam Mendes, produced by EMI. After recording, she auditioned for the band Mayumana, and joined the group the next day. From 2002 to 2011, she performed with Mayumana in Israel and abroad: Mayumana, Bakhontos with David Broza, Infected Mushroom, and Achinoam Nini.

In 2003, Tania produced a Spanish evening at the Tel Aviv Port where she performs weekly with a team of musicians. The evening's success spreads very quickly and various artists call to participate. This marks the beginning of Vinokur's production career as she begins to invite various artists to visit her every week. She hosts two live performances every week, ultimately creating the show that later became known as Cinco 5.

On December 12, 2006, Cinco 5's first show premiered with 5 female characters as its central focus. The first performances pivoted around Vinokur playing the violin, dancing the flamenco, drumming on the cajón, and singing, marking the first time she combined all her artistic skills for a public performance. The show served as a fusion of the classical world, flamenco rhythms, Latin groove, choreography combined with video art, and flamenco dance, combining with the modern movement, scenery, original arrangements, and a full hall. Three months later, the show was invited to perform at the Tzavta Theater in Tel Aviv and was officially named "Cinco 5." In addition to Vinokur, the cast expanded to five musicians and four dancers. The arrangement now combined not only classic flamenco but also the world of tango, oriental music, and Latin jazz, combined with video art and live dance. The show also featured distinguished guests Leonid Ptashka and David Broza. That same year, Cinco 5 was also performed at the Suzanne Dellal Festival at the Suzanne Dellal Center, the Sea of Galilee Festival in Herzliya, and the Jerusalem Theater. The show also entered the school system for performances in schools, as well as in the field of music and dance. Ultimately, Cinco 5 served as a form of flamenco fusion theater. Cinco 5 continues to operate today in the important principle of combining styles, cultures and arts, as well as emphasizing their accessibility to the Israeli viewer.

Tania was invited to perform at 2008's Festiladino with Baldi Olier and the Israel Broadcasting Authority Orchestra. In 2009, Tania worked with the Yiddishpiel theater. The same year, Tania also guested on David Broza's show.

In 2010, she performed in Maholohet for the annual SummerDance festival. In April 2013, Vinokur launched her project SHINE, its goal being to create new and original material that combines world music with different rhythms and innovative sound.

In 2015, Tania performed at the Times of Israel Gala.

Tania performed her violin and flamenco fusion at 2017's TEDx Jaffa. In 2018, Tania performed at Cafe Gibralter with Ophir Toubul. The same year, she performed with pianist Leonid Patschka as part of the second concert in the Urban Conservatory's "Jazz World" series from the Rehovot Municipal Society. Tania also performed at the "Pearls of Music" at Empey Azrieli.

In 2019, she performed at Centro Sefarad-Israel in Madrid. Tzachi Halevy guested on her 2019 EP launch show.

Tania also celebrated the 2019 launch of her album "In Time" with a show at the Tel Aviv Regional Club.

== Discography ==
- Paseo
- Cuerdas
- Buleria A
- 2X2
- Abanico
- Te Quiero
- Shine
- I Can
- Mamaliga
