= Yaroslav Vynokur =

Personal information
- Born: 6 June 1974 (age 52) Odesa, Ukrainian SSR

Pool career

Tournament wins
- World Champion: Pyramid (2003)

Yaroslav Yuriiovych Vynokur (Ukrainian: Ярослав Юрійович Винокур; born 6 June 1974, Odesa, Ukrainian SSR) is a professional Russian billiards player from Ukraine. He is a two-time Ukraine and World Champion. Besides Russian billiards, he also plays American pool.

He is also the joint owner of the billiards club "Odyn" (Ukrainian: Один, lit. 'One') in Odesa, which is the largest billiards club in Ukraine. It measures 1,500 square metres and offers Russian billiards, pool and snooker.

== Achievements ==
- 2004 Russian Pyramid Ukraine Championship
- 2003 WPA World Pyramid Championship
- 2004 Russian Pyramid Ukraine Championship
- 2003 Russian Pyramid Eurasia Championship
- 2002 Russian Pyramid Asia Open Cup
