= Fortunatov's law =

Sound shift in Sanskrit

Fortunatov's law is the observation, in the development of Indo-Aryan from Proto-Indo-European, that when *l is followed by a dental consonant, the dental becomes retroflex and the *l is deleted, eg. PIE *bʰelsos > Sanskrit bhā́ṣā, Lithuanian bal̃sas; PIE *poltos > Sanskrit paṭa, Greek péltē, Farsi parde; PIE *geldos, Sanskrit jaḍa, English cold; PIE *kol(h₂)dos, Sanskrit kaḍa, Norwegian halt. Exception: PIE *pl̥th₂-éwih₂, Sanskrit pṛthvī́.

== See also ==
- Glossary of sound laws in the Indo-European languages
- Glottalic theory
- Grassmann's law
- Stigler's law of eponymy
