= Avtonom =

Russian masculine given name

Avtonom (Russian: Автоно́м) is a Russian Christian male first name. Its feminine version is Avtonoma. The name is derived from the Greek word autonomous, meaning one living by one's own laws. "Avtonom" continued to be a form used by the Russian Orthodox Church, having replaced an earlier form Autonom (Аутоно́м).

Its colloquial variant is Avtomon (Автомо́н).

The diminutives of "Avtonom" are Avtonomka (Автоно́мка), Avtom (Авто́м), Avtoma (Авто́ма), Toma (То́ма), Avtya (А́втя), and Noma (Но́ма).

The patronymics derived from "Avtonom" are "Автоно́мович" (Avtonomovich; masculine) and its colloquial form "Автоно́мыч" (Avtonomych), and "Автоно́мовна" (Avtonomovna; feminine).

Last names derived from this first name include Avtonomov and Antomanov.

== People with this first name ==
- Avtonom Golovin (1667–1720), Russian military leader
- Avtonom Ivanov (died 1907), Russian Duma clerk
- Avtonom Vylkov (1876–1952), Romanian priest

== Sources ==
- Superanskaya, A. V. (2005). Словарь русских имён [Dictionary of Russian Names] (in Russian). Moscow: Издательство Эксмо. ISBN 5-699-14090-5.
