= Pavel Blonsky =

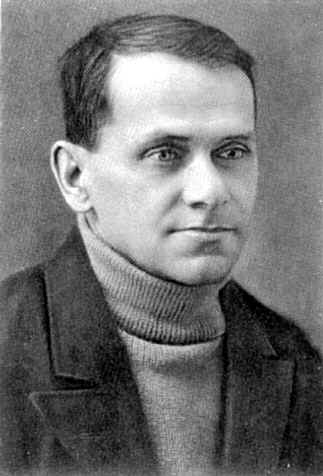
- Born: May 26, 1884; Kyiv, Russian Empire
- Died: February 15, 1941 (aged 56); Moscow, Soviet Union
- Education: Imperial Moscow University (1910)
- Known for: Being a founder of Soviet paedology
- Scientific career
- Fields: Psychology; philosophy; pedagogy
- Workplaces: Moscow State University

Pavel Petrovich Blonsky (Russian: Павел Петрович Блонский; May 26 [O.S. May 14], 1884 – February 15, 1941) was a Russian Soviet psychologist, philosopher, and founder of Soviet paedology.

== Life and work ==
Blonsky was born in 1884 in Kyiv, then a part of the Russian empire, to a local government official. He was educated firstly at the Second Kyiv Classical Gymnasium, before attending the Kyiv University of St. Volodymyr in 1902. After graduating from the classics department in the fields of history and philosophy, he found employment in teaching positions and scientific endeavors.

Blonsky became steadily involved in the burgeoning Russian socialist movement, specifically with the Bolsheviks, which led to periods of imprisonment and repression throughout his early career.

In 1913, he became a Privatdozent at Moscow University upon obtaining his masters degree, and began traveling to deliver lectures on related subjects. He began to develop his thoughts on education during this time, and debated its intended purpose for the working class. He began to espouse the idea that education should be used as a tool to impart socialist ideals, as well as to prepare students for industrial and factory work.

By 1914, his works were already being published and having significant influence. His first works to be published that year were The Place of K. D. Ushinsky in the History of Russian Pedagogy and Pedagogy of Progress and Humanity.

Following the October Revolution, he was made a professor at Moscow University, and was heavily involved with-and became the first leader of- the Academy of Socialist Education. Under his direction, a great deal of scientific research was conducted across various scientific institutes.

Between 1918 and 1930, Blonsky wrote over a hundred works supporting the newfound socialist educational system, and towards advancing his model of education. Blonsky was one of the main theorists of Soviet paedology, and introduced the behaviorist approach in Russian psychology under the label of "objective Marxist psychology".

He worked at the Institute of Psychology for the last ten years of his life in an advisory role.

In 1936, after the publication of "On Paedological Distortions in the System of People's Commissariat of Education", he was severely criticized for his adherence to psychological testing, and for studying innate capabilities between individuals, which contradicted official Soviet ideology. His work and its influence was subsequently disavowed.

He died in 1941 of tuberculosis and was buried at the Novodevichy Cemetery.

== Published works ==
- Задачи и методы народной школы (1916)
- Философия Плотина (1918)
- Проблема реальности у Беркли. Киев, 1907.
  - Блонский П. П. Проблема реальности у Беркли. М.: Книжный дом «ЛИБРОКОМ», 2009. — 160 с. (Из наследия мировой философской мысли: история философии.)
- Современная философия, т. 1-2 (1918—1922)
- Трудовая школа (1919)
- Реформа науки (1920)
- Очерк научной психологии (1921)
- Психологические очерки (1927)
- Очерки детской сексуальности (1928)
- Педология (1934)
- Память и мышление (1935, переиздана в 2001)
- К проблеме воспоминания. М., Директмедиа Паблишинг, 2008.
- Развитие мышления школьника (1935)
- Избранные педагогические произведения, — М., 1961;
- Избранные психологические произведения. — М., 1964;
- Избранные педагогические и психологические сочинения. Т. 1–2. — М., 1979.
- Психологический анализ припоминания М., Директмедиа Паблишинг, 2008.
