= Taisia Kornilova =

- Born: Taisia Anatolievna Kornilova; 19 May 1961 (age 64); USSR
- Occupations: Actress, Animal training
- Years active: 1967-present
- Website: http://www.kornilovs-show.ru

Taisia Anatolievna Kornilova (Russian: Таисия Анатольевна Корнилова; born 19 May 1961 in the Soviet Union) is a People's Artist of Russia, circus performer, elephant trainer, screenwriter, director, artistic director of variety-circus programs. She holds several certified Guinness World Records for her achievements in elephant training.

== Biography and career ==
Taisiya Anatolyevna Kornilova was born on May 19, 1961. Her parents are circus performers, trainers Anatoly Alexandrovich Kornilov and Nina Andreyevna Kornilova. Taisia, the representative of the dynasty in the third generation, began to perform in the circus from the age of 6 with the number "Girl Taya and elephant Maya". When the family of trainers was on tour in Riga, Taisia was first seen by her future husband Alexei Dementyev, who at that time was 6 years old. After many years in the same place in Riga, where Kornilov's program once again came on tour, Taisia and Alexey were students of the same school.

The creative tandem of two young talented people turned out to be ideal: Alexei, in addition to animal training, was engaged in all administrative issues, Taisia, after graduating from the directing department of GITIS, took over the creative side of the program. The artists not only improved the attraction, showing in it a completely new presentation of animal training which met the requirements and style of the time, but also created their own tent-circus, with which they successfully toured in many cities and countries. Their elephants appeared in many famous movies, and the couple themselves in 2000 became the youngest People's Artists of Russia and received the state award of Moscow.

In 2000, the Kornilov family experienced a tragedy - Aleksei Dementiev died in a car accident. The circus show artists went on tour to Belgium, and Alexei fell asleep at the wheel, drove to the oncoming lane and died from a head-on collision. Goodbyes were bid to him twice - on the arena of the Moscow Circus on Tsvetnoy Boulevard where the same kind of farewell was held only with Yuri Nikulin, and in native Riga. Currently Taisia Kornilova is helped by her son Andrei in her creative projects, who became his father's successor. The most famous circus shows of Taisiya Kornilova are "Carnival of elephants", "On elephants around the world", "The mystery of elephants-giants", "New Year's stir", "Journey into the jungle". Almost all the premieres of the variety show Taisiya Kornilova are on the arena of the Nikulin Circus.

== Awards ==
- People's Artist of Russia (2000)
- Laureate of the State Prize of Moscow (2000)
- Prizewinner of the international festival in Verona
