= Alexei Stanislavovich Avtonomov =

Russian legal scholar

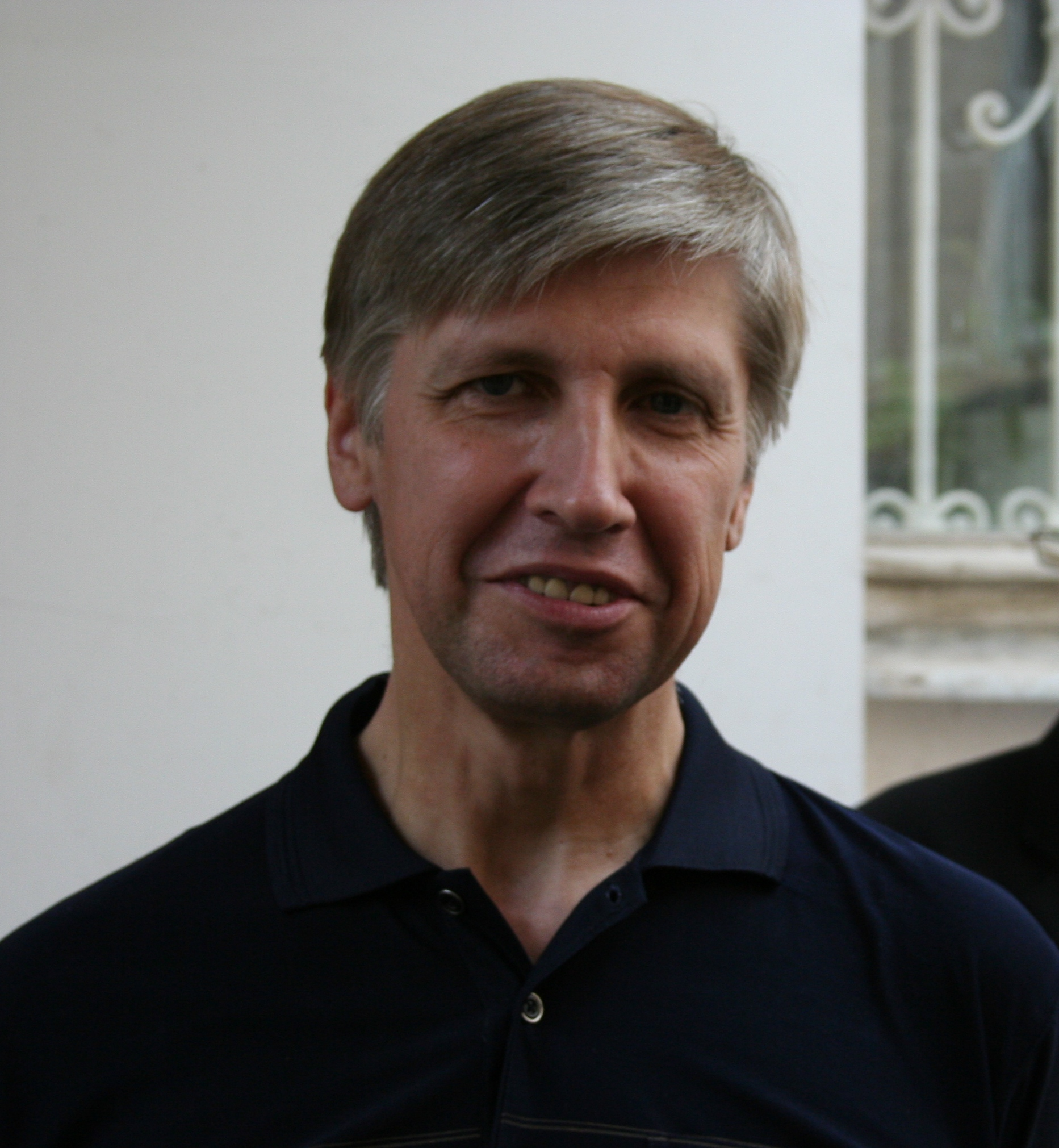

Alexei Stanislavovich Avtonomov (born 9 March 1959 in Moscow) is a Russian legal scholar, member of UN Committee on the Elimination of Racial Discrimination since 2003. He graduated from MGIMO in 1981 and was awarded Candidate of Sciences (equivalent of PhD) degree in 1984. In 1999, he was awarded Doktor nauk degree. Since 2001, Avtonomov is a professor of the State University of Humanitarian Sciences. Since 2004, he is senior research fellow of the Institute of State and Law. Avtonomov is also a professor of the Higher School of Economics.

== Sources ==
- Biography at OHCHR portal
- Personal data at National Research University Higher School of Economics website(in Russian)
- Personal data at Institute of State and Law website(in Russian)
