= First Working Group of Constructivists =

Group of artists

The First Working Group of Constructivists was formed in March 1921 in Moscow by a group of seven artists. They were soon joined by four other people, to form one of the pioneering groups of Constructivism. They soon become part of the Institute of Artistic Culture (INKhUK), a state-funded body established by the Fine Arts department of the People's Commissariat for Education, Izo-Narkompros.

== Composition ==
The group was composed of:

- Karlis Johansons, (1892–1929)
- Alexander Rodchenko, (1891–1956)
- Varvara Stepanova, (1894–1958)
- Konstantin Medunetsky, (1899–1935)
- Georgii Stenberg, (1900–1933)
- Vladimir Stenberg, (1899–1982)
- Aleksei Gan, (1893–1942)

They were soon joined by:

- Nikolai Tarabukin, (1889–1956)
- Boris Arvatov, (1896–1940)
- Osip Brik, (1888–1945)
- Boris Kušner, (1888–1937)
