= Kino-Fot =

Soviet Russian-language film magazine (1922-1923)

Kino-Fot (Russian: Кино-фот) was a Russian magazine dedicated to cinema produced from 1922 to 1923 under the editorship of Aleksei Gan. A total of six issues of the magazine were produced, five in 1922 with a sixth in 1923. The contributors included Vladimir Mayakovsky, Dziga Vertov and Lev Kuleshov. It was, for a while, the principal journal of the emerging cinematic industry in the Soviet Union.

The magazine is credited for being an avant-garde influence for the creative flow the 1920s, bringing new abstract photomontage and typographic designs.

== Issue 1, 25–31 August 1922 ==
The first issue contained Vertov's statement "We: Variant of a Manifesto" which commenced with a distinction between "kinoks" and other approaches to the emergent cinematic industry:

"We call ourselves kinoks – as opposed to "cinematographers", a herd of junkmen doing rather well peddling their rags.
We see no connection between true kinochestvo and the cunning and calculation of the profiteers.
We consider the psychological Russo-German film-drama – weighed down with apparitions and childhood memories – an absurdity."

Hyppolite Sokolov wrote those introductory lines : "Cinema - a new philosophy. Cinema's language, analytical or synthetic, is the new esperanto of the futur. Cinema - a new science. It will replace newspapers, will help scientists and teachers. The straight line is everywhere : town, American architecture, etc. It is opposed to the curved line (nature). Our era is the one of geometric and mechanic beauty [...] Alone on the screen stands the automated man, of the new industry, the man who walks in a taylorized fashion. We need H.G. Wells".

== Issue 3, 19–25 September 1922 ==
This issue included drawings by Varvara Stepanova, a drawing by Alexander Rodchenko of a proposed building for the All-Russian Congress of Soviets and an article by him about Charlie Chaplin.

== Issue 6, 8 January 1923 ==
This issue included an article by Vertov, "Kino-Pravda" which related to a series of documentaries Kino-Pravda the first of which had been released in June 1922.

== See also ==
- List of avant-garde magazines
