= Varvara Bubnova =

Russian painter

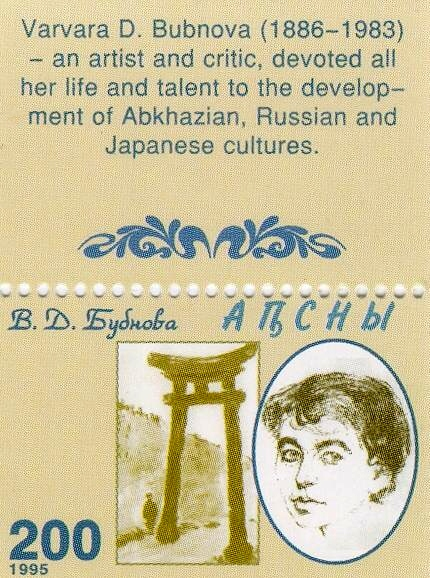
- Varvara Bubnova and her painting on a 1995 Abkhazia stamp
- Born: May 17, 1886; RussiaSt. Petersburg
- Died: March 28, 1983 (aged 96); Leningrad
- Resting place: graphic artist
- Other name: Анна Бубнова Дмитриевна
- Relatives: Anna Bubnova-Ono (violinist, violin teacher)

Varvara Bubnova (17 May 1886 – 28 March 1983) was a painter, graphic artist (master of lithography) and pedagogue.

== Biography ==
She was born in St. Petersburg into the family of Dmitry Kapitonovich Bubnov (?–1914), a bank clerk of lower rank.

Her mother Anna Nikolaevna (maiden name Wolfe) (1854–1940) descended from an old noble Russian family and was distantly related to Alexander Pushkin.

From 1903 to 1905, Bubnova studied in the studio of Art Promotion Society. From 1907 until 1914 she studied in the St. Petersburg Academy of Arts. She attended school with the soon-to-be famous Pavel Filonov and her future husband Voldemārs Matvejs, who was the first Russian researcher of African Art. In 1919, she published the book Искусство негров (Iskusstvo negrov) under the pseudonym of her partner Matvejs, a study on African art in Europe. For this purpose, the couple traveled through Europe from 1912 to 1913, visiting ethnological museums in Paris, Berlin, Hamburg, Cologne, London, Leningrad, Copenhagen, Christiana, Leiden, Amsterdam, and Brussels. During their travels, they took 120 photographs of individual museum exhibits and published them.

In 1910 she became a member of the Youth Union and participated in art exhibitions with Mayakovsky, Burlyuk, Larionov, Goncharova, and Malevich.

From 1917 until 1922. Bubnova lived in Moscow and worked for the Institute of Artistic Culture with among others Wassily Kandinsky, Robert Falk, Lyubov Popova, Varvara Stepanova and Alexander Rodchenko. In November 1920 she formed the Working Group of Objective Analysis with the last three. This was set up in opposition to what they regarded as Kandinsky's individualistic psychologism. In 1923, she moved to Japan where she lived until 1958. During her time there, Bubnova was mainly painting water-colours and lithographs. She had a significantly large impact on Japanese Arts and was awarded the Japanese Order of the Precious Crown by the Japanese Emperor.
