= Drevin =

Drevin is a surname. Notable people with the surname include:

- Aleksandr Drevin (1889–1938), Latvian-Russian painter
- Andrey Drevin (1921–1996), Russian sculptor, son of Aleksandr
- Dmitri Drevin (born 1982), Russian gymnast

== See also ==
- Drevin, French village in the commune of Saint-Pierre-de-Varennes
