= Institute of Artistic Culture =

Artistic organisation in Moscow, Russia

The Institute of Artistic Culture (Russian: Институт Художественной Культуры abbreviated to ИНХУК/INKhUK) was a theoretical and research based Russian artistic organisation founded in March Moscow in 1920 and continuing until 1924.

== Origins ==
It was established under the authority of the Narkompros and funded through the Department of Fine Arts (IZO). In May 1920 Anatoly Lunacharsky appointed Wassily Kandinsky as its first director. David Shterenberg, who was at that time the director of IZO, stated "We organised the INKhUK as a cell for the determination of scientific hypotheses on matters of art". In its first year it attracted about 30 visual artists, Architects, musicians and art critics. Many of them were also taught at Vkhutemas and published in LEF. One of the consequences of state funding was the maintenance of stenographic records, originally kept by Varvara Stepanova and after 1921 by Nikolai Tarabukin. These were published in 1979 by Selim Khan-Magomedov.

== Kandinsky's Inaugural Programme ==
Kandinsky's presented the Inaugural Programme in June 1920 to conference with delegates from the Svomas (State Free Art Studios). Central to his presentation was the idea of a "science of art" whereby would research into the "fundamental elements" of art in general, as well as more specific "supplementary elements" which are less generalised, even within a specific medium. The organisation was to be composed of three sections:

- research of the fundamental elements of painting, sculpture, architecture, music, dancing and poetry
- research into the intrinsic, organic and synthetic ways in which the different arts are linked
- research into monumental art, which Kandinsky predicted would become the art of the future.

However nothing much came from the first two sections, and only the third section achieved anything. Supported by both Stepanova and Alexander Rodchenko, this section had 33 meetings between May and December 1920. In fact this section ended up dealing with a broad variety of issues from folk songs, children's art, faktura, lubki, African sculpture and dance as well as the sort of study of the fundamental elements originally allocated to the first section. Although Kandinsky adopted what superficially appeared to be scientific methods to determine the nature of these elements, for example by circulating surveys, the way these surveys were drawn seemed to indicate his approach was more predetermined by his aesthetic theories - such as the centrality of the artists "inner necessity" - than a more objective approach. Thus his colleagues started organising a way to resist the subjectivism of what was referred to as "Kandinsky's psychologism".

=== The Working Group of Objective Analysis ===
Criticism of Kandinsky was initiated by Nikolay Punin, who complained his art was accidental and individualistic. This encouraged Stepanova, Rodchenko, Liubov Popova and Varvara Bubnova to form the Working Group of Objective Analysis in November 1920.
