= Maria Gough =

Art historian

- Title: Joseph Pulitzer, Jr. Professor of Modern Art

Academic background
- Education: University of Melbourne; Johns Hopkins University; Harvard University

Academic work
- Discipline: Modern Art
- Sub-discipline: Russian avant-garde, French modernism
- Institutions: University of Michigan; Stanford University; Harvard University

Maria Elizabeth Gough is an English art historian and actor. She serves as Joseph Pulitzer, Jr. Professor of Modern Art at Harvard University. Her research focuses on early twentieth-century European art, particularly the Russian avant-gardes, Weimar, and French modernism.

== Life ==
Gough graduated from the University of Melbourne (BA Hons, 1987), Johns Hopkins University (MA, 1991), and Harvard University (PhD, 1997). Prior to joining the Harvard faculty, she taught at University of Michigan (1996–2003) and Stanford University (2003–2009).

In 1991, Gough was part of an Oxford University Press video series designed to teach English to children, playing the title character Wizadora. (The role was recast when ITV picked up the series.)

== Works ==
- Gough, Maria Elizabeth (2005). The Artist as Producer: Russian Constructivism in Revolution. University of California Press. ISBN 978-0-520-22618-0.
- Gough, Maria Elizabeth (2005). The Artist as Producer: Russian Constructivism in Revolution. University of California Press. pp. 385–387. ISBN 0-520-22618-6. ISSN 1080-6601.
- Gough, Maria Elizabeth (1997). The Artist as Producer: Karl Ioganson, Nikolai Tarabukin and Russian Constructivism, 1918–1926 (PhD thesis). Harvard University. p. 553. OCLC 41330930.
  - K. Andrea Rusnock (March 22, 2007). "The Artist as Producer: Russian Constructivism in Revolution". Canadian Journal of History (Review) – via The Free Library.
- Gough, Maria Elizabeth (2013). "Publicity—New in Print." In Léger—Modern Art and the Metropolis (exh. cat. Philadelphia Museum of Art, 2013) edited by Anna Vallye. Yale University Press, 2013: 99–143. ISBN 9780300197662

== See also ==
- Aleksandr Drevin
- Karlis Johansons
- Konrāds Ubāns
- Tensegrity
