= Karlis Johansons =

Latvian-Soviet avant-garde artist

- Kārlis Johansons
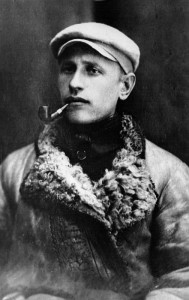
- Johansons, c. 1922
- Born: 16 January 1890; Cēsis, Kreis Wenden, Governorate of Livonia, Russian Empire
- Died: 18 October 1929 (aged 39); Moscow, Russian SFSR, Soviet Union
- Education: Riga Municipal Art School, Latvia; Penza School of Arts, Russia
- Known for: Latvian-Soviet avant-garde Constructivism art, proto-tensegrity, architecture
- Notable work: Self-tensile constructions
- Movement: Constructivism, Bauhaus, Abstract, Surrealism

Karlis Johansson (16 January 1890 – 18 October 1929) was a Latvian-Soviet avant-garde artist.

In 1914 he joined the "Green Flower" (in Latvian: "Zaļā puķe", in Russian: "Зелёный цветок") association of avant-garde artists (besides Johansons, there were also Aleksandrs Drēviņš, Voldemārs Tone (lv) and Konrāds Ubāns. Through the era of the Russian Revolution he lived in Moscow where he was involved in the Russian constructivist movement. In 1921, "self-tensile constructions" were exhibited, which became globally known as "tensegrity" in the 1950s as the topical concept was popularized by Richard Buckminster Fuller and sculptor Kenneth Snelson's work.

== Life ==
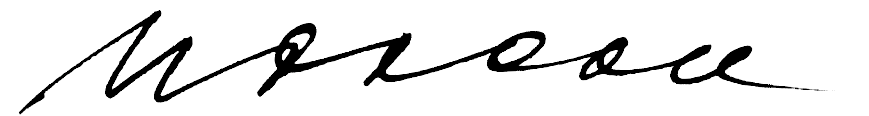
Kārlis Johansons' signature

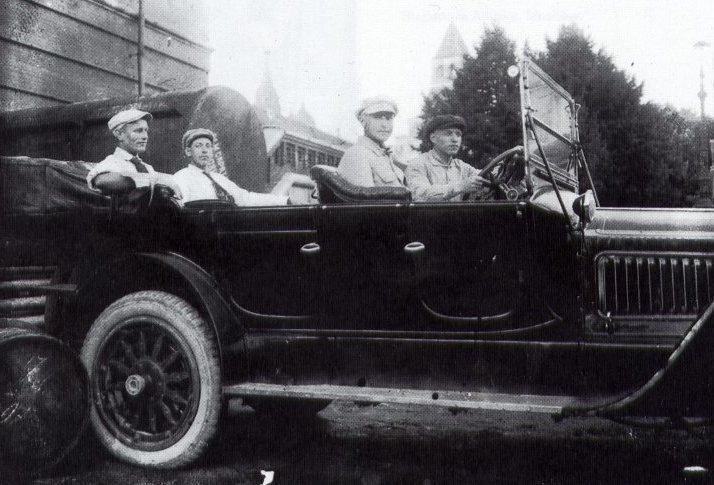
Karl Ioganson, Voldemars Andersons, Karlis Veidemanis, and Gustav Klutsis pose in Lenin's Model T Ford at the Kremlin, Summer 1918. All four artists were members of a detachment of Latvian machine gunners appointed to guard the Kremlin after Lenin's transfer of the Russian capital to Moscow in March 1918. 55.752°N 37.618°E

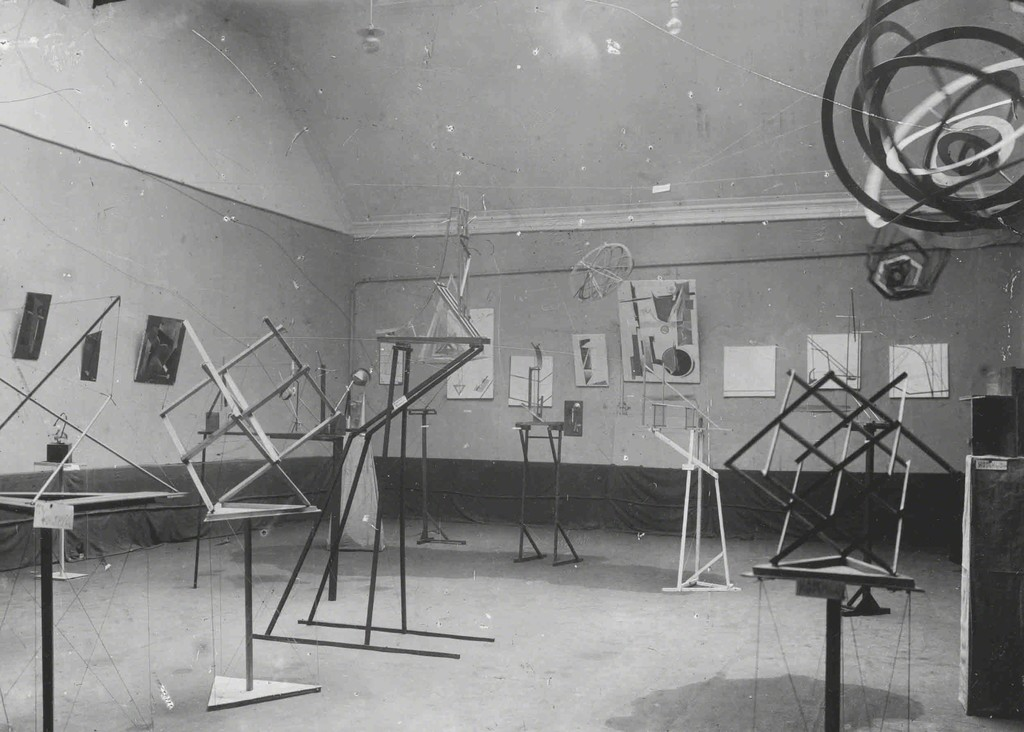
View of Second Spring Exhibition of the OBMOKhU (The Society of Young Artists). Bolshaia Dimitrovska, Moscow, 1921.

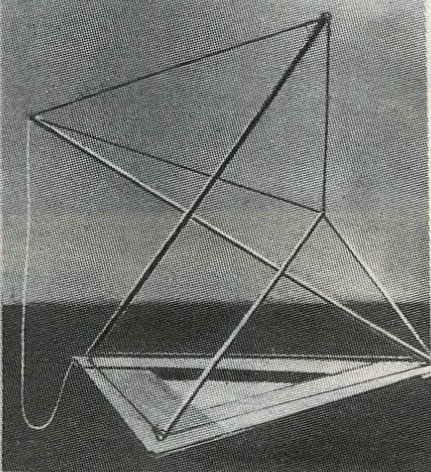
Kārlis Johansons' "Study in Balance" is a c.1920 proto-tensegrity sculpture. David Georges Emmerich (1988) reported that the first proto-tensegrity system, called "Gleichgewichtkonstruktion" ("Equilibrium-structure"), was created by Kārlis Johansons in 1920. It was a structure of three bars and seven cords with an eighth cable without tension that interactively altered the configuration while maintaining equilibrium. This configuration was very similar to his own proto-system invention, the "Elementary Equilibrium", with three struts and nine cables. Regardless, the absence of pre-stress, a key characteristic of tensegrity systems, does not allow this particular Kārlis Johansons "sculpture-structure" to be considered one of the first tensegrity structures.

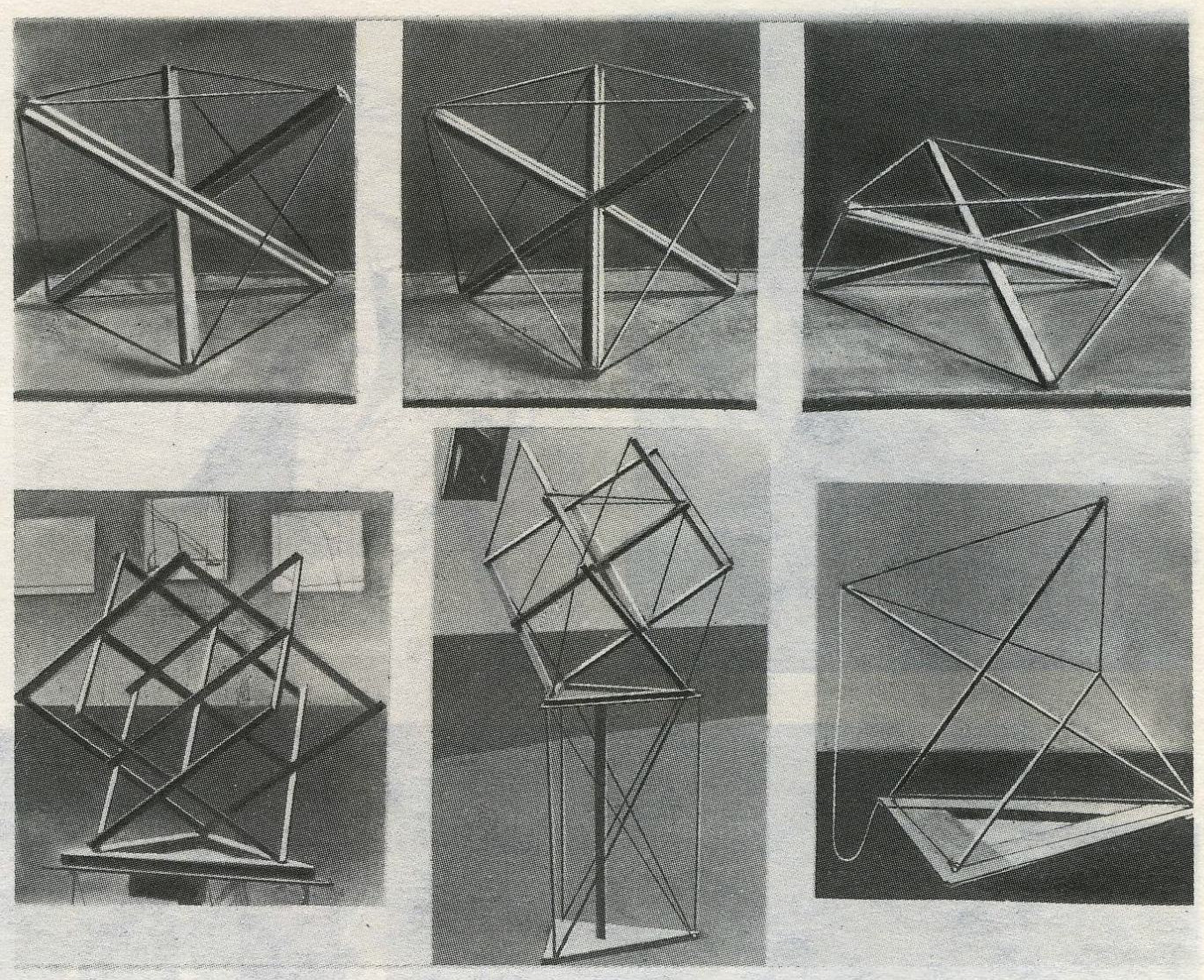
Kārlis Johansons 1921 Spatial Constructions

The Johansons family lived in Meļava, on what is now Piebalga Street in Cēsis, Latvia, their house now long gone. Kārlis' father, Voldemar Johansons, was a carpenter for the famous Cesis Builders Brothers Meganeels; his mother, Kristin, cared for their seven children. Kārlis started pre-school in 1901, then at the Cesis School of the City. He was not a successful pupil and it is unknown if he was artistic at school, however his sisters were crafty as Mary embroidered and Rosalie used pencil and colors. Johansons' playmate Jānis Zariņš said, "There was always talk of art and music in their home." In the autumn of 1910 Kārlis studied at the Riga School of Art. Johansons' choice to pursue an artistic career was unfavorable to his strict father Voldemar. However, in 1911, his father supportively wrote, "Dear son, Kārlis ...I intend to give you those wedge frames to be an artist's easel." Another letter: "...I want you to take a little clay with you from here."

After attending the Municipal Art School in Riga during the 1910s, in 1914 Johansons joined the "Green Flower" (Latvian: Zaļā puķe) artist group. He attended the art school in Penza in 1915-16. During the October Revolution and in 1918 he lived in Moscow and worked in the artist's workshop of the Latvian National Commission under the direction of Aleksandr Drevin, also a "Green Flower" member. In 1919/20 he returned to reside in Penza.

At art school, Johansons developed a life-long friendship with Konrāds Ubāns, Voldemārs Tone, and Aleksandr Drevin, also a Cesmen. When the First World War broke out in 1915 students from Riga Art School went to the Penza School of Arts in Russia. Johansons' parents wrote, "...We think you will have to join the Latvian rifle battalions." In one of his letters Johansons wrote the duties of both art students and soldiers alike were to "draw as much as possible the heroic Latvian positions for the new Latvian book of life." During the war was a strenuous active stage in the sculptor's work as Johansons and Konrad Ubana made a series of gypsum plaster masks from fallen artillery riflemen. After the revolution and collapse of the Riga Front most Latvian riflemen with the Russian army retreated to Russia as did the young artists with the Latvian riflemen. On 26 June 1917, Kārlis wrote to his parents in a letter: "...a very interesting era has begun."

Unlike his friends, Uban and Tone, Johannson did not return to Latvia in 1918, but stayed with Gustav Klutsis, Karl Veidemani, and Voldemar Anderson in Moscow. There he developed a different view of the arts, denying the emotional, fanciful, and ornamental. Johansons participated in a group of artists seeking new tasks for artists in post-revolution Russia. They called themselves Constructivists. In the fall of 1920 he joined the Institute of Artistic Culture (Russian: Институт Художественной Культуры abbreviated to ИНХУК/INKhUK, de), a theoretical and research based artistic organisation in Moscow founded March 1920 until 1924. At the INKhUK (Institute of Artistic Culture) he was a founding member of the "First Working Group of Constructivists". In 1921 the Constructivists expressed their ideas at an ambitious Moscow exhibition under the umbrella of The Society of Young Artists (Russian: Общество Молодых Художников abbreviated to ОБМОХУ/OBMOKhU, ru, de). Johannson's nine three-dimensional structures, "self-stressed constructions", exhibited innovative tension-integrity strain-stress principles of tensegrity. They were functional constructive systems to base new creative types of production and structures on. He exhibited his designs from 22 May through June 1921, at the 2nd exhibition of The Society of Young Artists. In the same year he participated in the INKhUK (Institute of Artistic Culture) debate, "Analysis of Construction and Composition and their Mutual Demarcation".

At the "First Russian Art Exhibition, Berlin, 1922" his works were shown.

In 1923 or 1924 until 1926, Johannson was appointed operating manager of the "Red Exhibition" works (Красный прокатчик). He did not operate there as a technician, rather as an "inventor" of design methods he wanted to develop into practical industrial products. According to Maria Gough, Johannson proved it was possible to overcome the contradiction between art and industrial production.

Johansons commented on his own work,

"From painting to sculpture, from sculpture to construction, from construction to technology and invention - this is my chosen path, and will certainly be the ultimate goal of every revolutionary artist."

Russian artist Viatcheslav Koleichuk claimed the idea of tensegrity was invented first by Johansons. Koleichuk's claim was backed up by Maria Gough for one of the works at the 1921 constructivist exhibition. Kenneth Snelson had acknowledged the Constructivists as an influence for his work and French engineer David Georges Emmerich noted how Kārlis Johansons's work seemed to foresee tensegrity concepts.

He never knew of the profound influence of his ideas. To his Cesis family in letters from Moscow Johannson expressed a strong desire to return to his homeland, but could not as he became seriously ill and died in 1929 from untreated malaria he caught in the Caucasus region. That same year a photo of Johansons's work was published in a Bauhaus book in Germany, one of the 20th century's most influential design schools. Johannson's work became part of teaching curriculums, and later Bauhaus professors shared it with the United States. The Johansons tensile structures were re-coined "tensegrity structures" by Buckminster Fuller, now a field of research employing countless worldwide. The National Aeronautics and Space Administration (NASA) explores various uses of similar structures in space.

== Works ==
His "self-stabilizing constructions" are considered prototypes of the tensegrity construction systems further developed by Richard Buckminster Fuller and Kenneth Snelson in the 1950s.

In photos of the 1921 INKhUK (Institute of Artistic Culture) exhibition, Maria Elizabeth Gough identified a total of nine sculptures made by Johansons, now numbered I-IX. Not a single one of Johansons' sculptures has been preserved, however, there are four prints in the former Costakis collection in the State Museum of Contemporary Art in Thessaloniki.

In 2015, at the Tretyakov Gallery, Moscow, and in Cēsis, eight of Johansons' works were exhibited, reconstructed by well-known Moscow artist-designer Vyacheslav Koleichuk based on measurements accurately interpolated from 1921 photographs due to the loss of the original sculptures.

The fundamental concept in all of Johansons' work relates to one issue: How structural tensile-stress stability occurs when objects are bound with simple contact without fusing, adhesives, or chemical reactions. Johansons called these simple connections "cold" as alternatives to "hot" rivets or welds. "All the cold joints are crosses," Johansons declared, as all of his work investigates intersections of material.

Johansons' work helped revolutionize humanity's structural understanding of things. Tensile-stress is now common and critical to many structures. The new understanding of tensegrity structures was well expressed by Buckminster Fuller as, "islands of compression floating in a great ocean of tension." It's taken some time to better comprehend Johansons' discoveries and even today they've not been fully explored or embraced.

Johansons' unique legacy is exhibited at the Cēsis History and Art Museum retaining oil paintings, watercolors, several prints, illustrated sketchbooks and pages, workshop exercises, sculptural composition sketches, original sculptures, and sculptural masks. Most of these were created at the Riga School of Art, some in Penza, and in 1916 back in Latvia. Prized documents, letters, and rare family photographs were donated by a Cēsis Museum's former employee and art scholar, Erna Berholce, a relative in Kārlis Johansons' mother's family. In his homeland Kārlis Johansons is revered, appreciated in a global art context, and recognized as the most radical Constructivist of 20th century avant-garde art.

== Gallery ==
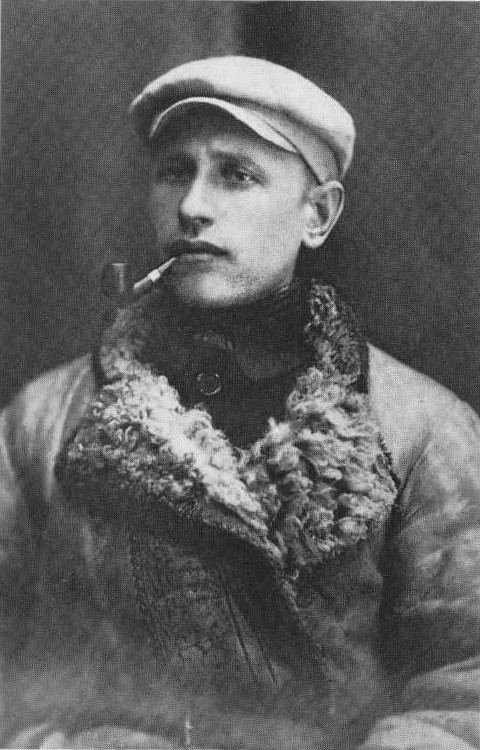
Kārlis Johansons aka Karl Ioganson c. 1922

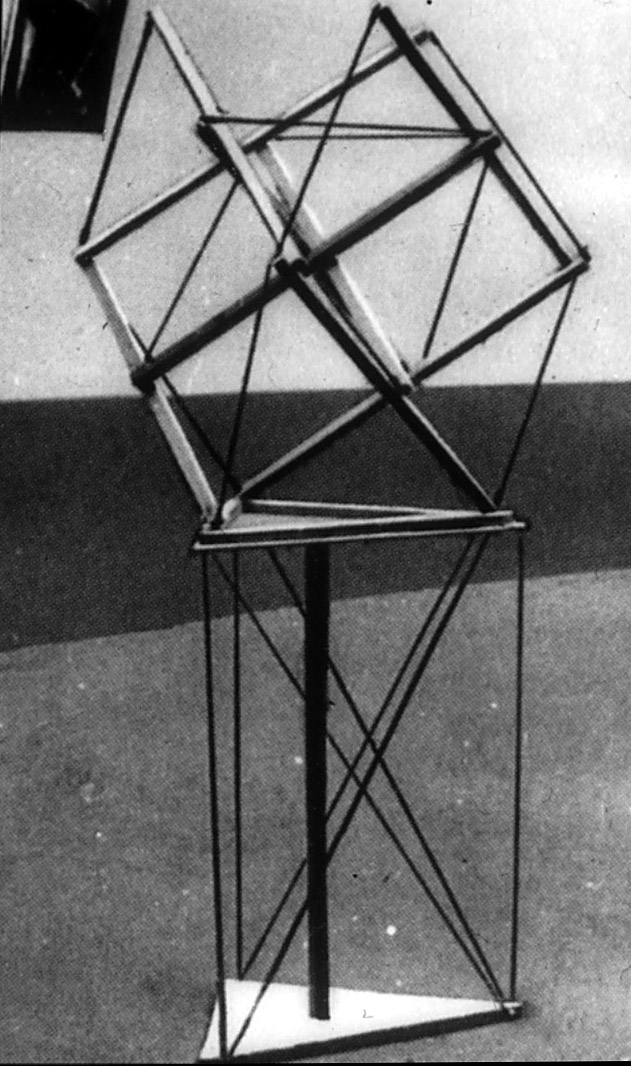
Kārlis Johansons 1920 Construction from his Spatial Cross series

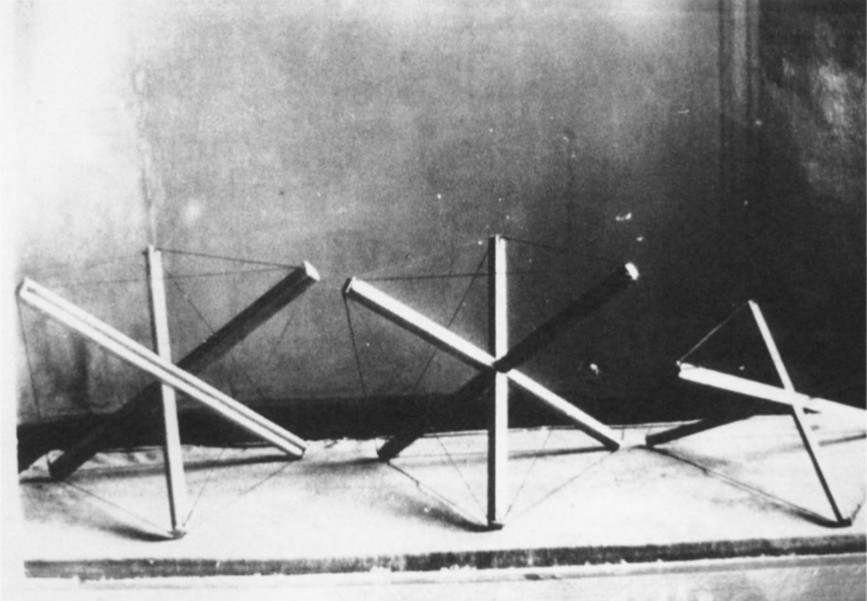
Kārlis Johansons 1921 Spatial Constructions

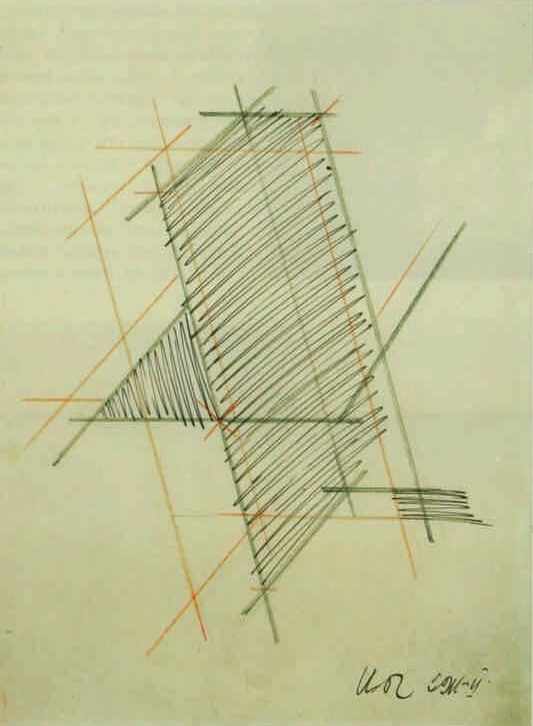
Abstract Composition (Karl Ioganson, 1920–21), Russian Museum, Срб-21

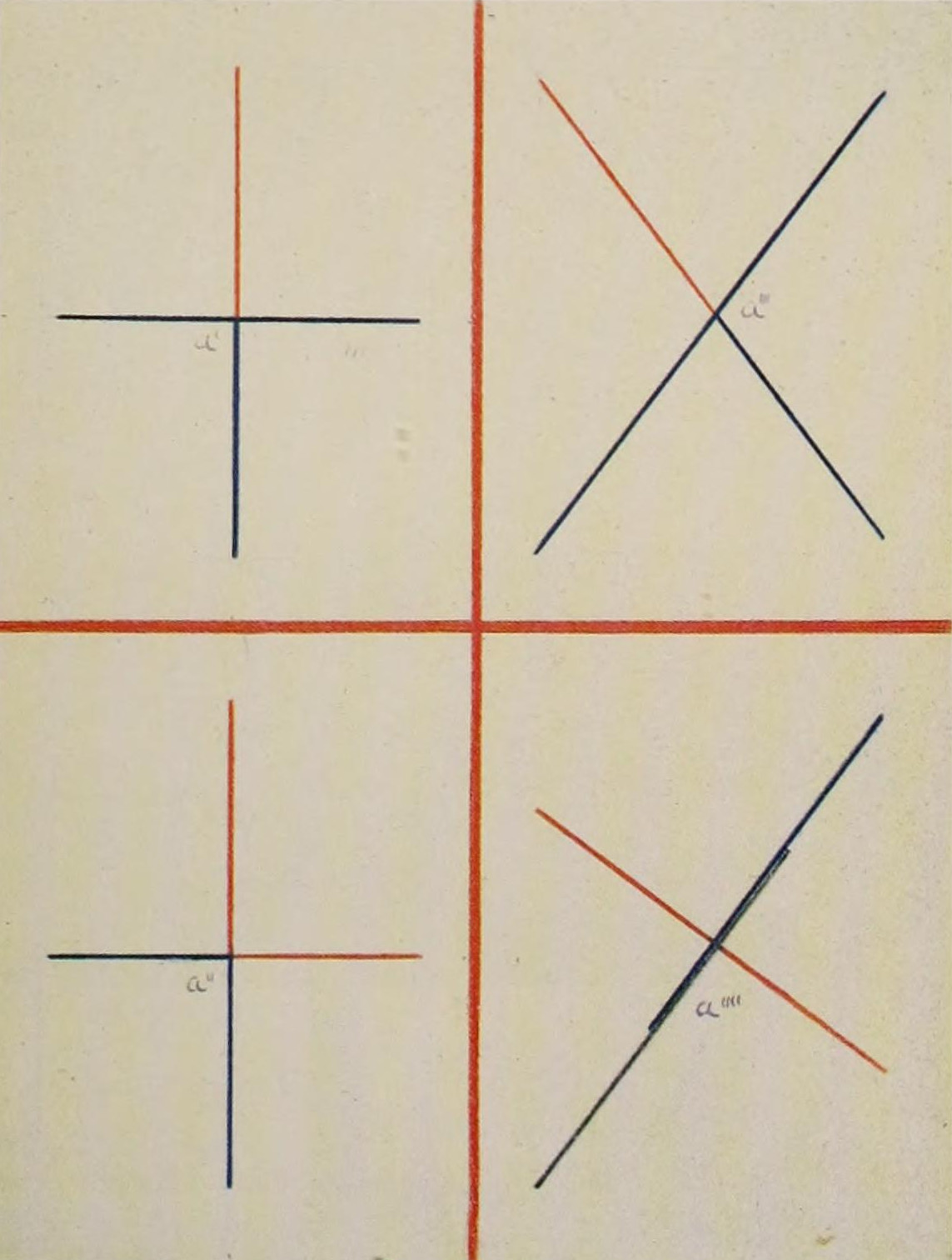
Kārlis Johansons (aka Karl or Karel Ioganson) Composition or Construction, 1921

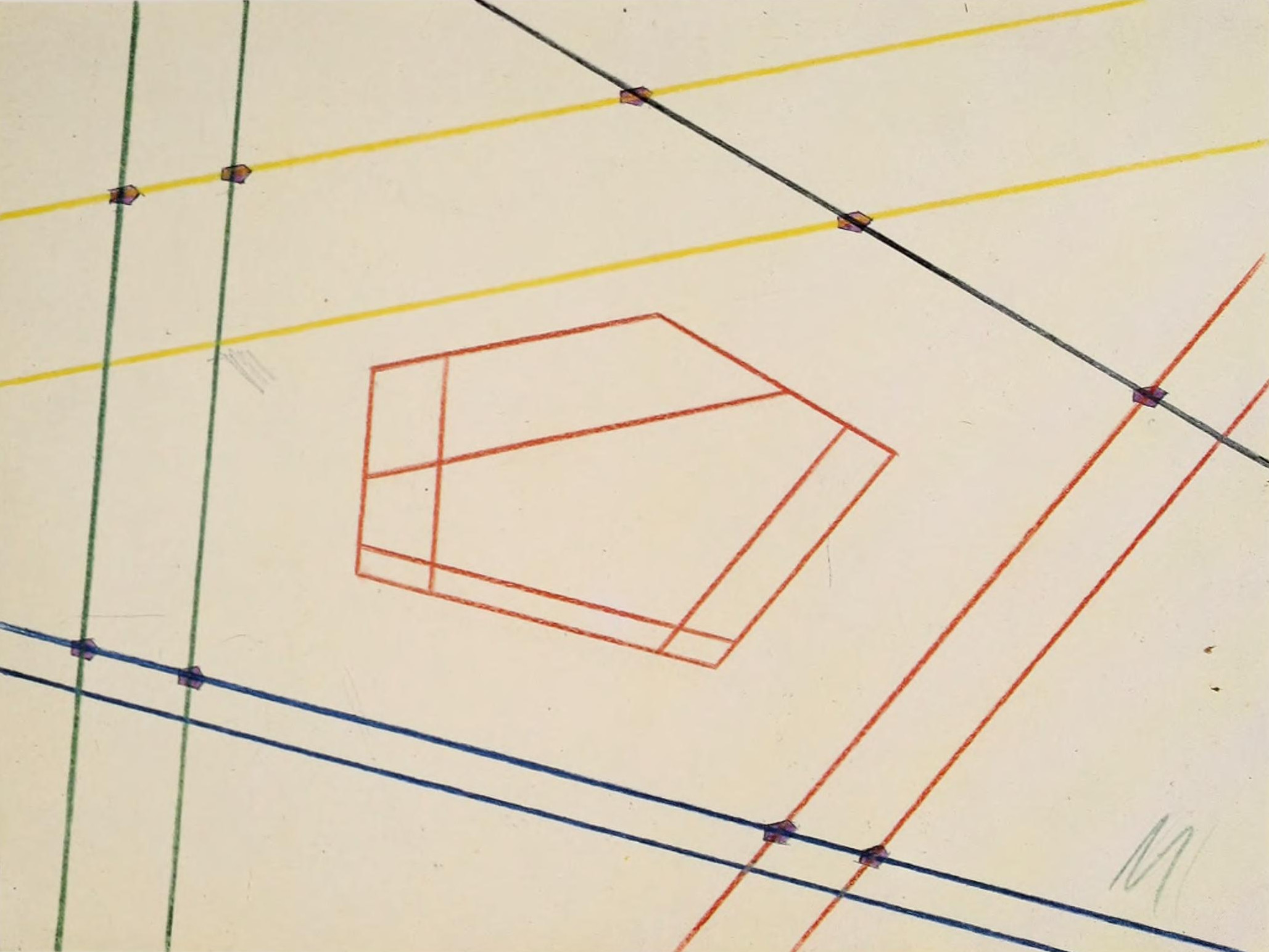
Kārlis Johansons (aka Karl or Karel Ioganson) Construction or Composition, 1921

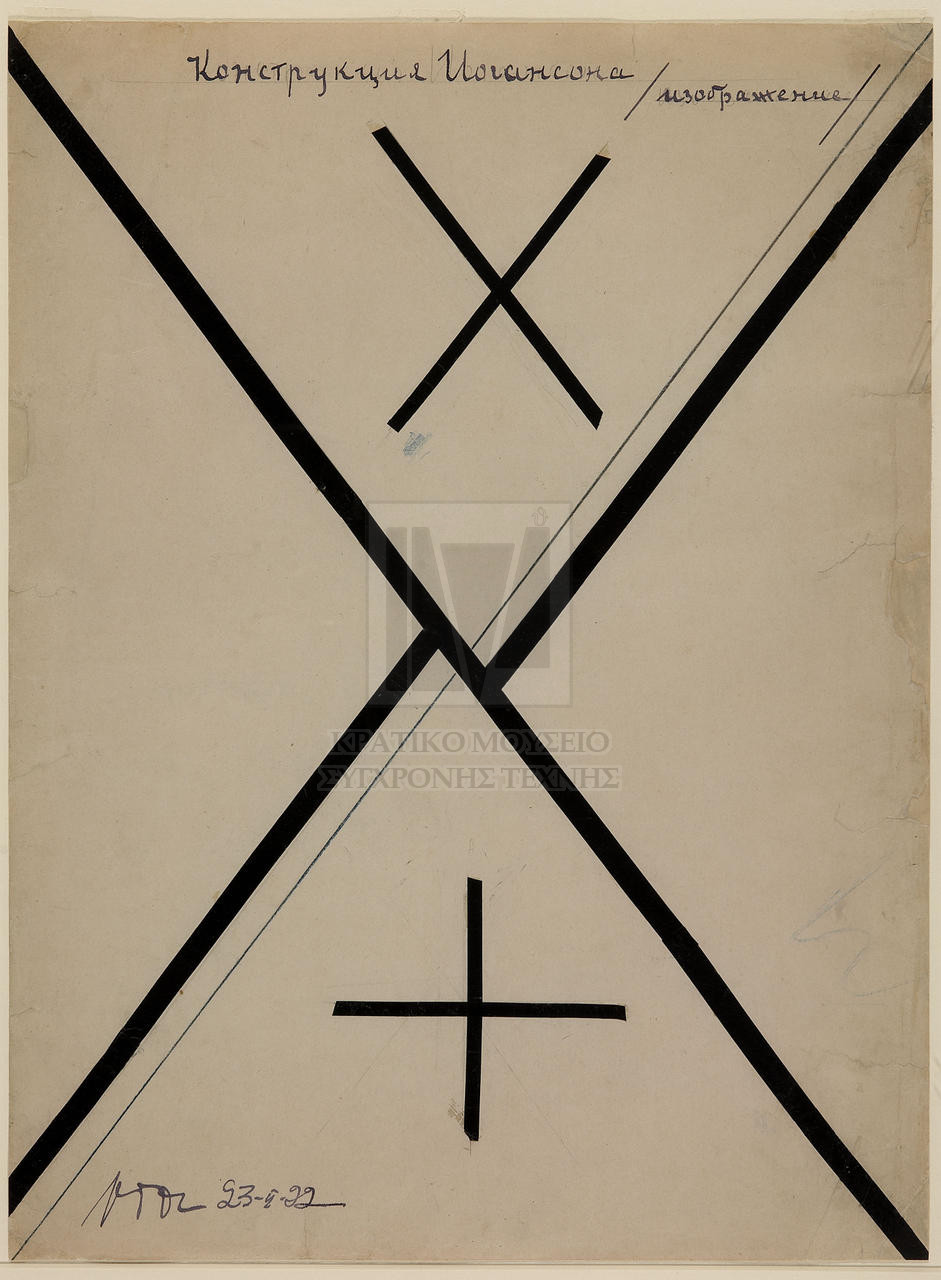
Kārlis Johansons 1922 Construction

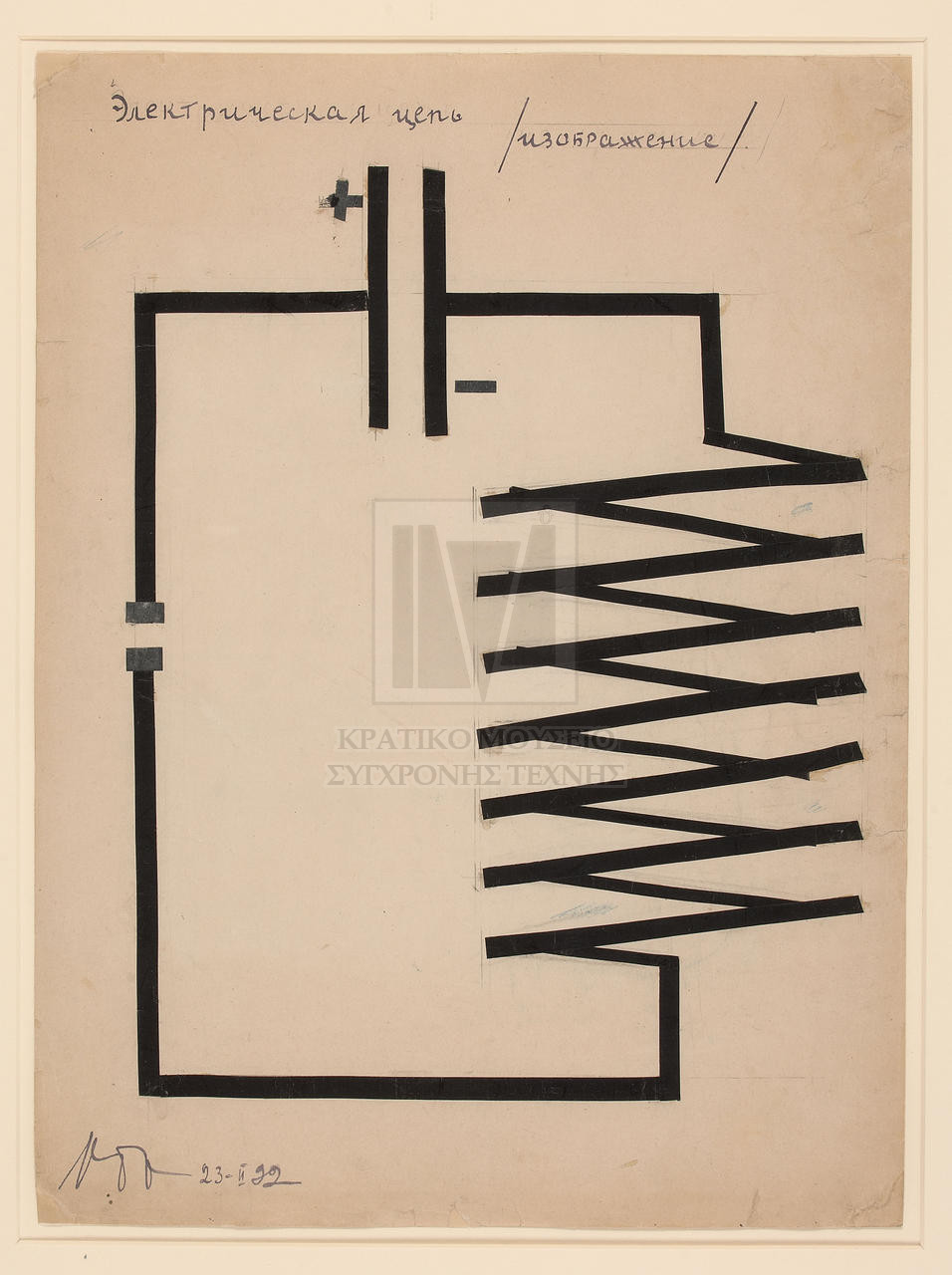
Kārlis Johansons 1922 Electrical Circuit

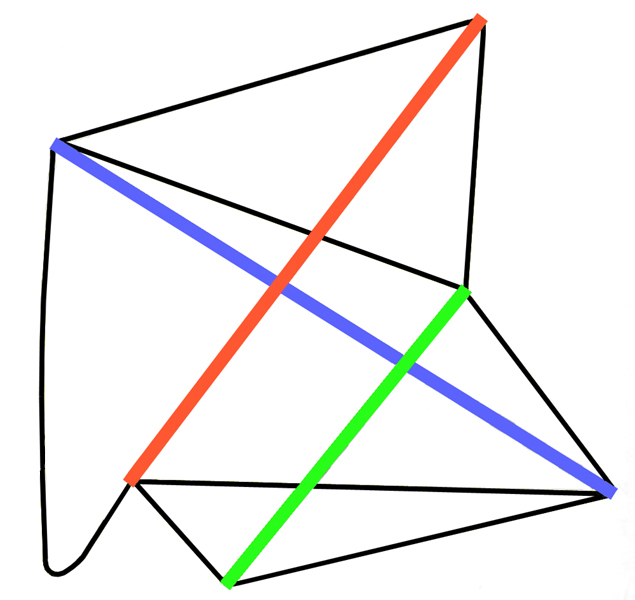
Karl Ioganson's Mechanical Structure. [VIII], 1921 (whereabouts unknown). Graphic illustration of the tensile/tensegrity structure, based on a 1920 photograph.

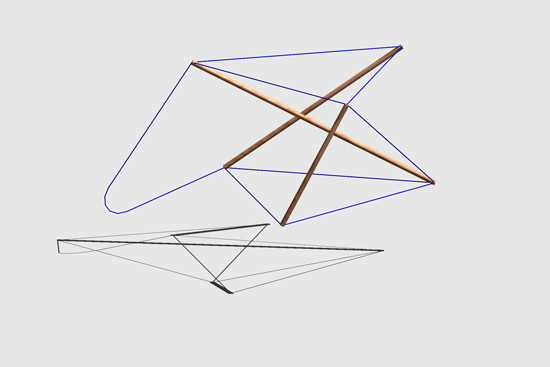
Karl Ioganson's Proto-Tensegrity

== Writings ==
- Karl Ioganson: From Construction to Technology and Invention. p. 70. Henry Art Gallery; Andrews, Richard; Kalinovska, Milena (1990). Art Into Life: Russian Constructivism 1914-1932. Rizzoli, New York. p. 276. ISBN 0847811883.

== See also ==
- Constructivism (art)
  - Aleksandr Drevin
  - Voldemārs Tone
  - Konrāds Ubāns
  - Maria Gough
- Art Academy of Latvia
- Surrealism
- Bauhaus
- David Georges Emmerich
- Tensile structure
- Space frame
