= Nikolay Krymov =

Russian painter

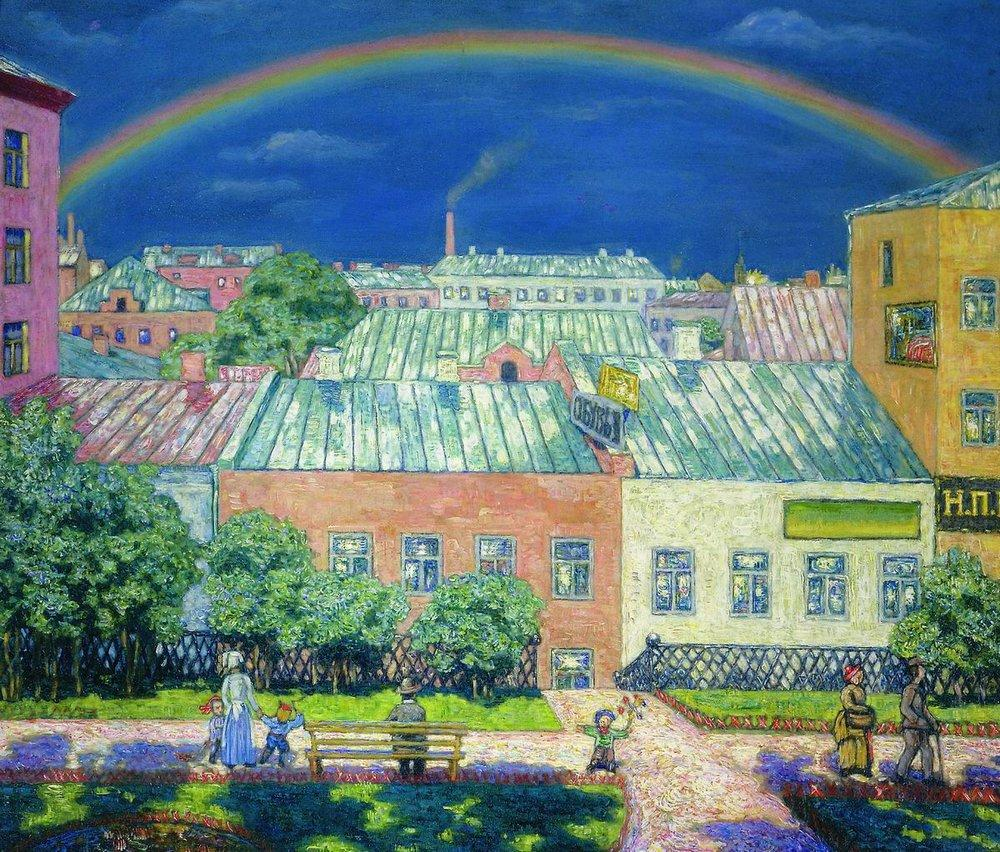
- Moscow landscape. Rainbow (1908)
- Born: Nikolay Petrovich Krymov; 2 May 1884; Moscow, Russian Empire
- Died: 6 May 1958 (aged 74); Moscow, Soviet Union
- Known for: Painting
- Movement: Landscape
- Awards: Order of the Red Banner of Labour

Nikolay Petrovich Krymov (Russian: Никола́й Петро́вич Кры́мов; May 2, 1884— May 6, 1958) was a Russian painter and art theorist, active in Moscow during the Soviet era, primarily known for his landscape pictures.

== Biography ==
Krymov was born into an artistic family. He studied with his father and at the Moscow School of Painting, Sculpture and Architecture at the faculty of Architecture under Abram Arkhipov, Nikolay Kasatkin, Leonid Pasternak, and at studio of Valentin Serov and Konstantin Korovin.

In 1906 Krymov participated in students exhibitions, and from 1907 in exhibitions including the Blue Rose, the Wreath, the Golden Fleece, and the Union of Russian Artists.

He was a member of Union from 1910 to 1923 and of the Society of Moscow Artists from 1923 to 1931. Krymov taught at the Moscow High Artist Technical Workshops from 1920 to 1922 and at the faculty of fine arts of Prechistenka Practical Institute from 1922 to 1924.

He painted chiefly provincial towns and village landscapes, focusing prominently on the countryside. He was noticeably influenced by primitive folklore, though later his style changed to a more classical approach. In the beginning he painted mainly by memory, depicting emotions, and not impressions. From 1920s Krymov began to work plenair. His paintings were more of a study than a depiction. He has also worked for the theatre, designing several famous sets.

In 1949, Krymov was elected as Associate Member of the Soviet Academy of Arts. Krymov was awarded the rank of Honorary Art Worker of Russian Federation in 1942, the Order of the Red Banner of Labour in 1954, and the rank of People's Artist of the RSFSR (visual arts) in 1956.

Krymov died May 6, 1958 in Moscow.
