= 5×5=25 =

1921 exhibition of modern art which took place in Moscow, Russia

Cover art of 5x5=25 catalogue by Alexander Vesnin

5x5=25 was a two-part abstract art exhibition held in September–October 1921 in Moscow. The five artists whose work was shown were Aleksandra Ekster, Lyubov Popova, Alexander Rodchenko, Varvara Stepanova and Alexander Vesnin. They presented highly abstracted, geometric work that rejected expressionist forms of painting common before the World War I and claimed to be the "end" or "death" of art.

Rodchenko presented three canvases of a single colour (red, yellow and blue). He saw that his formal research into Constructivism had reached completion at this point, and claimed that he had demonstrated the "end of painting". The exhibition has been considered an anti-painting manifesto.

Lyubov Popova showed canvases almost bare, puzzling viewers and provoking hail from the critics. Her "flight from painting" influenced Wassily Kandinsky, Mark Rothko and Ad Reinhardt. Popova herself did not regard her works as "the end"; on the contrary, she wrote, "all pieces presented here should be regarded as merely preparations for concrete construction".

Alexander Vesnin presented five abstract cubist canvases that appear pure abstractions but were, in fact, ultimate decomposition of human figures. Vesnin's catalogue cover, in particular, is typical of his book and advertising art of the period: numbers in two "lines" (5x5 and 25) are offset against the baseline, but this irregularity is "disguised" by angled lines dissecting the space.

Catalogues of the exhibition were hand-drawn by the artists and contained original artwork that has never been displayed publicly. At least ten unique albums survive in Russia to date. The 1921 show was reconstructed in 2009 in London's Tate Gallery. Modern critics remain divided over the question of whether "death of painting" was a genuine statement of modern art or it was a dead end with no future.

== Sources ==
- Khan-Magomedov, Selim (2007). Alexander Vesnin (Александр Веснин и конструктивизм) (in Russian). Russky avangard. ISBN 9785964701163.
- Gleason, Abbott; Kenez, Peter; Stites, Richard (1989). Bolshevik Culture: Experiment and Order in the Russian Revolution. Indiana University Press. ISBN 978-0-253-20513-1.
