= Blue Rose (art group) =

Russian artist association

Blue Rose (Голубая роза - Blaue Rose) was a Symbolist artist association in Moscow from 1906 to 1908.

== Characteristics ==
The group emphasized color as a 'tonal' medium to construct rhythm in a painting and the elimination of shape and contour.

== Members ==
Members included Anatolii Arapov, Petr Bromirsky, V. Drittenpreis, Nikolai Feofilaktov, Artur Fonvizin, Nikolai Krymov, Pavel Kuznetsov, Ivan Knabe, Nikolai Milioti, Vasilii Milioti, Aleksandr Matveev, Nikolai Ryabushinsky, Nikolai Sapunov, Martiros Saryan, Serge Sudeikin and Petr Utkin.

== Inspiration ==
Their style was inspired by the Russian Impressionist, Viktor Borisov-Musatov, the name of the group was used for their exhibition in 1906 and was derived from the poem Blue Flower by the poet Novalis.

Vladimir Mayakovsky, the poet/critic said of the group in 1907 "The artists are in love with the music of color and line." Wassily Kandinsky was an associate of the group, being greatly taken with their artistic viewpoint he contributed paintings to a few of their exhibitions in Moscow between 1906 and 1910.

== See also ==
- Der Blaue Reiter, an art group in Munich
- Green Flower, an art group in Latvia
