= Green Flower =

Association of young Latvian avant-garde artists

Green Flower (Latvian: Zaļā puķe) was an association of young Latvian avant-garde artists which lasted from 1914 to 1919.

The group was centred around Jāzeps Grosvalds, who had visited Munich and Paris whilst travelling around Europe since 1909. The group also included Alexander Drevin who, however, left Riga shortly after the group was founded. Other members include Karlis Johansons, Valdemars Tone and Konrāds Ubāns. In 1919 he was dissolved but provided the basis for the Riga group of artists. The name was chosen in reference to the Blue Rose art group in Russia and the Der Blaue Reiter (the Blue Rider) group in Munich, which consisted of both German and Russian artists.
