= Pavel Kuznetsov =

Russian artist

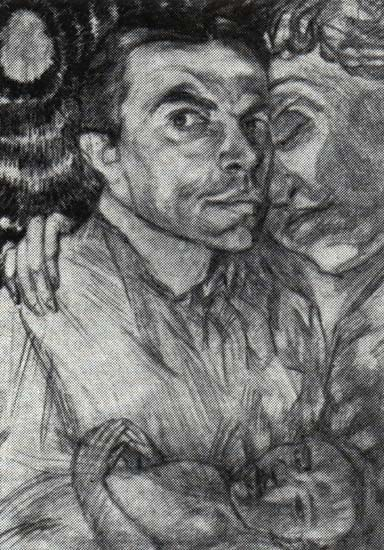
- Pavel kuznetsov, Self-portrait, 1906
- Born: 17 November 1878; Saratov, Russian Empire
- Died: 21 February 1968 (aged 89); Moscow, Soviet Union
- Education: Bogolyubov Art School, Saratov (1891-6); Moscow School of Painting, Sculpture and Architecture (1897–1904); Paris (1905)
- Known for: Painter, graphic artist
- Movement: Orientalist

Pavel Varfolomevich Kuznetsov (1878–1968) was a painter and graphic artist.

== Life and career ==
He studied at Saratov at Bogolyubov Art School (1891–1896), then Moscow School of Painting, Sculpture and Architecture (1897–1904) and for a year in Paris (1905). His early paintings were exhibited by the Mir Iskusstva group, and he was closely associated with the Russian Symbolists. He helped to organize the Crimson Rose exhibition (1904) and was a founder and leader of the Blue Rose in 1907. He taught at the Stroganov Institute (1917–18; 1945-8) and at the Moscow Institute of Fine Arts (1918–37). He headed the painting section of Narkompros until 1921, but fell out of official favour with the advent of Socialist Realism. He was one of the members of the art association ‘The Four Arts’, which existed in Moscow and Leningrad in 1924-1931.

Kuznetsov's early paintings are typical of the Blue Rose group's poetic explorations of an interior, imaginative world through archetypal symbols. After 1910 he drew increasingly on folk culture, continuing to draw on the rich colours and harmonious rhythms of the Symbolists but simplifying his compositions to depict the everyday life of village communities of Kirghizstan in Central Asia.

== Works ==
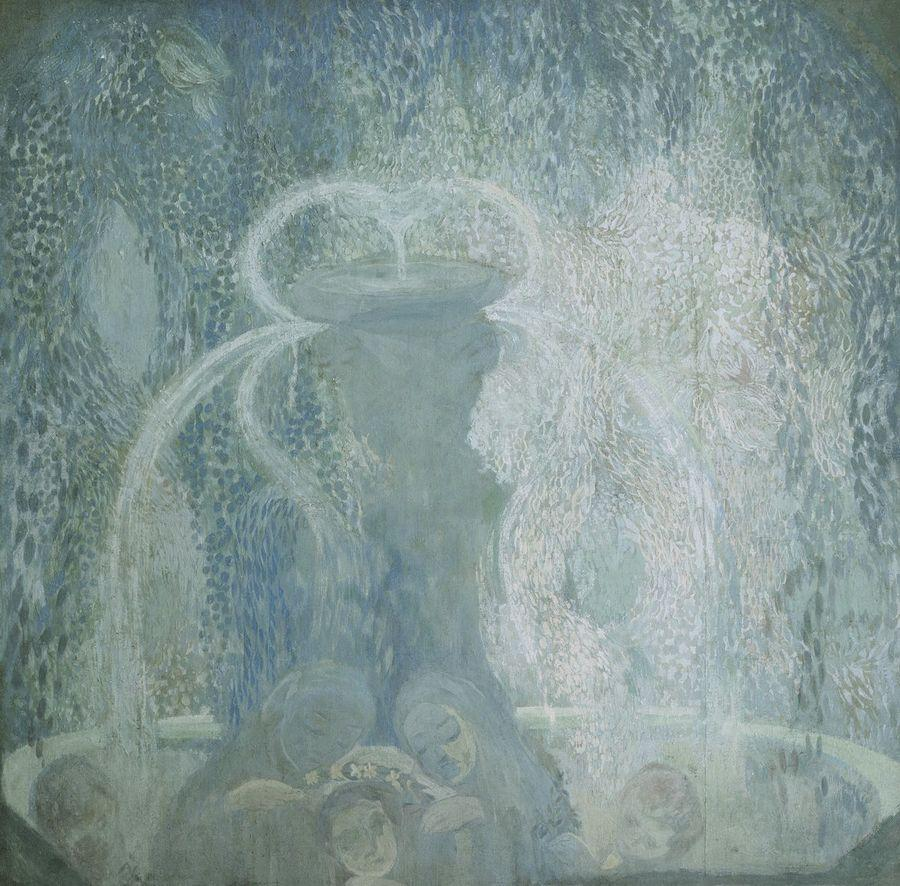
Blue Fountain, 1905

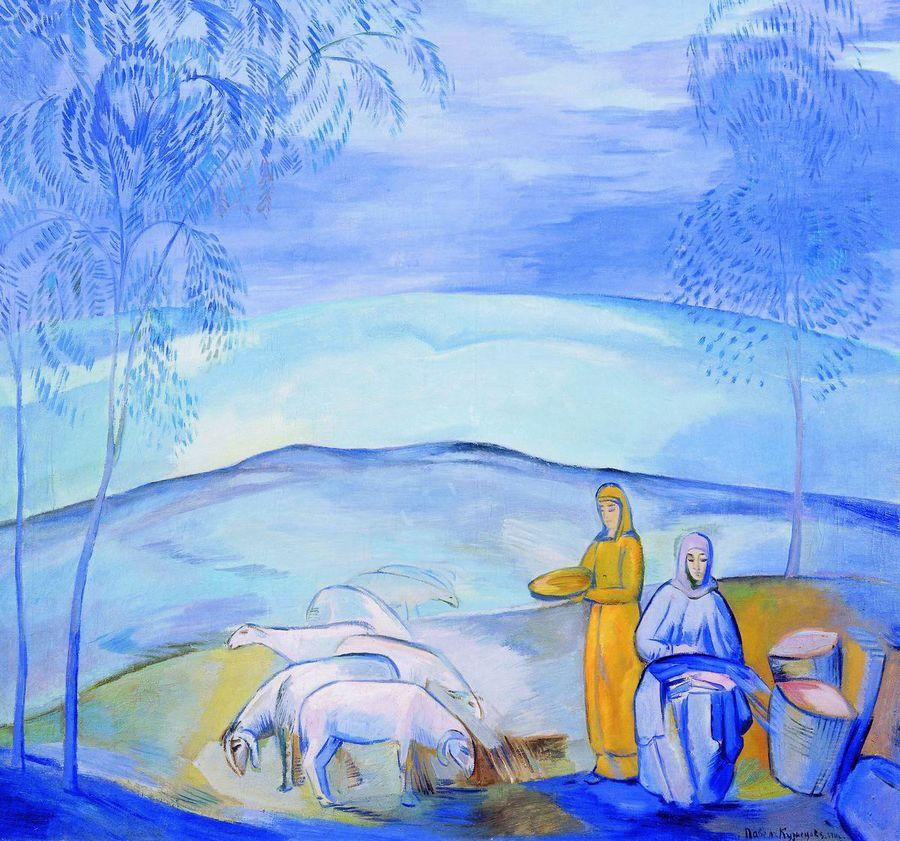
Evening on the Steppe, 1912

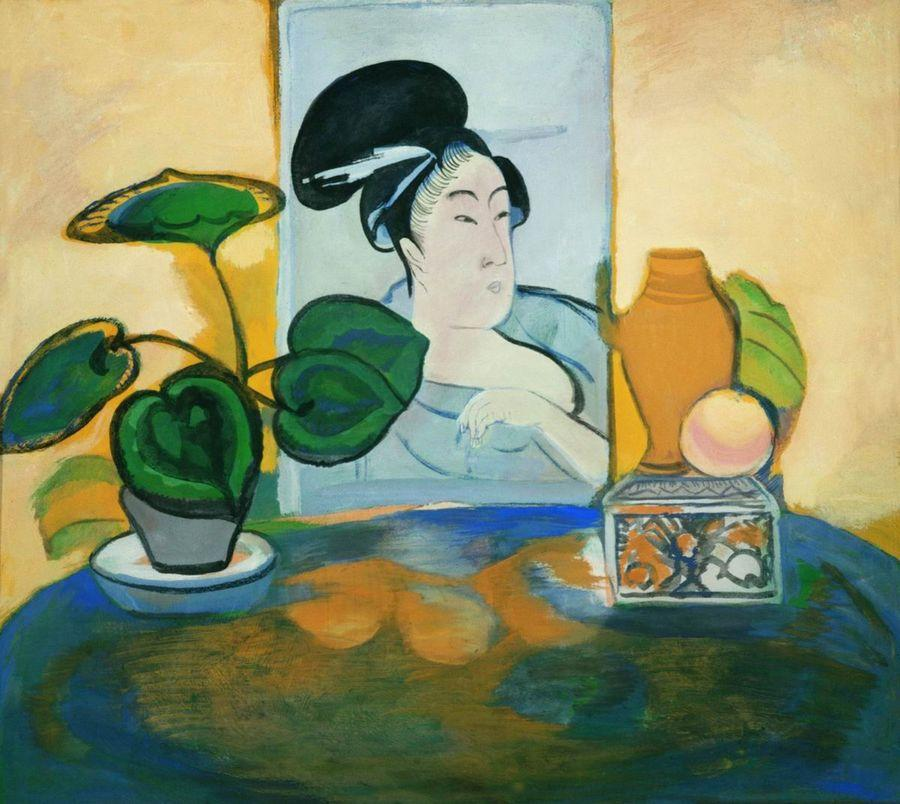
Still life with a Japanese Engraving, 1912

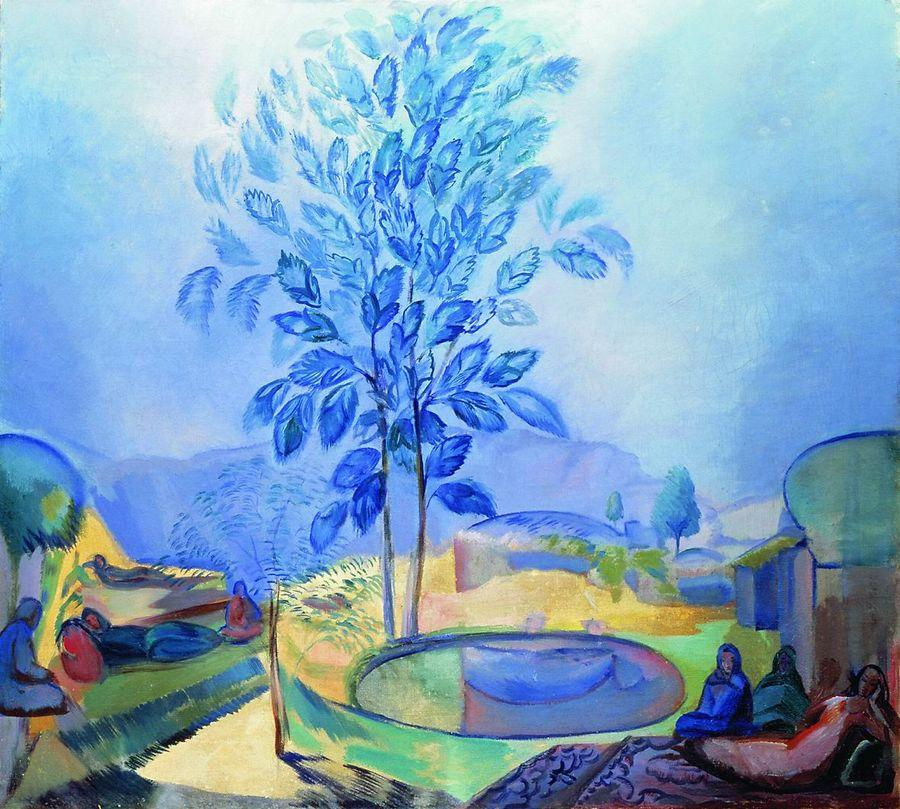
Eastern Motive, 1913-1914

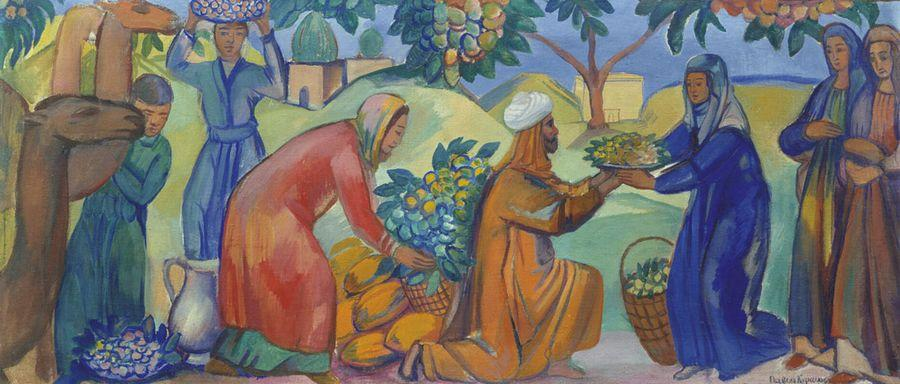
Harvesting of Fruits, 1913-1914
