= Aleksei Gan =

Russian anarchist and artist (died 1942)

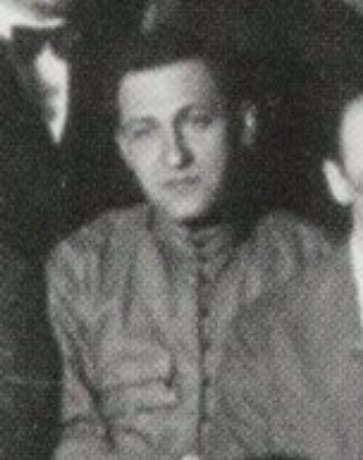
Alexei Gan at the First OSA Conference, 1928

Aleksei Mikhailovich Gan (Russian: Алексей Михайлович Ган; born Imberkh; 1887 or 1893 – 8 September, 1942) was a Russian anarchist and later Marxist avant-garde artist, art theorist and graphic designer. Gan was a key figure in the development of Constructivism after the Russian Revolution.

== Life ==
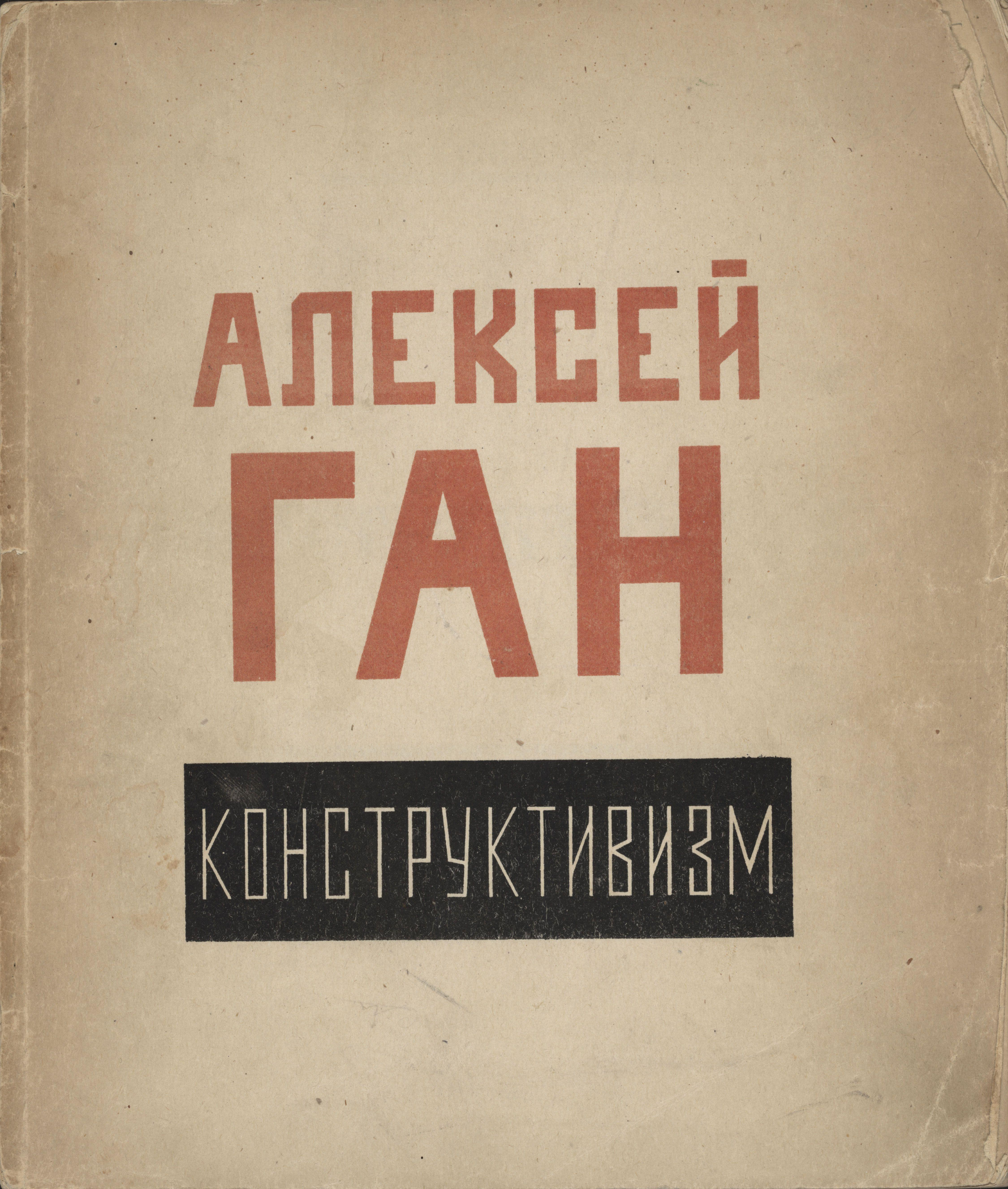
Cover of Constructivism by Gan, 1922

Gan's involvement with creative activity began in 1917 when he became involved with the Moscow Union of Food Workers with whom he set up an amateur theatrical group. The group encompassed various political groupings and following the Bolshevik seizure of power, some joined the Red Army, others the Black Guards or affiliated to the Left Socialist-Revolutionaries. Gan reorganised the group as the Proletarian Theatre, which affiliated to the Moscow Federation of Anarchist Groups.

Gan was the first to write on art in the anarchist newspaper Anarkhiia (Anarchy) when it introduced an art section in early 1918. In March 1921, Gan was one of the seven artists, including Alexander Rodchenko and his wife Varvara Stepanova, who announced themselves as the First Working Group of Constructivists. The group rejected fine art in favour of graphic design, photography, posters, and political propaganda. Gan collaborated with Aleksandr Rodchenko and Varvara Stepanova on a Constructivist manifesto in 1922, and published his own pamphlet Konstruktivism in the same year. He also founded the first Soviet film journal, Kino-Fot (or Kinofot), in 1922.

In 1928 he was one of the founders of the October Group.

He married Esfir Shub, a prominent female soviet documentary filmmaker.

Gan was arrested for "counter-revolutionary" activities in October 1941, found guilty in August 1942, and executed on 8 September 1942.

== Selected works ==
=== Written ===
- Konstruktivizm (Constructivism). Tver: Tver'skoe izdatel' stvo, 1923.

=== Films ===
- The Island of the Young Pioneers, 1924. (Documentary)
- The Seventh October,
- Trades Unions
- Greetings Teamworkers
- In the Battle for Time and Space (unknown whether completed)

== See also ==
- Anarchism in Russia
- Productivism (art)
