= Vkhutemas =

Former design school in Moscow (1920–30)

Coordinates: 55°45′53″N 37°38′08″E

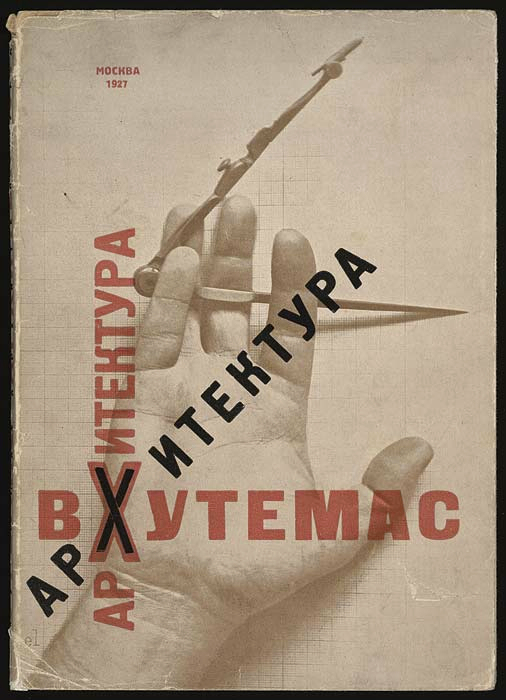
Architecture at Vkhutemas, book cover by El Lissitzky, 1927

Vkhutemas (Russian: Вхутемас, IPA: [fxʊtʲɪˈmas], acronym for Высшие художественно-технические мастерские Vysshiye Khudozhestvenno-Tekhnicheskiye Masterskiye "Higher Art and Technical Studios") was the Russian state art and technical school founded in 1920 in Moscow, replacing the Moscow Svomas.

The workshops were established by a decree from Vladimir Lenin with the intentions, in the words of the Soviet government, "to prepare master artists of the highest qualifications for industry, and builders and managers for professional-technical education". The school had 100 faculty members and an enrollment of 2,500 students. Vkhutemas was formed by a merger of two previous schools: the Moscow School of Painting, Sculpture and Architecture and the Stroganov School of Applied Arts. The workshops had artistic and industrial faculties; the art faculty taught courses in graphics, sculpture and architecture while the industrial faculty taught courses in printing, textiles, ceramics, woodworking, and metalworking.

Vkhutemas was a center for three major movements in avant garde art and architecture: constructivism, rationalism, and suprematism. In the workshops, the faculty and students transformed attitudes to art and reality with the use of precise geometry with an emphasis on space, in one of the great revolutions in the history of art. In 1926, the school was reorganized under a new rector and its name was changed from "Studios" to "Institute" (Вхутеин, Высший художественно-технический институт, Vkhutein, Vysshiy Khudozhestvenno-Tekhnicheskii Institut), or Vkhutein.

The school was dissolved in 1930 following political and internal pressures throughout its ten-year existence. Its faculty, students, and legacy were dispersed into as many as six other schools.

== Basic course ==
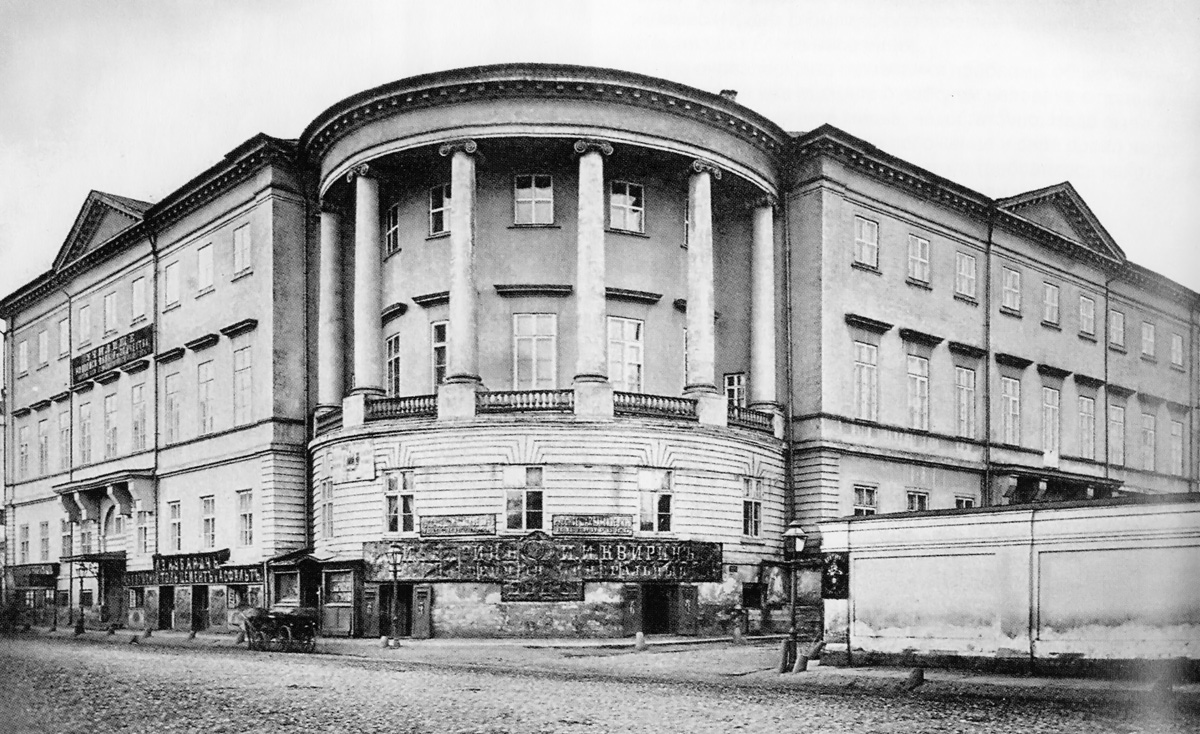
The former Vkhutemas building

A preliminary basic course was an important part of the new teaching method that was developed at Vkhutemas, and was made compulsory for all students, regardless of their future specialization. This was based on a combination of scientific and artistic disciplines. During the basic course, students had to learn the language of plastic forms, and chromatics. Drawing was considered a foundation of the plastic arts, and students investigated relationships between color and form, and the principles of spatial composition. Akin to the Bauhaus's basic course, which all first-year students were required to attend, it gave a more abstract foundation to the technical work in the studios. In the early 1920s this basic course consisted of the following:

1. the maximal influence of color (given by Lyubov Popova),
2. form through color (Alexander Osmerkin),
3. color in space (Aleksandra Ekster)
4. color on the plane (Ivan Kliun),
5. construction (Alexander Rodchenko),
6. simultaneity of form and color (Aleksandr Drevin),
7. volume in space (Nadezhda Udaltsova),
8. history of the Western arts (Amshey Nurenberg) and
9. tutelage (Wladimir Baranoff-Rossine).

== Art faculty ==
The primary movements in art which influenced education at Vkhutemas were constructivism and suprematism, although individuals were versatile enough to fit into many or no movements—often teaching in multiple departments and working in diverse media. The leader figure of suprematist art, Kazimir Malevich, joined the teaching staff of Vkhutemas in 1925, though his group—Unovis, of the Vitebsk art college that included El Lissitzky—exhibited at Vkhutemas as early as 1921. While constructivism was ostensibly developed as an art form in graphics and sculpture, it had architecture and construction as its underlying subject matter. This influence pervaded the school. The artistic education at Vkhutemas tended to be multidisciplinary, which stemmed from its origins as a merger of a fine arts college and a craft school. A further contributor to this was the generality of the basic course, which continued after students had specialised and was complemented by a versatile faculty. Vkhutemas cultivated polymath masters in the Renaissance mold, many with achievements in graphics, sculpture, product design, and architecture. Painters and sculptors often made projects related to architecture; examples include Tatlin's Tower, Malevich's Architektons, and Rodchenko's Spatial Constructions. Artists moved from department to department, such as Rodchenko from painting to metalworking. Gustav Klutsis, who was head of a workshop on colour theory, also moved from painting and sculptural works to exhibition stands and kiosks. El Lissitzky, who had trained as an architect, also worked in a broad cross section of media such as graphics, print and exhibition design.

== Industrial faculty ==
The industrial faculties had the task of preparing artists of a new type, artists capable of working not only in the traditional pictorial and plastic arts but also capable of creating all objects in the human environment such as the articles of daily life, the implements of labor, etc. The industrial department at Vkhutemas endeavored to create products of viability in the economy and functionality found in society. Class-based political requirements steered artists toward crafts, and the designing of household or industrial goods. There was significant pressure in this respect by the Central Committee of the Communist Party, that in 1926, 1927, and 1928, required a student body composition "of worker and peasant origins", and several demands for "working class" elements. This push for design economy resulted in a tendency towards working, functional designs with minimised luxuries. Tables designed by Rodchenko were equipped with mechanical moving parts, and were standardised and multi-functional. The products designed at Vkhutemas never bridged the gap between workshops and factory production, although they cultivated a factory aesthetic—Popova, Stepanova, and Tatlin even designed worker's industrial apparel. Furniture pieces constructed at Vkhutemas explored the possibilities of new industrial materials such as plywood and tubular steel.

There were many successes for the departments, and they were to influence future design thinking. At the 1925 Exposition Internationale des Arts Décoratifs et Industriels Modernes in Paris, the Soviet pavilion by Konstantin Melnikov and its contents attracted both criticism and praise for its economic and working class architecture. One focus of criticism was the "nakedness" of the structure, in comparison to other luxurious pavilions such as that by Émile-Jacques Ruhlmann. Alexander Rodchenko designed a worker's club, and the furniture that the Wood and Metal Working Faculty (Дерметфак) contributed was an international success. The student work won several prizes, and Melnikov's pavilion won the Grand Prix. As a new generation of artist/designers, the students and faculty at Vkhutemas paved the way for designer furniture by architects such as Marcel Breuer, and Alvar Aalto later in the century.

=== Metalwork and woodwork ===
The dean of this department was Alexander Rodchenko, who was appointed in February 1922. Rodchenko's department was more expansive than its name would suggest, concentrating on abstract and concrete examples of product design. In a report to the rector of 1923, Rodchenko listed the following subjects as being offered: higher mathematics, descriptive geometry, theoretical mechanics, physics, the history of art and political literacy. Theoretical tasks included graphic design and "volumetric and spatial discipline"; while practical experience was given in foundry work, minting, engraving and electrotyping. Students were also given internships in factories. Rodchenko's approach effectively combined art and technology, and he was offered the deanship of Vkhutein in 1928, although he refused. El Lissitzky was also a member of the faculty.

=== Textiles ===
The textile department was run by the constructivist designer Varvara Stepanova. In common with other departments, it was run on utilitarian lines, but Stepanova encouraged her students to take an interest in fashion: they were told to carry notebooks so that they could note the contemporary fabrics and aesthetics of everyday life as seen on the high street. Stepanova wrote in her 1925 course plan that this was done "with the goal of devising methods for a conscious awareness of the demands imposed on us by new social conditions". Lyubov Popova was also a member of the textile faculty, and in 1922, when hired to design fabrics for the First State Textile Print Factory, Popova and Stepanova were among the first women designers in the Soviet textile industry. Popova designed textiles both with asymmetrical architectonic geometries, and also work that was thematic. Before her death in 1924, Popova produced fabrics with grids of printed hammers and sickles, which would predate work by others in the political climate of the first five-year plan.

== Lenin's visit ==
Vladimir Lenin signed a decree to create the school, although its emphasis was on art rather than Marxism. Three months after its founding, on 25 February 1921, Lenin went to Vkhutemas to visit the daughter of Inessa Armand and to converse with the students, where in a discussion about art he found an affinity among the artists for Futurism, a movement which Lenin did not approve of. There he first viewed avant garde art, such as suprematist painting. He did not wholly approve of it, expressing concern over the connection between the student's art and politics. After the discussion, Lenin reportedly responded with good humour, "Well, tastes differ" and "I am an old man".

Although Lenin was not an enthusiast for avant garde art, the Vkhutemas faculty and students made projects to honor him and further his politics. Ivan Leonidov's final project at Vkhutemas was his design for a Lenin Institute of Librarianship. A model of Vladimir Tatlin's Monument to the Third International was built by students and displayed at their workshop in Saint Petersburg. Furthermore, Lenin's Mausoleum was designed by faculty member Aleksey Shchusev. Alexei Gan's book Constructivism, published in 1922, provided a theoretical link between the new emerging art and contemporary politics, connecting constructivism with the revolution, and Marxism. The founding decree included a statement that students have an "obligatory education in political literacy and the fundamentals of the communist world view on all courses". These examples help justify the school's projects in terms of the early political requirements but others would arise throughout the school's existence.

== Comparisons with the Bauhaus ==
Vkhutemas was a close parallel to the German Bauhaus in its intent, organization and scope. The two schools were the first to train artist-designers in a modern manner. Both schools were state-sponsored initiatives to merge the craft tradition with modern technology, with a Basic Course in aesthetic principles, courses in color theory, industrial design, and architecture. Vkhutemas was a larger school than the Bauhaus, but it was less publicised and consequently, is less familiar to the West. Vkhutemas's influence was expansive however—the school exhibited two structures by faculty and award-winning student work at the 1925 Exposition in Paris. Furthermore, Vkhutemas attracted the interest and several visits from the director of the Museum of Modern Art, Alfred Barr. With the internationalism of modern architecture and design, there were many exchanges between the Vkhutemas and the Bauhaus. The second Bauhaus director Hannes Meyer attempted to organise an exchange between the two schools, while Hinnerk Scheper of the Bauhaus collaborated with various Vkhutein members on the use of colour in architecture. In addition, El Lissitzky's book Russia – an Architecture for World Revolution published in German in 1930 featured several illustrations of Vkhutemas/Vkhutein projects. Both schools flourished in a relatively liberal period, and were closed under pressure from increasingly totalitarian regimes.

== Renaming into Vkhutein in 1927 and Dissolution in 1930 ==
As early as 1923, Rodchenko and others published a report in LEF which foretold of Vkhutemas's closure. It was in response to students' failure to gain a foothold in industry and was entitled, The Breakdown of VKhUTEMAS: Report on the Condition of the Higher Artistic and Technical Workshops, which stated that the school was "disconnected from the ideological and practical tasks of today". In 1927, the school's name was modified: "Institute" replaced "Studios" (Вхутеин, Высший художественно-технический институт), or Vkhutein. Under this reorganisation, the 'artistic' content of the basic course was reduced to one term, when at one point it was two years. The school appointed a new rector, Pavel Novitsky, who took over from the painter Vladimir Favorsky in 1926 and until 1930. It was under Novitsky's tenure that external political pressures increased, including the "working class" decree, and a series of external reviews by industry, and commercial organisations of student works' viability. The school was dissolved on March 30, 1930, and was merged into various other programs. The Modernist movements which Vkhutemas had helped generate were criticized and denounced as "abstract formalism" in the 1930s, when the "Fight against Formalism in the Art" began in Soviet Russia and were succeeded historically by socialist realism, postconstructivism, and the Empire style of Stalinist architecture.

== The Art Education System after Vkhutemas-Vkhutein dissolution in 1930 ==
The idea behind the dissolution of Vkhutemas-Vkhutein in 1930 was to stop spending time and effort on educating painters and sculptors according to the traditional classic scheme, and to train instead future designers who could be useful at various manufacturing plants of the first Five-Year plan, and at decorating mass demonstrations of working people regularly held in the USSR.

Therefore the painting and sculpture faculties of Moscow Vkhutein were scraped altogether, and their students were transferred to Leningrad where the new Institute of Proletarian Fine Arts was established on the basis of similar painting and sculpture faculties of former Leningrad Vkhutein. F.A. Maslov, official from the Main Directorate of Vocational Education (Glavprofobr) was named its director. Another goal of F.A. Maslov was to replace the students from the former bourgeois classes with the students of purely proletarian origin. Therefore he opened evening classes for the workers, and ordered that those graduating from them must be enrolled in the Institute of Proletarian Fine Arts without exams. The lecture system was abolished and a “brigade team teaching” method was introduced.

However, two years of such experimenting led to such degradation of education processes that in 1932 Maslov was fired, the Institute of Proletarian Fine Arts was abolished, and its Leningrad section and premices were transformed into the new Leningrad Institute of Painting, Architecture and Sculpture - currently, the Saint Petersburg Repin Academy of Arts.

The situation after the dissolution of Vkhutemas-Vkhutein in Moscow remained more complex. The architecture faculty of Vkhutein was merged with MVTU, forming the Architectural-Construction Institute, which became the Moscow Architectural Institute in 1933.

The textile faculty of the former Vkhutein became part of the Moscow Textile Institute.

The graphic arts faculty headed by Vladimir Favorsky merged into the newly created Moscow Polygraphic Institute, also founded in 1930 - currently the Moscow State University of Printing Arts. Vladimir Favorsky did not limit his activities to graphic arts only, and created a painting subsection within his graphic arts faculty. So when the Institute of Proletarian Fine Arts was abolished in 1932, the People's Commissariat for Education headed by Andrei Bubnov, after 2-years pause, decided to create in 1934 a modestly-sized Moscow Institute of Fine Arts on the basis of Favorsky’s painting subsection and its students. Igor Grabar, former Tretyakov gallery director and influential artist, became the Institute’s unofficial curator.

However, as since 1932 the Central Committee was campaiging against Cezanne-influenced dissenting “formalist” painters and sculptors, it was trying to limit the “growth of artistic cadres” in general by leaving just one Fine Arts school in the country - the Leningrad Institute of Painting, Architecture and Sculpture. Therefore in 1932-1937 it suppressed all attempts to transform the Moscow Institute of Fine Arts into a fully-featured art school, on a par with Leningrad Institute of Painting. Only in 1937, when the “formalists” and Cezanne followers were completely defeated, and Igor Grabar and his colleagues guaranteed that the students will be educated strictly according to the Socialist realism canons, the Central Committee agreed on transforming the Moscow Institute of Fine Arts into a full art school, by creating a sculpture faculty in it. Prominent Socialist realist such as Boris Ioganson, Sergey Gerasimov and Alexander Deyneka became its teachers alongside Grabar, ensuring that there will be no deviation from the Party’s “general line” in arts.

In 1948, the Institute was reformed and became known as the Moscow State Art Institute and since that time has been named after Vasily Surikov (now, Moscow Surikov State Academic Institute of Fine Arts). However, until 1950 when the Institute got its own building in Tovarishchesky pereulok, it had no central edifice and its various faculties were scattered throughout Moscow.

== See also ==
- Category:Vkhutemas alumni

== Sources ==
- Bokov, Anna. Avant-Garde as method Vkhutemas and the pedagogy of space, 1920–1930. Zurich: Park Book, 2019. ISBN 9783038601340
- Solomon R. Guggenheim Museum et al. The great utopia : the Russian and Soviet avant-garde, 1915-1932. New York: Guggenheim Museum, 1992. ISBN 9780892070954
- van Helvert, Mariane and Andrea Baldoni. The responsible object : a history of design ideology for the future. Amsterdam: Valiz; Melbourne: Ueberschwarz, 2016. ISBN 9789492095190
