= Andrey Drevin =

Russian sculptor (1921–1996)

Andrei Aleksandrovich Drevin (Russian: Андрей Александрович Древин; 26 August 1921 – 7 April 1996) was a Russian and Soviet sculptor, known for the Monument to I. A. Krylov.

== Biography ==
Drevin was born on the 26 August 1921 in Moscow to Aleksandr Drevin, a Latvian painter, and Nadezhda Udaltsova, a Russian painter, artist and teacher. Drevin studied at the Moscow Surikov State Academic Institute of Fine Arts.

As his father was executed by the NKVD in 1938 and his mother became blacklisted in Soviet art world, Andrei Drevin had found it difficult to establish himself as an artist. However he overcame these challenges and became well known in Moscow due to his 1976 Monument to I. A. Krylov (dedicated to Ivan Krylov) which was erected near Patriarshiye Ponds.

On 7 April 1996 Drevin died in Moscow aged 74.
