= Konrāds Ubāns =

Latvian painter

- Born: Aleksandrs Kārlis Konrāds Ubāns; 31 December 1893; Riga, Governorate of Livonia, Russian Empire (Now Latvia)
- Died: 30 August 1981 (aged 87); Riga, Latvian SSR
- Known for: Painting
- Movement: Impressionism

Konrāds Ubāns (December 31, 1893 – August 30, 1981) was a Latvian painter from Riga. He studied at the Riga Art School and was one of the founding members of the Riga Artists' Group before becoming a professor at the Art Academy of Latvia.

== Biography ==
Konrāds Ubāns was born on December 31, 1893, in Riga. His father was a railway worker. From 1902 until 1910, he studied in a commercial school. Later he studied in the Odessa art school for a half year. In 1911, he started studies in Riga Art school where he studied until 1914, when World War I started. Ubāns together with his family went to Russia, where for a short while he studied in Penza Art School. In 1916, he was drafted into the Imperial Russian Army and served until 1918, when he was demobilized and returned to Latvia.

Ubāns was part of the "Green Flower" association of avant-garde artists, notably with Aleksandrs Drēviņš (lv), Valdemārs Tone (lv) and Kārlis Johansons (lv).

In 1920, his first solo exhibition was held in Riga. In the same year, he started his work in Latvian National Museum of Art as an assistant of museum director Burkarts Dzenis. In 1922, he took a study trip to Germany and France. The next year, his second solo exhibition was held. In 1925, he was addressed by Vilhelms Purvītis and took a job in Art Academy of Latvia as a teacher of painting. In 1946, he was promoted to professor and worked in this post for the rest of his life. In 1959, he was declared as People's Artist of Latvian SSR. In 1980, his last exhibition was held in Riga. Konrāds Ubāns died on August 30, 1981, in Riga. He is buried in the Forest Cemetery.

== Art ==
Konrāds Ubāns is noted mostly for his landscape paintings and the poetic and intimate atmosphere within them. They are rich, harmonious works celebrating the wonder of nature. He mostly painted landscapes of Riga outskirts in Pārdaugava and Daugava river valley especially around Koknese. However, he also has painted many portraits and still lifes. Also, he has worked in graphic art and sculpture. Real maturity in his work can be seen as early as his paintings from the 1920s, when he richly uses motifs and atmosphere of impressionism.
