= Nikolai Tarabukin =

Nikolai Mikhailovich Tarabukin
- Born: August 25, 1889; Spassky, Russian Empire
- Died: February 21, 1956 (aged 66); Moscow, Soviet Union
- Occupation: Art historian

Nikolai Mikhailovich Tarabukin (Russian: Николай Михайлович Тарабукин; 25 August 1889 – 21 February 1956) was an art theoretician active in the Soviet Union. He was one of major theorists of Proletkult.

Tarabukin's first book was Опыт теории живописи (A study in painting theory) which although started in 1916 was not published until 1923. He was influenced by influence of Heinrich Wölfflin.

Although he disavowed Constructivism, he nevertheless helped explain their ideas through such essays as От мольберта к машине (From Easel to Machine) published in 1922.

“The way out of the crisis was found not through the "death" of art, but through the further evolution of its forms, prompted by both the logical process of their development and social conditions. Only in the era of deep decline of social life, art was locked in museum cells. Now art opens a vast horizon of the field in life itself. And no matter how indignant eclectic art critics may be, whatever they may say about the profanation of "holy" art, they cannot keep it in their silos, and, by tearing apart the chains of the museum, it emerges victoriously in life ...”
