= Aleksandr Drevin =

Latvian-Russian painter (1889–1938)

- Aleksandrs Drēviņš; Александр Древин
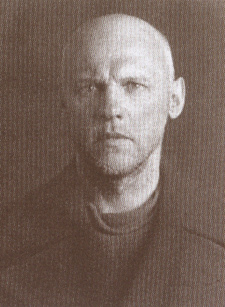
- Drevin following his arrest, 1938
- Born: Aleksandrs Rūdolfs Drēviņš; Александр Давыдович Древин; 15 July 1889; Cēsis, Governorate of Livonia, Russian Empire (now Latvia)
- Died: 26 February 1938 (aged 48); Moscow, Russian SFSR, USSR
- Resting place: Butovo firing range 55°32′00″N 37°35′39″E
- Movement: Green Flower
- Spouse: Nadezhda Udaltsova (m. 1919)
- Children: Andrey Drevin

Aleksandr Davydovich Drevin (Latvian: Aleksandrs Rūdolfs Drēviņš; Russian: Александр Давыдович Древин; 15 July 1889 – 26 February 1938) was a Latvian and Soviet painter. Drevin was executed during the Great Purge as part of the Latvian Operation.

== Biography ==
Drevin was born 15 July 1889 was born in Cēsis, Governorate of Livonia (present-day Latvia).

Drevin attended art school in Riga under Vilhelms Purvītis, thus initially adapting the style of impressionist painting, and first came to Moscow in 1914. He studied under Kuzma Petrov-Vodkin. Since 1917 he worked in the Fine Arts Department of the People's Commissariat of Education. Drevin was part of the "Green Flower" association of avant-garde artists, notably with Konrāds Ubāns, Valdemārs Tone and Kārlis Johansons. Between 1920 and 1921 he was a member of the Inkhuk but later left, together with Wassily Kandinsky, Kliunkov, and Nadezhda Udaltsova, because of the Constructivist-Productivist stylistic manifesto urging the rejection of easel painting. Drevin became a professor of painting at Vkhutemas. In 1922, he was sent to work the First Russian Art Exhibition at the Van Diemen Gallery in Berlin. He travelled across Russia, to Kazakhstan Ural, Altai and Armenia creating a series of artworks of the Soviet landscape. These trips where organised and supervised by Soviet art officials.

Drevin often painted a "brutal primitivism", lacking any political message or any purpose at all. His paintings have been compared to those of Maurice de Vlaminck. Drevin's paintings intentionally were empty of illusionism and decorativeness. After a period of constructivist abstract painting, his style became progressively more realistic during the 1920s.

== Arrest and execution ==
On 17 January 1938, during the Great Purge, as a part of the so-called "Latvian Operation", Drevin was arrested by the NKVD and executed on 26 February at the Butovo firing range near Moscow. He was posthumously rehabilitated in 1957.

== Personal life ==
In 1919, Drevin married Nadezhda Udaltsova. Drevin and Udaltsova had one son, the sculptor Andrey Drevin.

== Gallery ==
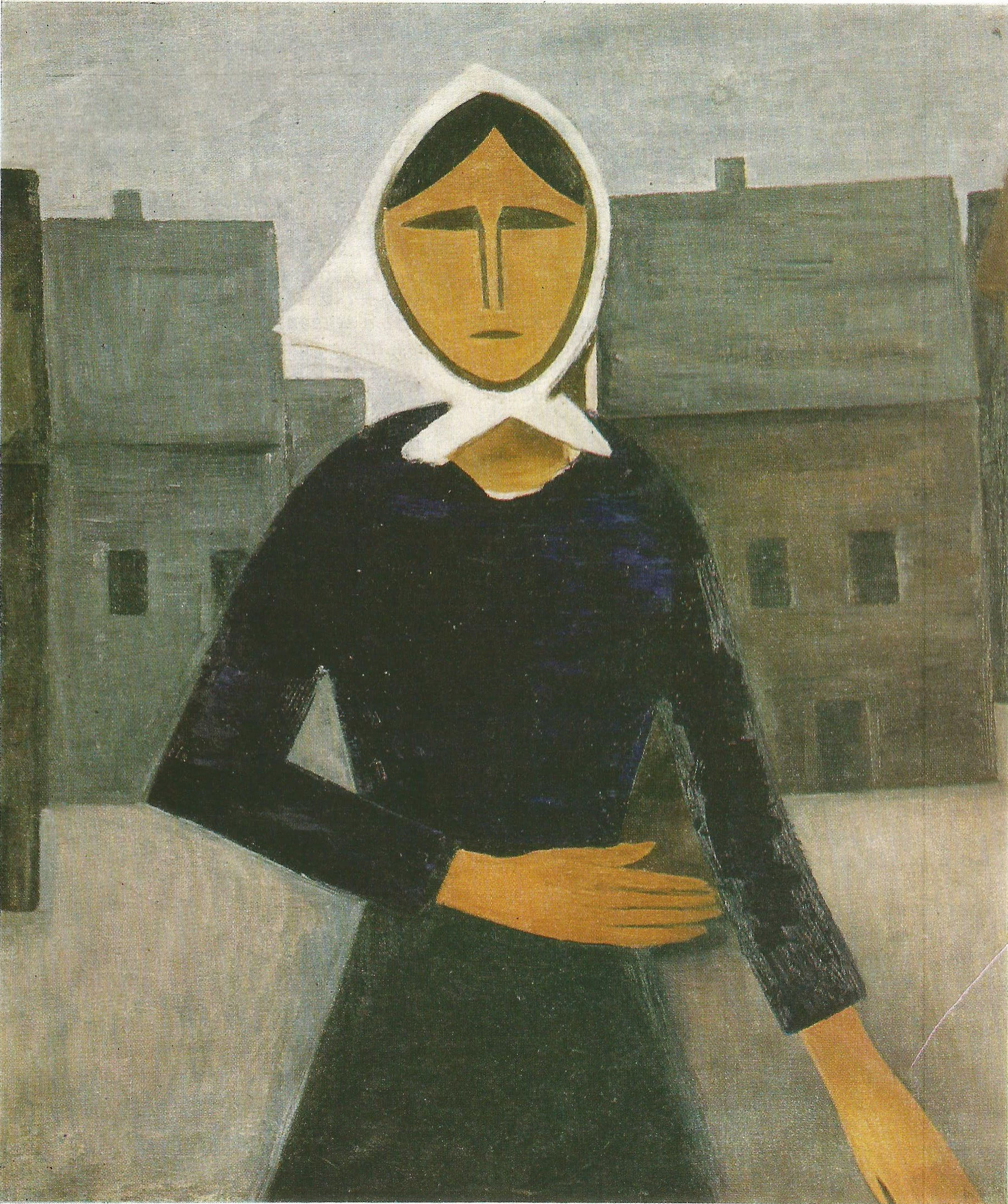
Refugee, 1916

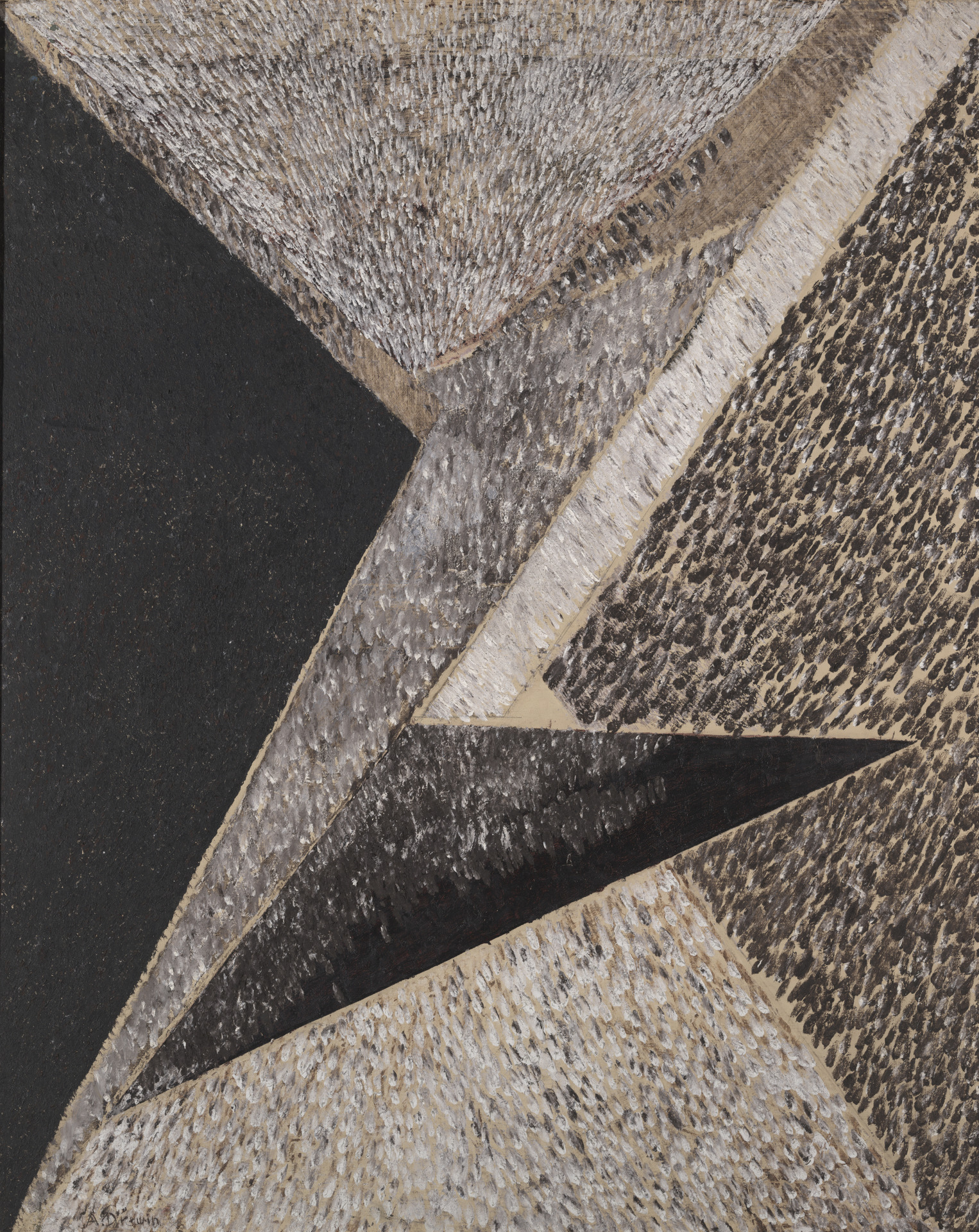
Suprematism (formerly) Abstraction, 1921

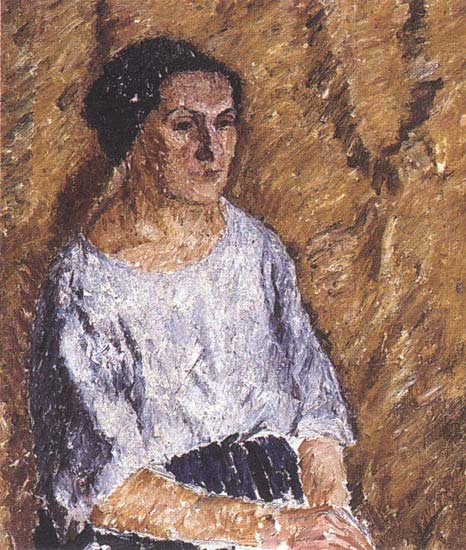
Painting of Nadezhda Udaltsova, 1923

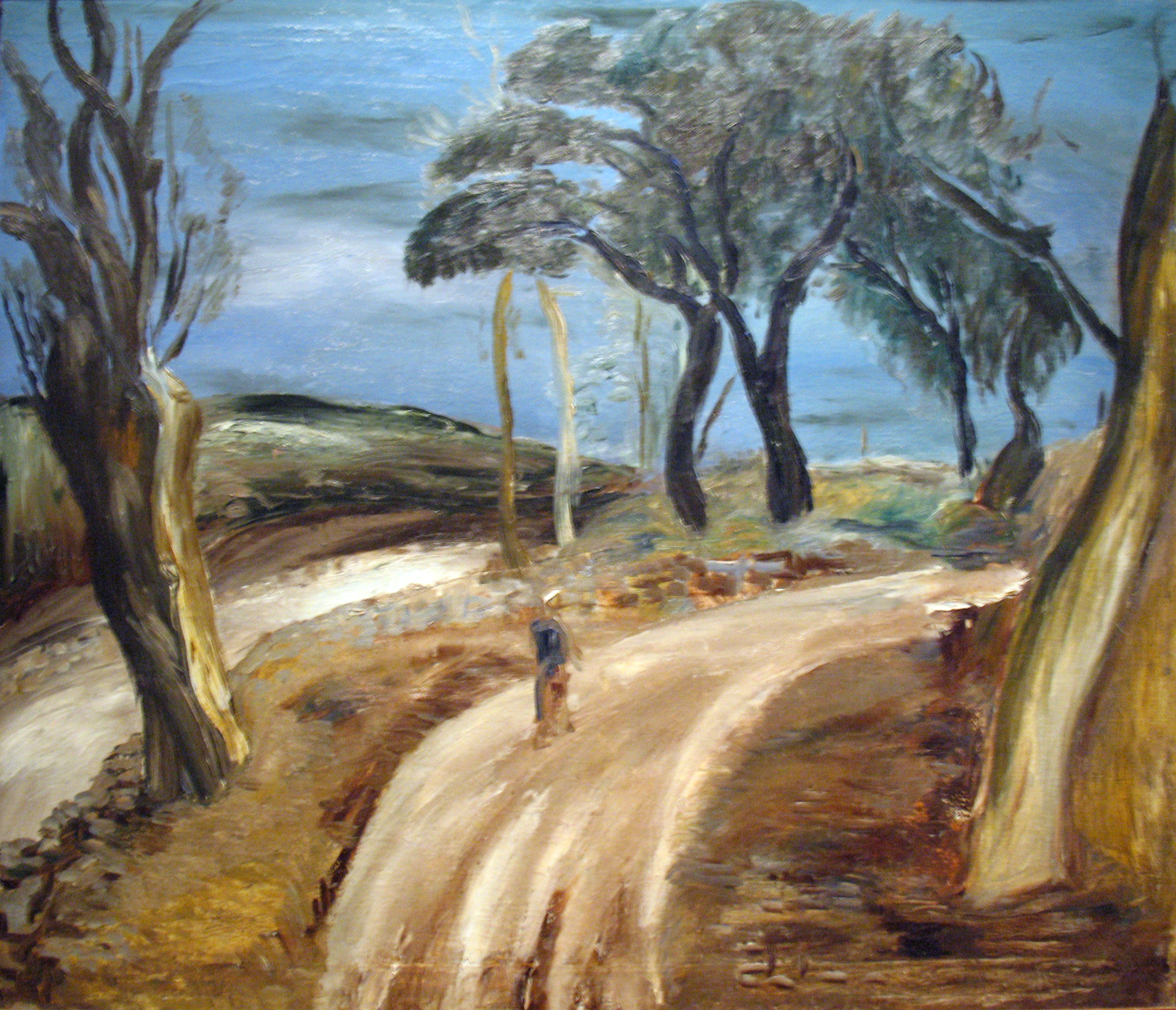
Landscape. Street in Armenia, 1933
