= Varvara Stepanova =

Russian artist (1894–1958)

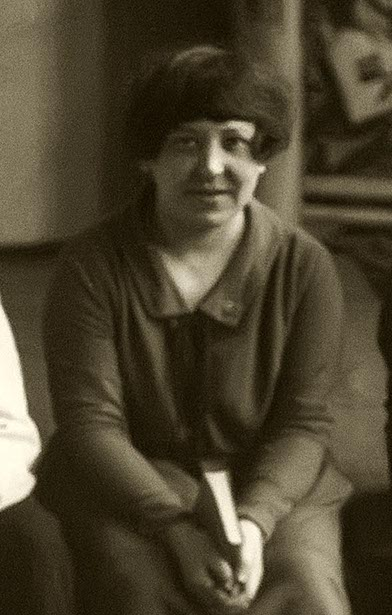
- Varvara Stepanova, 1924
- Born: November 1894; Kovno, Russian Empire
- Died: 20 May 1958 (aged 63); Moscow, Russian SFSR
- Movement: Productivist art, a branch of Constructivism
- Spouse: Alexander Rodchenko

Varvara Fyodorovna Stepanova (Russian: Варва́ра Фёдоровна Степа́нова; 3 November [O.S. 22 October] 1894 (Note: Sources differ regarding the date of birth, in which they wrote either 3, 4 or 9 November based on the Gregorian calendar.) – 20 May 1958) was a Russian artist. With her husband Alexander Rodchenko, she was associated with the Constructivist branch of the Russian avant-garde, which rejected aesthetic values in favour of revolutionary ones. Her activities extended into propaganda, poetry, stage scenery and textile designs.

== Biography ==
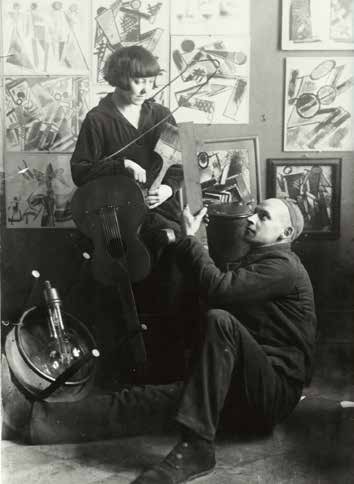
Stepanova and Rodchenko in their studio, 1920s

Varvara Stepanova who was born in Kaunas (in modern-day Lithuania) came from peasant origins but was able to get an education at Kazan Art School, Kazan. There she met her later husband and collaborator Alexander Rodchenko. In the years before the Russian Revolution of 1917 they leased an apartment in Moscow, owned by Wassily Kandinsky. These artists became some of the main figures in the Russian avant-garde. The new abstract art in Russia which began around 1915 was a culmination of influences from Cubism, Italian Futurism and traditional peasant art. She designed Cubo-Futurist work for several artists' books, and studied under Jean Metzinger at Académie de La Palette, an art academy where the painters André Dunoyer de Segonzac and Henri Le Fauconnier also taught.

In the years following the revolution, Stepanova involved herself in poetry, philosophy, painting, graphic art, stage scenery construction, and textile and clothing designs. She contributed work to the Fifth State Exhibition and the Tenth State Exhibition, both in 1919.

In 1920 it came to a division between painters like Kasimir Malevich who continued to paint with the idea that art was a spiritual activity, and those who believed that they must work directly for the revolutionary development of the society. In 1921, together with Aleksei Gan, Rodchenko and Stepanova formed the first Working Group of Constructivists, which rejected fine art in favor of graphic design, photography, posters, and political propaganda. Also in 1921, Stepanova declared in her text for the exhibition 5x5=25, held in Moscow:

Composition is the contemplative approach of the artist. Technique and Industry have confronted art with the problem of construction as an active process and not reflective. The 'sanctity' of a work as a single entity is destroyed. The museum which was the treasury of art is now transformed into an archive.

The term 'Constructivist' was by then being used by the artists themselves to describe the direction their work was taking. The theatre was another area where artists were able to communicate new artistic and social ideas. Stepanova designed the sets for The Death of Tarelkin in 1922.

Alexander Rodchenko died on 3 December 1956, and Varvara Stepanova died on 20 May 1958, both in Moscow.

== Clothing design and textiles ==
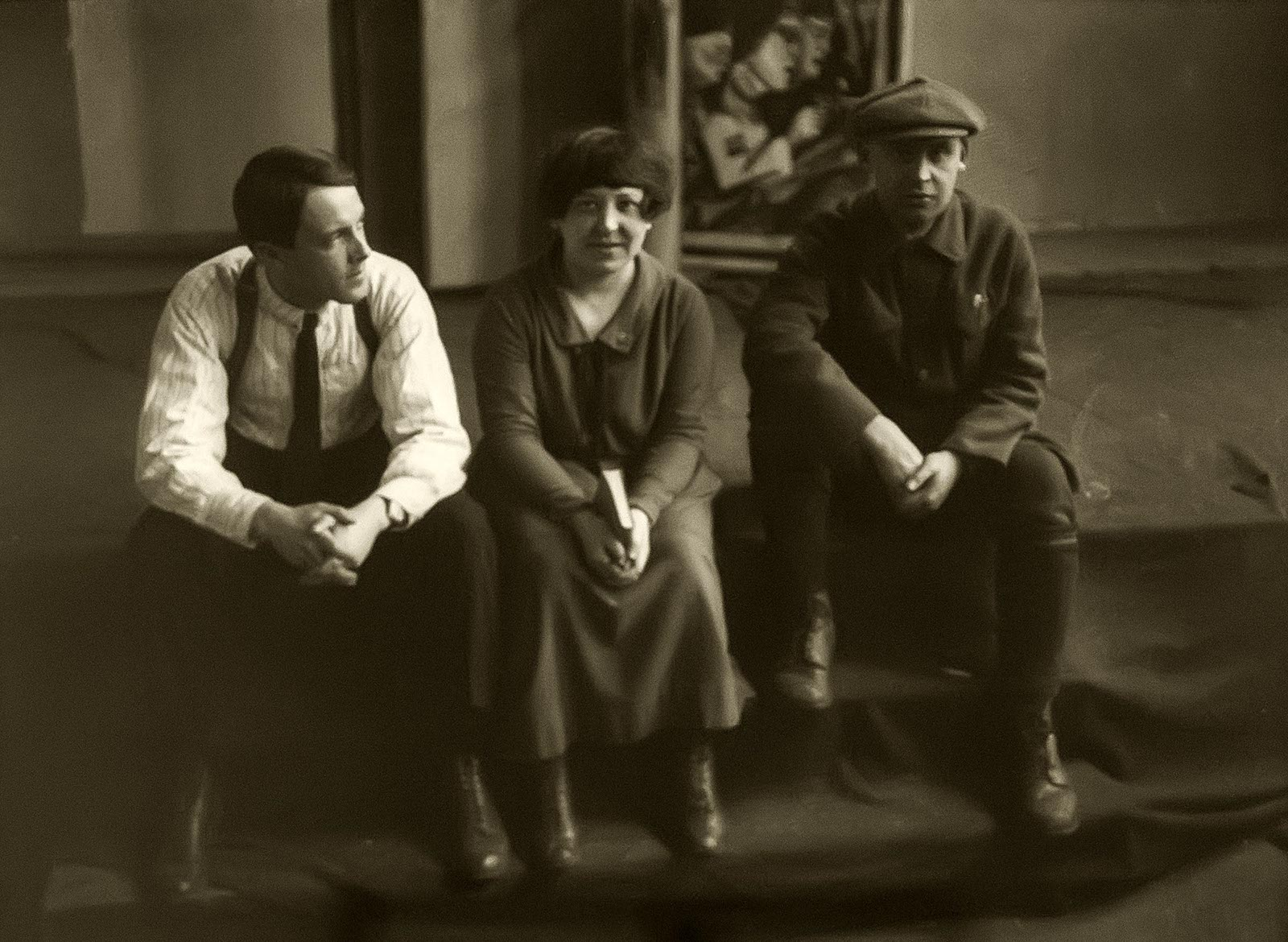
Theater director Vitaly Zhemchuzhny, Stepanova and Rodchenko, 1924

In 1921, Stepanova moved almost exclusively into the realm of production, in which she felt her designs could achieve their broadest impact in aiding the development of the Soviet society. Russian Constructivist clothing represented the destabilization of the oppressive, elite aesthetics of the past and, instead, reflected utilitarian functionality and production. Gender and class distinctions gave way to functional, geometric clothing. In line with this objective, Stepanova sought to free the body in her designs, emphasizing clothing's functional rather than decorative qualities. Stepanova deeply believed clothing must be looked at in action. Unlike the aristocratic clothing that she felt sacrificed physical freedom for aesthetics, Stepanova dedicated herself to designing clothing for particular fields and occupational settings in such a way that the object's construction evinced its function. In addition, she sought to develop expedient means of clothing production through simple designs and strategic, economic use of fabrics.

=== Clothing designs ===
Stepanova, thus, identified clothing as occupying two groups: prozodezhda and sportodezhda. Within these categories, she attended to logical, efficient production and construction of the garments. However, war-induced poverty placed economic restrictions on the Russian Constructivists’ industrial fervor, and their direct engagement with production was never fully realized. Thus, most of her designs were not mass-produced and circulated.

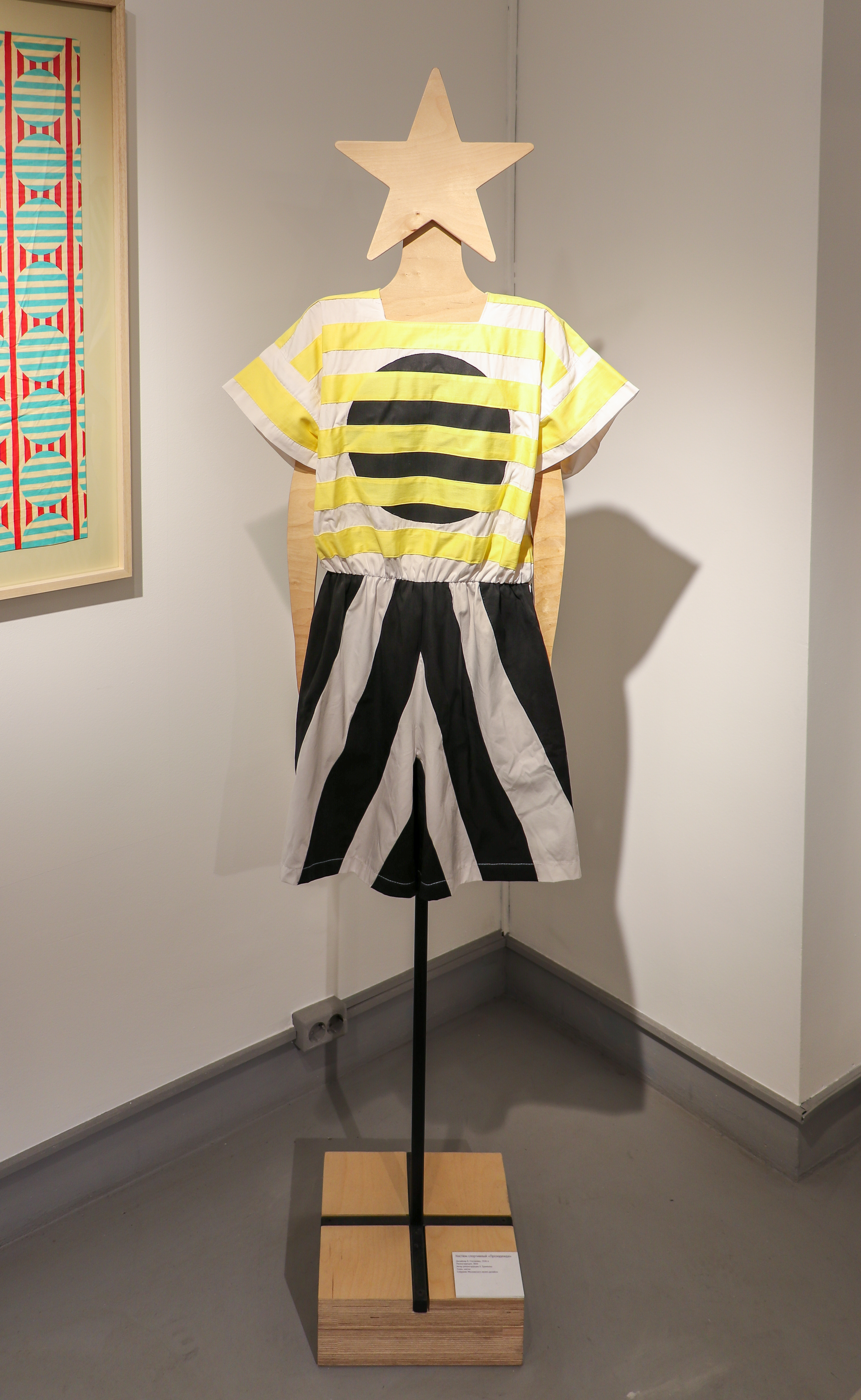
"Prozodezhda" designed by Stepanova in 1920s

The first, prozodezhda, or production/working clothing in basic styles, included theater costumes as well as professional and industrial garments. In the early 1920s, Stepanova entered the clothing industry through her costume designs in theater, in which she translated her artistic affinity for geometric shapes into functional, emblematic clothing. Made of dark blue and grey material, the graphic costumes allowed actors to maximize the appearance of their movements, exaggerating them for the stage and transforming the body into a dynamic composition of geometric shapes and lines.

Within this category, Stepanova began designing spetsodezhda, or clothing specialized for a specific occupation. In doing so, she designed clothing for men and women in both industrial and professional capacities with meticulous consideration of seaming, pockets, and buttons to ensure each aspect of the costume maintained a functional intention. Regardless of the occupational context, her working clothing carried a distinctive geometric and linear edge, rendering the body into a graphic composition and boxy, androgynous form.

The second category, sportodezhda, or sports costumes, also presented bold lines, large forms, and contrasting colors to enable and emphasize the body's movements and allow spectators to easily distinguish one team from the other. Stepanova even rendered the team's emblem into a graphic design. The sports arena offered a context for Stepanova to realize an idealized bodily neutralization, and her uniforms were often unisex with pants and a belted tunic that obscured the human form.

=== Textile production ===
Stepanova carried out her ideal of engaging with industrial production in the following year when she, with Lyubov Popova, became designer of textiles at the Tsindel (the First State Textile Factory) near Moscow, and in 1924 became professor of textile design at the Vkhutemas (Higher Technical Artistic Studios). As a constructivist, Stepanova not only transposed bold graphic designs onto her fabrics, but also focused heavily on their production. Stepanova only worked a little over a year at The First Textile Printing Factory, but she designed more than 150 fabric designs in 1924. Although she was inspired to develop new types of fabric, the current technology restricted her to printed patterns on monotone surfaces. By her own artistic choice, she also limited her color palette to one or two dyes. Although she only used triangles, circles, squares, and lines, Stepanova superimposed these geometric forms onto one another to create a dynamic, multi-dimensional design.

== Graphic design ==
Stepanova practiced typography, book design and contributed to the magazine LEF throughout the early 1920s. As part of a government campaign to promote universal literacy, Stepanova organized a "Book Evening" in 1924. This was a performance that featured characters from pre- and post-revolutionary literature battling each other.

== Legacy ==
On 22 October 2018 Stepanova was honoured with a Google Doodle posthumously on her 124th birthday.

Stepanova's work was included in the 2021 exhibition Women in Abstraction at the Centre Pompidou.

In 2024, dancer Jenna Riegel premiered "Varvara," a solo theatre and dance piece in which she imagines herself as a reincarnation of Varvara Stepanova. Riegel created Varvara as both a response to the constructivist theory of the body as a machine, and inspired by Alexander Rodchenko's "Performing Furniture".

== See also ==
- Anti-art (Note: it is disputed whether or not artwork associated with Varvara Stepanova is indeed "anti-art".)
- Soviet fashion design

== References and sources ==
Notes

Sources

- The Russian Experiment in Art, Camilla Gray, Thames and Hudson,1976
- Avant-garde Russe, Andrei Nakov, Art Data, 1986
- Russian Constructivism, Christina Lodder, Yale University Press, 1985
- Varvara Stepanova, The Complete Works, Alexander Lavrentiev, MIT Press, 1988
