= Alexander Rodchenko =

Russian artist and designer (1891–1956)

Aleksander Rodchenko
- Александр Родченко
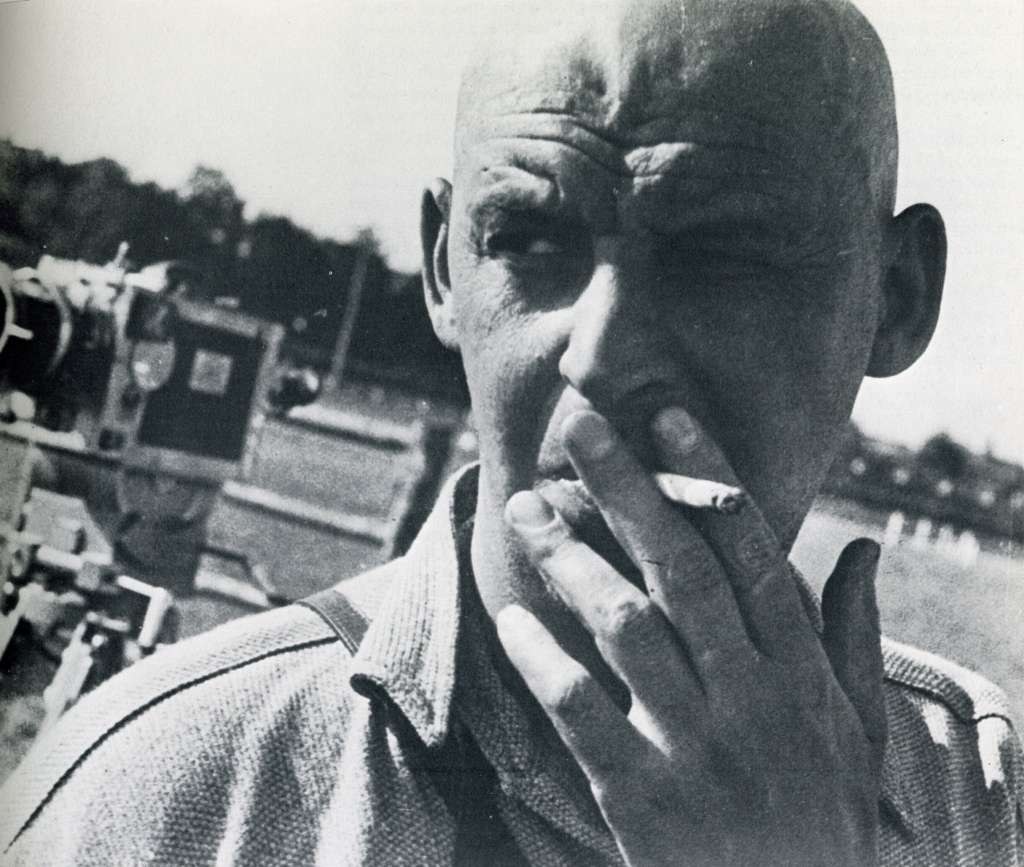
- Rodchenko in 1935
- Born: Aleksander Mikhailovich Rodchenko; 5 December 1891; Saint Petersburg, Russian Empire
- Died: 3 December 1956 (aged 64); Moscow, Russian SFSR, Soviet Union
- Known for: Painting, photography
- Notable work: Books-Poster (1924)
- Movement: Constructivism
- Spouse: Varvara Stepanova

Aleksander Mikhailovich Rodchenko (Russian: Александр Михайлович Родченко; 5 December [O.S. 23 November] 1891 – 3 December 1956) was a Russian and Soviet artist, sculptor, photographer, and graphic designer. He was one of the founders of constructivism and Russian design; he was married to the artist Varvara Stepanova.

Rodchenko was one of the most versatile constructivist and productivist artists to emerge after the Russian Revolution. He worked as a painter and graphic designer before turning to photomontage and photography. His photography was socially engaged, formally innovative, and opposed to a painterly aesthetic. Concerned with the need for analytical-documentary photo series, he often shot his subjects from odd angles—usually high above or down below—to shock the viewer and to postpone recognition. He wrote: "One has to take several different shots of a subject, from different points of view and in different situations, as if one examined it in the round rather than looked through the same key-hole again and again."

He is also known for developing the early corporate identity of the airline Dobrolyot, later Aeroflot, and designed its "Winged Hammer and Sickle" logo.

== Life and career ==
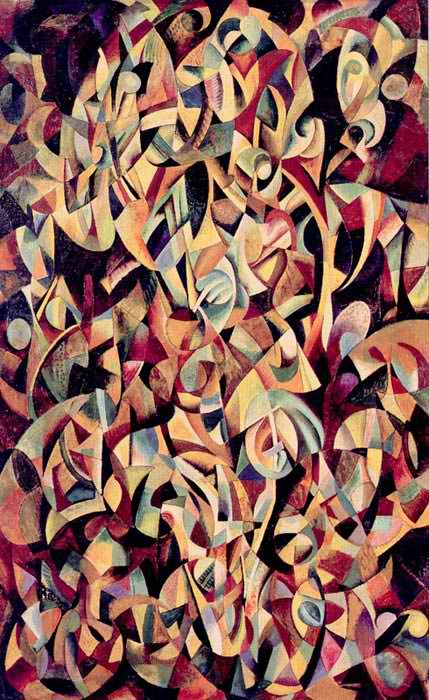
Alexander Rodchenko Dance. An Objectless Composition, 1915.

Rodchenko was born in St. Petersburg to a working-class family who moved to Kazan after the death of his father, in 1909. He became an artist without having had any exposure to the art world, drawing much inspiration from art magazines. In 1910, Rodchenko began studies under Nicolai Fechin and Georgii Medvedev at the Kazan Art School, where he met Varvara Stepanova, whom he later married.

After 1914, he continued his artistic training at the Stroganov Institute in Moscow, where he created his first abstract drawings, influenced by the Suprematism of Kazimir Malevich, in 1915. The following year, he participated in "The Store" exhibition organized by Vladimir Tatlin, who was another formative influence.

Rodchenko's work was heavily influenced by Cubism and Futurism, as well as by Malevich's Suprematist compositions, which featured geometric forms deployed against a white background. While Rodchenko was a student of Tatlin's he was also his assistant, and the interest in figuration that characterized Rodchenko's early work disappeared as he experimented with the elements of design. He used a compass and ruler in creating his paintings, with the goal of eliminating expressive brushwork.

Rodchenko worked in Narkompros and he was one of the organisers of RABIS. RABIS was formed in 1919–1920.

Rodchenko was appointed Director of the Museum Bureau and Purchasing Fund by the Bolshevik Government in 1920, responsible for the reorganization of art schools and museums. He became secretary of the Moscow Artists' Union and set up the Fine Arts Division of the People's Commissariat for Education, and helped found the Institute for Artistic Culture.

He taught from 1920 to 1930 at the Higher Technical-Artistic Studios (VKhUTEMAS/VKhUTEIN), a Bauhaus organization with a "checkered career". It was disbanded in 1930.

In 1921 he became a member of the Productivist group, with Stepanova and Aleksei Gan, which advocated the incorporation of art into everyday life. He gave up painting to concentrate on graphic design for posters, books, and films. He was deeply influenced by the ideas and practice of the filmmaker Dziga Vertov, with whom he worked intensively in 1922.

Impressed by the photomontage of the German Dadaists, Rodchenko began his own experiments in the medium, first employing found images in 1923, and from 1924 on, shooting his own photographs as well. His first published photomontage illustrated Mayakovsky's poem, "About This", in 1923. In 1924, Rodchenko produced what is likely his most famous poster, an advertisement for the Lengiz Publishing House sometimes titled "Books", which features a young woman with a cupped hand shouting "книги по всем отраслям знания" (Books in all branches of knowledge), printed in modernist typography.

From 1923 to 1928 Rodchenko collaborated closely with Mayakovsky (of whom he took several portraits) on the design and layout of LEF and Novy LEF, the publications of Constructivist artists. Many of his photographs appeared in or were used as covers for these and other journals. His images eliminated unnecessary detail, emphasised dynamic diagonal composition, and were concerned with the placement and movement of objects in space. During this period, he and Stepanova painted the well-known panels of the Mosselprom building in Moscow. Their daughter, Varvara Rodchenko, was born in 1925.

== Criticism and censorship ==
Throughout the 1920s, Rodchenko's work was very abstract. Rodchenko joined the October Group of artists in 1928 but was expelled three years later, charged with "formalism", an accusation first raised in the pages of Sovetskoe Foto in 1928.

As changes developed in the Soviet Union in the late 1920s (particularly the exiles of Leon Trotsky in 1928 and from the Soviet Union entirely in 1929, along with the rise of Joseph Stalin), so did the form by which Soviet art was expected to conform to. In the 1930s, with the changing Party guidelines governing artistic practice in favor of Socialist realism, the artist and photographer saw mounting criticism from state-sponsored art critics and the Party. Osip Brik, a well-established author and art critic who was similarly entrenched in the politics and evolving art-culture, offered what was scathing criticism at the time for the photographer’s series on The Building on Miasnitskaia Street and Pine Trees in Pushkino, saying, “one should not depict an isolated building or tree, which may be beautiful but which will be a painting, will be aesthetic.” Similarly to Brik, Sergei Tretyakov attacked Aleksandr Rodchenko’s stylized work, saying, “Instead of exploring the whole range of utilitarian goals confronting photography, Rodchenko is only interested in its aesthetic function. He reduces its activity to simply a reeducation of taste based on certain new principles. We are seeking ‘a new aesthetics’: the capacity to see the world in a new way.”

In 1935, the Masters of Soviet Art exhibition was held, but Rodchenko was only allowed to produce work for the exhibit under the command that he publicly denounce his previous formalist works. The self-denouncement was published in Sovetskoe Foto, adding insult to injury. "Henceforth I want to decisively reject putting formal solutions to a theme in the first place and ideological ones in second place; and at the same time I want to search inquisitively for new riches in the language of photography, in order, with its help, to create works that will stand on a high political and artistic level, works in which the photographic language will fully serve Socialist Realism.”

Despite denouncement and censorship, Rodchenko oscillated between conformity and rebellion in his work, producing one of his most famous photos in 1934, Girl with Leica, which followed similar stylistic choices to the artist and photographer's prior work.

== Retirement and death ==
He returned to painting in the late 1930s, stopped photographing in 1942, and produced abstract expressionist works in the 1940s. He continued to organize photography exhibitions for the government during these years. He died in Moscow in 1956.

== Influence ==
Lilya Brik saying "BOOKS in all branches of knowledge", 1924

Rodchenko's work in graphic design, photocollage, and photography has been described by the Museum of Modern Art as producing "lasting innovations" in those fields, with a continuing impact on younger generations in advertising, book design, and photography. MoMA has also noted that artists such as Andy Warhol and Barbara Kruger used techniques pioneered by Gustav Klutsis, Rodchenko, and El Lissitzky, including collage, photomontage, text, and bold colors and designs. Kruger's reduced red, white, and black palette and clear typography have specifically been described as influenced by Russian Constructivist aesthetics, particularly Rodchenko. Rodchenko has also been an explicit point of reference for later appropriation art, including Sherrie Levine's 1987 photographic series After Rodchenko 1–12. In street art and graphic design, a description of Shepard Fairey's 2018 exhibition at the Moscow Museum of Modern Art stated that the Russian avant-garde, particularly Rodchenko and the Stenberg brothers, inspired the Constructivist element of Fairey's art. HENI News has discussed Rodchenko in relation to Configuratism, placing his Constructivist practice within a broader modernist lineage associated with geometric and functional aesthetics.

His portrait of Lilya Brik has inspired a number of subsequent works, including the cover art for a number of music albums. Among them are the influential Dutch punk band The Ex, which published a series of 7" vinyl albums, each with a variation on the Lilya Brik portrait theme, the cover of Mike + the Mechanics album Word of Mouth, and the cover of the Franz Ferdinand album You Could Have It So Much Better. The poster for One-Sixth Part of the World was the basis for the cover of "Take Me Out", also by Franz Ferdinand.

== The end of painting ==
In 1921, Rodchenko executed the first true monochrome paintings, first displayed in the 5x5=25 exhibition in Moscow. For artists of the Russian Revolution, Rodchenko's radical action was full of utopian possibility. It marked the end of easel painting – perhaps even the end of art – along with the end of bourgeois norms and practices. It cleared the way for the beginning of a new Russian life, a new mode of production, a new culture. Rodchenko later proclaimed, "I reduced painting to its logical conclusion and exhibited three canvases: red, blue, and yellow. I affirmed: it's all over."

== Photobooks (published posthumously) ==
- Alexander Rodchenko. Edited by National Center of Cinematography and the moving image. New York: Pantheon, 1987. ISBN 0-394-75624-X
- Rodchenko – Photography – 1924 - 1954. Edited by Alexander Lavrentiev. Cologne: Könemann, 1995. ISBN 3-89508-110-8
- Rodchenko. Edited by Peter MacGill. Göttingen: Steidl, 2012. ISBN 978-3-869302-45-4

== See also ==
- Anti-art
- List of Russian artists
- Russian avant-garde
