= Novy LEF =

Soviet-era literary-critical periodical

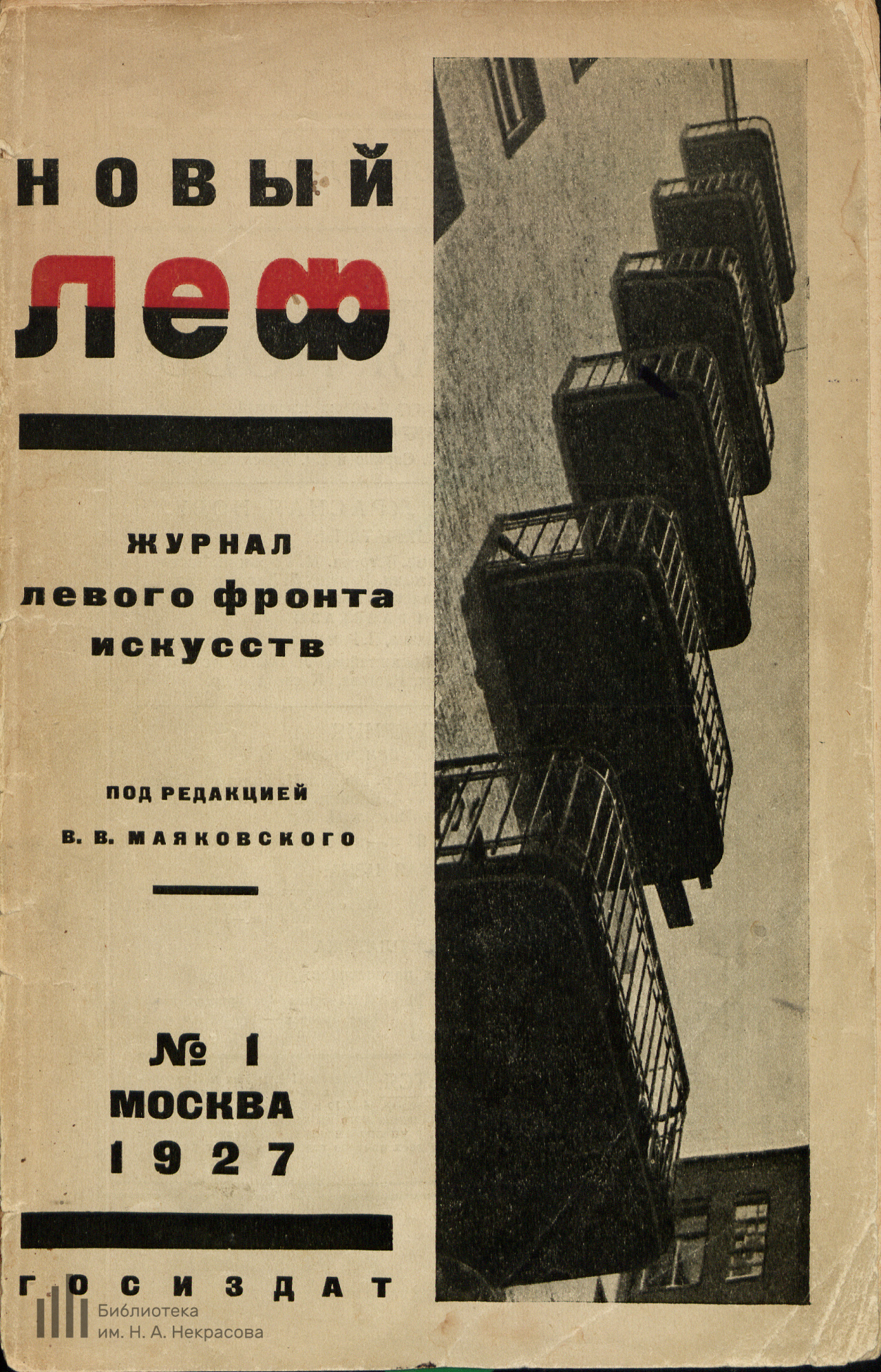
First edition title page

Novyi LEF (Russian: Новый Леф, The New Left Front of the Arts) was a Soviet literary-critical journal published from 1927 to 1928 in Moscow. It was a revival of the earlier LEF journal and was associated with the LEF literary group, which promoted avant-garde and constructivist approaches to art and literature. The journal featured contributions from prominent figures like Vladimir Mayakovsky, who served as editor-in-chief, and Alexander Rodchenko, who designed many of its covers. Novyi LEF was known for its emphasis on factography and production-oriented constructivism, rejecting traditional aesthetics in favor of a revolutionary transformation of Soviet culture.

== Ideology ==
Novyi LEF included a variety of members of the Soviet literary and artistic avant-garde, as well as critics and academicians. In 1922, Mayakovsky offered a definition of LEF: “encompassing of the social theme by all the instruments of futurism” – this emphasis on avant-garde methods in the service of Soviet social necessity continued to define Novyi LEF’s orientation five years later.

Novyi LEF rejected aesthetics or belletrism as well as traditional methods of realist representation in favor of production-oriented constructivism. The journal’s contributors often polemicized against competing literary groups, including RAPP (The Russian Association of Proletarian Writers) and Pereval (“Mountain Pass”).

Mayakovsky’s programmatic editorial statement in the inaugural January 1927 issue reflected on the challenges facing Soviet cultural life. He wrote:

Reviving the LEF periodical as Novyi LEF was a necessity, for according to Mayakovsky, Soviet culture after the New Economic Policy (NEP) was stuck in a “swamp.” Multiple years of NEP “philistinism” had led to cultural degeneration.

Mayakovsky and his affiliates argued that a return to factography and zhiznestroenie – two key planks in the Novyi LEF platform – would rejuvenate a truly revolutionary workers’ literary and cultural production.

== Literature of Fact ==
The LEF emphasis on factual reporting heralded a return to the unvarnished objective world versus manufactured artistic unity. The material of life itself would generate artistic forms suitable for contemporaneity’s expression. The newspaper and attendant journalistic genres (e.g., reportage, sketches, travel accounts) were lauded: Novyi LEF contributors regarded the newspaper medium as being conducive to a fact-oriented marriage between the literary and journalistic spheres, one that would be sensitive to the social necessities generated by Soviet modernity.

Tretyakov maintained: “Our epos is the newspaper…What the Bible was to the medieval Christian – a pointer for all the contingencies of life; what the moralizing novel was to the Russian liberal intelligentsia, that is the newspaper for the Soviet activist of our times."

LEF contributors would sometimes publish their literary and critical projects in their intermediate stages. For example, Viktor Shklovsky’s study of Lev Tolstoy’s novel, War and Peace, was published in Novyi LEF No. 10, 1927, with the subtitle “Plan issledovaniia” (“Research Plan”). Mayakovsky also discussed his pre-writing for a screenplay entitled “Kak pozhivaete?” (“How Do You Do?”) in a question-and-answer format, publishing a portion of his storyboard skeleton of the film’s plot. By exposing research and creative processes, Novyi LEF attempted to demystify the process of artistic production and thereby began to initiate the reader into the ranks of cultural producers.

== The Role of Poetry ==
Agitational poetry continued to be given pride of place under Mayakovsky’s editorship. Leading Soviet poets including Mayakovsky himself and Nikolai Aseev, as well as the futurist poets Semyon Kirsanov and Petr Neznamov, all published rhetorical verse oriented toward contemporary life in Novyi LEF. Their poetic contributions included:

- “Literaturnyi fel’eton” ("Literary Feuilleton", Aseev)
- “Puteshestvie po Moskve” ("Travels Around Moscow", Neznamov)
- “Moia imeninnaia: Poema” ("My Name's Day: A Narrative Poem", Kirsanov)
- “Oktiabr’” ("October", Mayakovsky)

Interactions between the journal’s readers and its editors/contributors were publicized in the journal’s pages. One particular form of reader-editor interaction occurred frequently in the first few issues in 1928: beginning poets eager for feedback on their verse would submit their poems accompanied with a note asking for an evaluation of their poetry. Novyi LEF poets and critics – including Aseev, Mayakovsky, and Vladimir Trenin – in about a half-dozen instances in the 1927-28 print run, published the aspiring poet’s introductory note, their verse, as well as comments and remarks that indicated the correspondent’s strengths and weaknesses as a poet.

== Changes in Editorial Vision ==
After editorial disagreements between Mayakovsky and Tretyakov, Tretyakov took over as chief editor in August 1928; he initiated a pivot away from poetry toward the supposedly more “progressive” genre of prose. In the September 1928 issue, Igor Terentiev critically summarized Mayakovsky’s reasons for abandoning the Novyi LEF journal and the LEF movement overall, which included editorial disagreements with Tretyakov. Mayakovsky’s abdication from the editorship of Novyi LEF triggered an exodus among long-standing contributors. After July 1928, Aseev, Osip Brik, and poet Aleksei Khruchyonykh never again published in the journal’s pages.

The final five issues of Novyi LEF display a marked increase in the number of essays and critical prose, with a conspicuous absence of poetry. It was in issues No. 10 and 11 that literary critic Nikolai Chuzhak developed at considerable length his theory of “zhiznestroenie” (in effect, factographic literature as “life building”).

Mayakovsky went on to form the short-lived REF group (Russian: Революционный фронт искусств, Revolutionary Front of the Arts) in 1929 along with Brik, Aseev, and Rodchenko. He subsequently joined RAPP in 1930, before his suicide in April of that year.

== Novyi LEF in America ==
The eventual founding director of the Museum of Modern Art (MoMA) in New York City, Alfred H. Barr Jr., became acquainted with multiple members of the LEF group during his visit to Moscow in 1928. Barr’s letters and journal diary attest to his veneration of the LEF members' creative energies and vision. He wrote in his journal: “Russia has at least a century of greatness before her, […] she will wax while France and England wane.”

The MoMA has digitized Rodchenko’s Novyi LEF cover artworks, which were displayed in the 2012-2013 exhibition, “The Shaping of New Visions: Photography, Film, Photobook.”

== Contributors ==
After editorial disagreements between Mayakovsky and Tretyakov, Tretyakov took over as chief editor in August 1928; he initiated a pivot away from poetry toward the supposedly more “progressive” genre of prose. In the September 1928 issue, Igor Terentiev critically summarized Mayakovsky’s reasons for abandoning the Novyi LEF journal and the LEF movement overall, which included editorial disagreements with Tretyakov. Mayakovsky’s abdication from the editorship of Novyi LEF triggered an exodus among long-standing contributors. After July 1928, Aseev, Osip Brik, and poet Aleksei Khruchyonykh never again published in the journal’s pages.

The final five issues of Novyi LEF display a marked increase in the number of essays and critical prose, with a conspicuous absence of poetry. It was in issues No. 10 and 11 that literary critic Nikolai Chuzhak developed at considerable length his theory of “zhiznestroenie” (in effect, factographic literature as “life building”).

Mayakovsky went on to form the short-lived REF group (Russian: Революционный фронт искусств, Revolutionary Front of the Arts) in 1929 along with Brik, Aseev, and Rodchenko. He subsequently joined RAPP in 1930, before his suicide in April of that year.

- Viktor Shklovsky
- Vladimir Trenin
- Vladimir Mayakovsky
- Boris Arvatov
- Osip Brik
- Nikolai Aseev
- Nikolai Chuzhak
- Alexander Rodchenko
- Sergei Tretyakov
- Viktor Pertsov
- Petr Neznamov
- Vitalii Zhemchuzhnyi
- Igor Terentiev
- Semyon Kirsanov

== See also ==
- LEF (journal)

== Bibliography ==
- Brown, Edward J. “Lef (Levyi front iskusstva – Left Front of Art), and Novyi Lef.” Handbook of Russian Literature. Ed. Victor Terras. New Haven: Yale University Press, 1985: 244.
- Kornienko, Natalia. “Literary Criticism and Cultural Policy During the New Economic Policy, 1921-1927.”
- A History of Russian Literary Theory and Criticism: The Soviet Age and Beyond. Ed. Evgeny Dobrenko and Galin Tihanov. Pittsburg: University of Pittsburgh Press, 2011: 17-42.
- Shvetsova, L.K. “’Lef’ [zhurnal].” Kratkaia literaturnaia entsiklopediia. Red. A.A. Surkov. Moskva: T. 4, 1967: 172. http://feb-web.ru/feb/kle/kle-abc/ke4/ke4-1721.htm?cmd=p&istext=1 Retrieved 2021-05-01.
- Stephan, Halina. “Left Art.” Handbook of Russian Literature. Ed. Victor Terras. New Haven: Yale University Press, 1985: 244.
- Svatukhina, E.N. “Zhurnal ‘Novyi Lef’ kak istoricheskii istochnik dlia izucheniia deiatel’nosti ob’edineniia ‘Levyi front iskusstv.” Kul’tura. Dukhovnost’. Obshchestvo. 1, 2012: 62-70.
- Zagorets, Iaroslav. “Iz istorii vzaimootnoshenii ‘Lefa’ i ‘Novogo Lefa.’” Vestnik Tambovskogo universiteta. Seriia: Gumanitarnye nauki. 2010: 127-132.
