= Mark Azadovsky =

Soviet scholar of folk-tales and Russian literature

Mark Konstantinovich Azadovsky
- Марк Константинович Азадовский
- Born: December 18, 1888; Irkutsk
- Died: November 24, 1954 (aged 65); Leningrad
- Occupations: Folklorist, literary critic, ethnographer, bibliographer

Mark Konstantinovich Azadovsky (Russian: Марк Константи́нович Азадо́вский; 18 December 1888 in Irkutsk – 24 November 1954 in Leningrad) was a Soviet scholar of folk-tales and Russian literature. As the head of the Folklore department at Leningrad State University during Stalin's anticosmopolitan campaigns of 1948-1953, he was denounced and fired along with Boris Eikhenbaum, Viktor Zhirmunsky, and Grigory Gukovsky. Their scholarly work was expunged from literary journals and their names erased from all indices, footnotes, and bibliographies. After his expulsion from Leningrad State University, Azadovsky began to suffer heart trouble, complications of which led to his death in 1954.
