= LEF (journal) =

1920s Soviet art journal

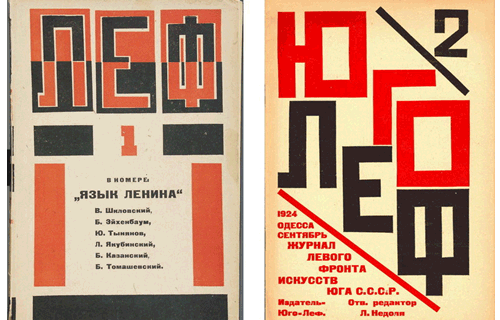
- The first two issues of the journal
- Categories: Art
- First issue: 1923; 103 years ago
- Final issue: 1929; 97 years ago
- Country: Soviet Union
- Language: Russian

LEF (ЛЕФ) was the journal of the Left Front of the Arts (Russian: Левый фронт искусств, romanized: Levy Front Iskusstv), a wide-ranging association of avant-garde writers, photographers, critics and designers in the Soviet Union. It had two runs, one from 1923 to 1925 as LEF, and later from 1927 to 1929 as Novy LEF ('New LEF'). The journal's objective, as set out in one of its first issues, was to "re-examine the ideology and practices of so-called leftist art, and to abandon individualism to increase art's value for developing communism."

== Productivism ==
Although LEF was broad in its choices of writers, it mainly reflected the concerns of the Productivist left-wing of Constructivism. The editors were Osip Brik and Vladimir Mayakovsky: fittingly, one a Russian Formalist critic and one a poet and designer who helped compose the 1912 manifesto of Russian Futurists entitled, "A Slap in the Face of Public Taste". The covers were designed by Alexander Rodchenko, and featured photomontages early on, being followed by photographs in New LEF. Varvara Stepanova also designed covers.

Among the writings published in LEF for the first time were Mayakovsky's long poem About This, and Sergei Eisenstein's The Montage of Attractions, as well as more political and journalistic works like Isaac Babel's Red Cavalry. The journal had funding from the state, and was discussed critically, but not unsympathetically by Leon Trotsky in Literature and Revolution (1924).

== Factography ==
Buchloh asserts that, in response to a profound crisis in representation, audience, and social function, factography became the dominant method of the second phase of the Russian avant-garde because the avant-garde concluded that it had exhausted the possibilities of modernist self-reflection and could no longer justify an art addressed primarily to a specialised elite.

The later New LEF (Новый ЛЕФ, Novy LEF), which was edited by Mayakovsky along with the playwright, screenplay writer and photographer Sergei Tretyakov, tried to popularise the concept of factography (or the "literature of fact"): the idea that journalism, film, photography, and mass media technologies should be utilised by the working class for the production of works counter to bourgeois fictional texts, or as Fore encapsulates it, 'reality without realism'

New LEF ceased publication in 1929 after disagreement between editors Tretyakov, who increasingly promoted factography and documentary prose, and Mayakovsky, who persevered in his commitment to the Futurist literary project. The journal's demise occurred when avant-garde experimentation was attacked as "Formalism" and during the political-cultural shift that would institutionalise Socialist Realism.

Tretyakov brought factography into German left-wing intellectual culture, when he spent spent nearly six months in Germany, from October 1930 to April 1931, lecturing on Soviet literary practice and collective farm reportage. Thus factography had influence on theorists in the West, especially on German left intellectuals, Walter Benjamin and Bertolt Brecht, who attended or knew of these discussions. Linked journals also appeared such as the Constructivist architectural journal SA (edited by Moisei Ginzburg and Alexander Vesnin) and Proletarskoe Foto, on photography.

== Selected contributors ==
- Boris Arvatov
- Isaac Babel
- Osip Brik
- Nikolai Chuzhak
- Sergei Eisenstein
- Aleksei Gan
- Aleksei Gastev
- Aleksei Kruchyonykh
- Boris Kušner
- Vladimir Mayakovsky
- Boris Pasternak
- Liubov Popova
- Alexander Rodchenko
- Viktor Shklovsky
- Sergei Tretyakov
- Varvara Stepanova
- Dziga Vertov

== The Lenin issue ==
After Vladimir Lenin's death on January 21, 1924, LEF's first issue of the year dedicated its critical section to the Soviet leader (though the publication's artistic prose and poetry were not Lenin-themed). These critical articles mainly focused on an analysis of Lenin's writing and his oratory: this is because the Formalist critic Viktor Shklovsky independently organized the project and presented it to LEF. Mayakovsky contributed an unsigned editorial to the issue, in which he criticized the newly forming habit of Soviet authorities to "canonize" Lenin by mass-producing commercial objects with his portrait or likeness on them. The editorial argued that this practice would undermine Lenin's significance for future generations. In Mayakovsky's words, "Don't take away his living gait and human traits, which he was able to preserve as he guided history. Lenin is still our contemporary. He is among the living. We need him alive, not dead." The other articles do not explicitly develop this point, although they do focus on certain unusual, "human" particularities of Lenin's style.

In total, six writers contributed articles to the critical section of the issue. Their names and the titles of their works follow:

1. Shklovsky - "Lenin as Decanonizer" (Ленин, как деканонизатор)
2. Boris Eikhenbaum - "Basic Stylistic Tendencies in Lenin's Speech" (Основные стилевые тенденции в речи Ленина)
3. Lev Yakubinsky - "On Lenin's Deflation of the High Style" (О снижении высокого стиля у Ленина)
4. Yuri Tynyanov - "Lenin's Lexicon as a Polemicist" (Словарь Ленина-полемиста)
5. Boris Kazansky - "Lenin's Speech - An Attempt at Rhetorical Analysis" (Речь Ленина: Опыт риторического анализа)
6. Boris Tomashevsky - "The Construction of the Theses" (Конструкция тезисов)

All of these men either belonged to one of two Formalist collectives, OPOJAZ (The Society For the Study of Poetic Language) and the Moscow Linguistic Circle, or were associated with them. Accordingly, their contributions to this issue of LEF focus on Lenin's specific rhetorical techniques, and not on his broader historical or social importance, which is only alluded to in passing in the articles. Since these authors share certain theoretical assumptions about language and rhetoric, moreover, the articles often overlap in the specific topics of their investigations, and produce a stable group of core conclusions about Lenin's style.

Defamiliarization: Defamiliarization, which can broadly be defined as the idea that the power of a work of art depends on how effectively it defies norms and subverts audiences' expectations, is one of the most important and long-standing ideas in Formalist theory. It emerges as early as 1916, in Viktor Shklovsky's manifesto "Art as Device". It is therefore unsurprising that several of the articles explain Lenin's ability to communicate ideas effectively, an end he achieved through successfully defamiliarizing, or disrupting, stale, established revolutionary language. As Shklovsky writes, "His style consists in downplaying the revolutionary phrase, in replacing its traditional words with workaday synonyms." Tynyanov also pays attention to this aspect of Lenin's style, arguing that he was always intently focused on whether or not the words that he was using at a given moment were "in sync" with the material realities that they were meant to describe, and that this attention to specificity was more important for Lenin than pretty-sounding turns of phrase.

Lowering language: As a result of Lenin's defamiliarization, his speeches and writing begin to seem “artless” in their straightforwardness. Kazansky, along with others, acknowledges this explicitly: “Lenin’s discourse always comes across as direct, artless, even colorless and indifferent… but this is not so.” The Formalists do not intend this to be a criticism of Lenin's rhetoric: they instead argue that his atypical style was a pragmatic and effective rhetorical device itself, one that both set Lenin apart from his contemporaries and rivals (e.g., Leon Trotsky) and convinced his audience of his sincerity: “Nobody suspects Lenin’s discourse of artificiality and pretentiousness: it is utterly pragmatic.” Eikhenbaum and Shklovsky suggest that Lenin shares this quality with established writers, such as Tolstoy and Mayakovsky. In his article, Yakubinsky uses the word “deflation” to describe Lenin's antipathy to the traditional high style of Russian oratory.

Polemics and parody: Another essential element of Lenin's success was his willingness to openly mock his enemies, both in print and in his speeches. Eikhenbaum and Tynyanov suggest that Lenin's constant criticism of writings from tsarists and those socialist parties that were opposed to the Bolsheviks helped him develop a unique, striking rhetorical voice, since he was careful to oppose his opponents both ideologically and stylistically: “Lenin’s polemic itself was a significant shift in the tradition and realm of Russian oratory and Russian journalism. In his analysis of his opponent’s lexicon, Lenin supplies all the typical traits of his own lexicon.” Lenin not only avoided “flowery,” cliché phrases in his work, but also actively strove to introduce “rude,” everyday words and ideas into his writing. This was extremely uncommon at the time, and therefore made him more memorable as a rhetorician: “They appeal to everyday life, and link up with everyone’s daily, ubiquitous speech. Consequently, they extend the most solid, quantitatively and qualitatively mundane associative ties between speaker and listener.” Tynyanov is especially interested in this aspect of Lenin's style: it is connected with his own interest in parody, which he believed to be the artistic device that spurred literary evolution and the development of new forms of art.

Poetic devices in “prosaic” speech: Although the Formalists were sometimes accused by their opponents of being pure aesthetes, who were attempting entirely to separate art from reality, their work on Lenin reveals that this charge was not entirely accurate. After all, Lenin's journalism and speeches were not art, as Eikhenbaum readily admits: “the realm of so-called practical language is extremely broad and varied… As for such forms as oration, despite its seemingly practical character, it is quite like poetic speech. Poetic speech is typified only by a particular attitude to discrete discursive elements and their specific use, especially in poetry.” In this sense, the Lenin issue represents a turning point in Formalist thought. They are applying concepts originally devised for poetic analysis to “prosaic” work, which furthers their project by demonstrating that Formalism's theoretical concepts, like defamiliarization and parodic evolution, need not be restricted to the study of art.

Shklovsky's original interest in analyzing Lenin may have been prompted by the ongoing polemic between the Formalists and more orthodox Marxist critics, like Leon Trotsky. The overall effect of LEF's Lenin issue is that Lenin is presented as deeply pragmatic, more interested in the day-to-day questions of maintaining Bolshevik power than in any larger ideal. Moreover, by presenting Lenin as an ironic, flexible thinker, the Formalists subtly appropriated the Soviet leader for themselves. For as Ilya Kalinin writes, "their engagement with the figure of Lenin, which was only beginning to be canonized but already possessed an exceedingly powerful symbolic significance and social charge, for the sake of providing themselves with additional, political legitimation for their conceptions about the nature of poetic language, led to far-reaching theoretical consequences."

Reactions to LEF's interpretation of Lenin have varied. Within the Soviet Union, it was received positively by the Futurist poet Aleksei Kruchenykh, who went on to write and publish his own analysis of Lenin's language in the following year, heavily citing the LEF critics in his work. The emigre poet Vladislav Khodasevich, conversely, stridently criticized the issue, claiming that it proved Shklovsky and his compatriots to be sycophants to the Communist government. However, although he found the critics' language to be evasive, he admitted that their theoretical observations were justified. The issue has received relatively little mention in the West: Victor Erlich refers to Lenin's rhetoric as an "essentially bleak" topic that did not merit the attention lavished upon it. More recently, Boris Groys mentioned the issue in his book The Total Art of Stalinism, claiming that it served as an example of how the Soviet avant-garde inadvertently helped canonize Lenin after his death. He does not, however, discuss the actual content of the articles.

== See also ==
- Iskusstvo kommuny

== Sources ==
- Victor Osipovich Pertsov (1954), 'Mayakovsky and LEF', News of the Academy of Sciences of the USSR, Department of Literature and Languages, 1954, Volume 8, Issue 4
