= Burliuk =

Burliuk (Ukrainian: Бурлюк) is a surname of Ukrainian origin. Notable people with the surname include:

- David Burliuk (1882–1967), Ukrainian painter
- Nikolai Burliuk (1890–1920), Ukrainian poet, linguist, and artist
- Wladimir Burliuk (1886–1917), Ukrainian painter
