= Productivist =

Productivist may refer to:

- Productivist art
- Belief in productionism
