= Semyon Kirsanov =

Russian writer (1906–1972)

- Семён Кирсанов
- Born: September 5, 1906; Odessa, Russian Empire
- Died: 10 December 1972; Moscow, Russian SFSR, Soviet union
- Resting place: Novodevichy Cemetery
- Education: Odessa University
- Occupations: Poet, journalist
- Awards: Stalin Prize; Order of Lenin; Order of the Red Banner of Labour; Medal "For the Victory over Germany in the Great Patriotic War 1941–1945"

Semyon Isaakovich Kirsanov (Russian: Семён Исаакович Кирсанов; 18 September [O.S. 5 September] 1906 – 10 December 1972) was a Soviet and Russian poet and journalist.

== Biography ==
Still in his teens, Kirsanov was the organizing force in his native Odessa in 1921 behind the Southern Association of Futurists. In 1925, Vladimir Mayakovsky published two of his poems in his Constructivist journal LEF, having met the younger poet on a visit to Odessa. Upon moving to Moscow the same year, Kirsanov began an apprenticeship with Mayakovsky and the poet Nikolai Aseyev and, in the public imagination, inherited his mentor's torch after Mayakovsky's death in 1930. For a more complete biography, see Maxim D. Schrayer's An Anthology of Jewish-Russian Literature, Vol. 1.

In 1925, Kirsanov moved to Moscow. As he wrote in his autobiography, “In Moscow, I was warmly received by the LEF members. I began to publish in the press. I lived poorly, I was starving, I slept on a bench under the Kremlin wall. Mayakovsky arrived from America. Things improved. We wrote advertising poems and propaganda together.” Kirsanov met Nikolai Aseyev. A year later, the State Publishing House published Kirsanov’s first collection of poems, “Sight. Stories in Rhyme,” and a year later, the collection “Experiments.” Fame began to come to Kirsanov. At the invitation of Georgian poets, he lived in Tiflis for four months in 1927.

In 1928, Kirsanov married Klavdia Beskhlebnykh. Klavdia Kirsanova was distinguished by her sociability and aroused sympathy among famous people. Among her closest friends were Aseev's wife Oksana, Asaf Messerer and his sister Sulamith, Anel Sudakevich, Mikhail Koltsov, Alexander Tyshler, Mikhail Botvinnik. Klavdiya helped Kirsanov expand his circle of acquaintances.

In 1928, Kirsanov published the poem "My Name Day" in the publishing house "Zemlya i Fabrika" (even earlier Mayakovsky published it in the magazine "Novy LEF"). According to the memoirs of Lilya Brik, Mayakovsky often sang excerpts from the poem. In the same year, Kirsanov published the poem "Conversation with Dmitry Furmanov" (with the subtitle "From the poem "Dialogues""; this poem was not written). "Conversation with Dmitry Furmanov" was praised for its ideological richness, contrasting it with the poetic trickery of non-propaganda works. In the late 1920s, Kirsanov wrote, and in 1930 published, the dystopian poem "The Last Contemporary" (the book cover was made by Alexander Rodchenko), which was criticized and never published again; in the late 1940s, they even stopped including it in his bibliographies. In the fifth volume of the "Literary Encyclopedia" (1931), Kirsanov was accused of an "ideological breakdown" in that he depicted the future from a petty-bourgeois position.

On April 14, 1930, Mayakovsky committed suicide, which was a personal grief for Kirsanov. Kirsanov considered himself his literary heir; shortly before his death, Mayakovsky began writing a poem about the first five-year plan (“At the Top of My Voice”), and Kirsanov decided to carry out the teacher’s plan.

In 1963, Kirsanov showed signs of incipient throat cancer. He experienced his first painful sensations on airplanes, when he became interested in astronomy and often flew to the Crimea, to the astrophysical observatory. Kirsanov was diagnosed with a tumor in the maxillary sinus. An operation was performed at the Moscow Hospital of Maxillofacial Surgery, the tumor was removed, but the operation damaged the soft palate.

In the summer of 1965, Kirsanov underwent radiation therapy at the Central Clinical Hospital. In November, he went to France with his wife to continue treatment. At the same time, a bilingual anthology of Russian poetry, La poésie russe, compiled by Elsa Triolet, was published in Paris. Kirsanov's poem "The Empty House" was presented in three translations at once - by Triolet herself, Eugène Guilvic, and Léon Robel.

In November 1972, the disease became seriously aggravated and Kirsanov died on December 10, 1972. He was buried at the Novodevichy Cemetery in Moscow.
