= Komfut =

Attempt to create communist-affiliated futurist group in January 1919

Komfut or Kom-Fut (Russian: КомФут) was a short lived attempt to create a futurist group affiliated within the Vyborg branch of the Russian Communist Party (RKP(b)) in January 1919.

The preliminary discussions out of which Komfut arose took place in December 1918. On 1 December Vladimir Mayakovsky and Osip Brik attended a meeting at the Vyborg District Party School, where they criticised Proletkult and instead argued that only futurism sufficiently grasped both proletarian and revolutionary values. Futurist books were distributed and at a second meeting on 7 December, Mayakovsky read some poetry and was well received by the audience. He was followed by a worker called Aleksandr Mushtakov who was an ardent supporter of Futurism. Iskusstvo kommuny (Art of the Commune) had just been launched by Izo-Narkompros, the visual arts department of the new People's Commissariat for Enlightenment. In issue 3 (22 December 1918) Mayakovsky's poem Poet Worker appeared.

It was set up at two meetings of the Vyborg District of RKP(b) on January 13 and 19. Boris Kushner was elected chair.

Although short-lived, the term "komfuter" persisted as a term used for Futurists who espoused communist politics, whether or not they were members of the Communist Party.
