= Boris Eikhenbaum =

Russian historian (1886–1959)

- Борис Эйхенбаум
- Born: 16 October 1886; Voronezh, Russian Empire
- Died: 2 November 1959 (aged 73); Leningrad, Russian SFSR, Soviet Union
- Burial place: Bogoslovskoe Cemetery
- Education: Saint Petersburg State University
- Occupations: Literary critic, historian
- Organization: OPOJAZ
- Movement: Russian formalism
- Relatives: Jacob Eichenbaum (grandfather); Vsevolod Eikhenbahum (brother)

Boris Mikhailovich Eikhenbaum (Russian: Борис Михайлович Эйхенбаум, IPA: [ɨjxʲɪnˈbaʊm]; 16 October 1886 – 2 November 1959) was a Russian and Soviet literary scholar and historian of Russian literature. He is a representative of Russian formalism.

== Biography ==
Eikhenbaum was born in Voronezh, the grandson of Jewish mathematician and poet Jacob Eichenbaum. His childhood and adolescence were spent there. After finishing elementary school in 1905, Eikhenbaum went to Petersburg and enrolled in the Military Medical Academy, soon thereafter in 1906, he enrolled in the biological faculty of the Free High School of P. F. Lesgaft. In parallel he studied music (violin, piano, voice). In 1907 Eikhenbaum left this school and enrolled in the Musical school of E. P. Raprof and the historical-philological faculty of Saint Petersburg State University. In 1909, Eikhenbaum abandoned professional aspirations in music, choosing in favor of philology. In this same year after two years of study in the Slavic-Russian department, Eikhenbaum transferred to the Romance-Germanic department; however, in 1911, he returned to the Slavic-Russian department. In 1912, Eikhenbaum finished his university studies. From 1913 to 1914, Eikhenbaum published in a number of periodicals, and conducted reviews of foreign literature in the newspaper «Русская молва». In 1914, Eikhenbaum began his pedagogical activities, and became a teacher in the school of Y. G. Gurevich.

A key moment in the biography of Eikhenbaum was his involvement with other members of the Society for the Study of Poetic Language (OPOJAZ), which was formed in 1916. In 1918, Eikhenbaum joined OPOJAZ and participated in their research until the middle of the 1920s. Eikhenbaum provided definition and interpretation for the group, with essays such as Theory of the "Formal Method" he helped outline their approach to literature. From 1947 to 1949, Eikhenbaum was victimized by the campaign against "rootless cosmopolitanism", along with Viktor Zhirmunsky, Grigorii Gukovskii, and Mark Azadovsky, but was able to continue his science. Eikhenbaum died at the age of 73 in Leningrad, now St. Petersburg, in 1959.

== Literary works ==
- Pushkin as Poet and the 1825 Revolt (An Attempt at Psychological Investigation) / Пушкин-поэт и бунт 1825 года (Опыт психологического исследования), 1907.
- How Gogol's Overcoat Was Made / Как сделана "Шинель" Гоголя, 1919.
- Melody of Russian Lyric Poetry / Мелодика русского лирического стиха, 1922.
- Young Tolstoy / Молодой Толстой, 1922.
- Anna Akhmatova: An Attempt at Analysis / Анна Ахматова Опыт анализа, 1923.
- Lermontov. A Study in Historical-Literary Evaluation / Лермонтов. Опыт историко-литературной оценки, 1924.
- Leskov and Contemporary Prose / Лесков и современная проза, 1925.
- O. Henry and the Theory of the Short Story / О. Генри и теория новеллы, 1925.
- Literature and Cinema / Литература и кино, 1926.
- Theory of the "Formal Method" / Теория "формального метода", 1925.
- Literary Mores / Литературный быт, 1927.
- Leo Tolstoy: The Fifties / Лев Толстой: пятидесятые годы, 1928.
- Leo Tolstoy: The Sixties / Лев Толстой: шестидесятые годы, 1931.
- Leo Tolstoy: The Seventies / Лев Толстой: семидесятые годы, 1940.
