= Boris Arvatov =

Russian artist and art critic

Boris Ignatievich Arvatov (Russian: Борис Игнатьевич Арватов; 3 June 1896, Vilkaviškis – 14 June 1940) was a Russian and Soviet artist and art critic. He was active in the constructivist movement.

His father was a specialist in customs law. He had two brothers - Yuri Arvatov (1898–1937) and Vadim Arvatov.

Arvatov was involved with the Institute of Artistic Culture (INKhUK) when it was founded in 1920 and was an active theorist and ideologist of the Proletkult. Here he met fellow theorists Osip Brik, Boris Kushner and Nikolai Tarabukin with whom he developed the productivist approach to the role of the 'artist', which they wanted to be orientated towards a more industrial approach aimed at producing socially useful objects.

He was one of the founders of LEF. In 1923, he was diagnosed with psychological disorders linked to his experiences at the front, and interned in a psychiatric clinic. Nevertheless, Arvatov continued to publish assiduously throughout the 1920s, including Art and Production in 1926, his best-known work. His health deteriorated in the 1930s, and he committed suicide in 1940.

== Art and Production ==
Art and Production (Russian: Искусство и производство) was published in Russian in 1926. An amended version translated into German as Kunst und Prodiktion was published in Munich in 1972. Spanish and Italian translations appeared in 1973. An English translation was published in 2017.

In 1940 he committed suicide after spending ten years in a psychiatric sanatorium.
