= Boris Kushner (poet) =

Russian poet, critic and activist (1888–1937)

Boris Anisimovich Kushner (Russian: Борис Анисимович Кушнер; 1888–1937) was a Russian poet, critic and political activist. He was a publicist for the Cubo-Futurists: In 1917 he wrote a manifesto, "Democratic Art", which called for a guarantee for all art movements to have a right to exist and the creation of an environment whereby fresh forces and views would be encouraged so that all works of art would be available to all people.

He worked with Mayakovsky and Osip Brik in IZO-Narkompros. His association with Mayakovsky continued in LEF and Novy LEF. He was involved with OPOJAZ, (the Society for the Study of Poetic Language) and their formalist approach to understanding poetry. He saw the comparison of poetry to music and dance as being understandable, being temporal rather than spatial media. However he distinguished between the tonal sounds of music and the sonorous sounds of poetry, where the sonic values were generally arbitrary. He thus set out to study what he called "sonorous chords" which, he argued, affect the perception of the listener a result of the poem as a whole and which Kushner set out to analyse by creating a grid in which the syllables in each line could be compared with the syllables of every other line.

He was a victim of the purges and was arrested and executed in 1937.
