= Elsa Triolet =

Russian-French writer and translator (1896–1970)

- Эльза Триоле
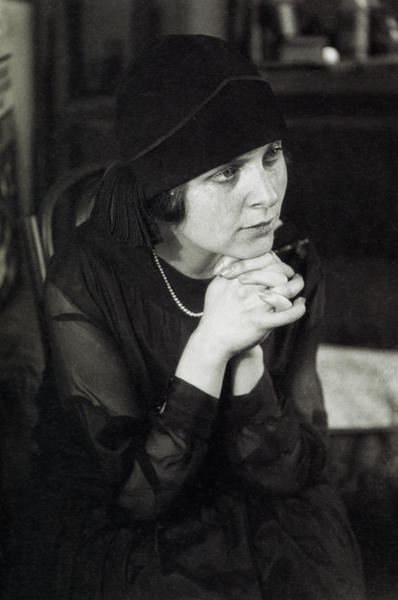
- Triolet in 1925
- Born: Ella Yuryevna Kagan; 24 September [O.S. 12 September] 1896; Moscow, Russia
- Died: 16 June 1970 (aged 73); Moulin de Villeneuve, Saint-Arnoult-en-Yvelines, France
- Writing career
- Citizenship: Russian, then French
- Education: Moscow Institute of Architecture
- Occupations: Writer; translator
- Spouses: André Triolet (m. 1918, divorced) Louis Aragon (m. 1939)
- Relatives: Lilya Brik (sister); Osip Brik (ex-brother-in-law)
- Pen name: Laurent Daniel
- Language: Russian; French
- Notable works: Le premier accroc coûte deux cents francs, 1944
- Notable awards: Prix Goncourt, 1944
- Movement: Russian Futurism

Ella Yuryevna Kagan (Russian: Элла Юрьевна Каган; 12 September 1896– 16 June 1970), known as Elsa Triolet (French: [ɛlsa tʁijɔlɛ]), was a Russian-French writer and translator known for being the first woman to be awarded the Prix Goncourt.

== Biography ==
Ella Yuryevna Kagan was born into a Jewish family of Yuri Alexandrovich Kagan, a lawyer, and Yelena Youlevna Berman, a music teacher, in Moscow. She and her older sister Lilya Brik received excellent educations; they were able to speak fluent German and French and play the piano. Ella graduated from the Moscow Institute of Architecture.

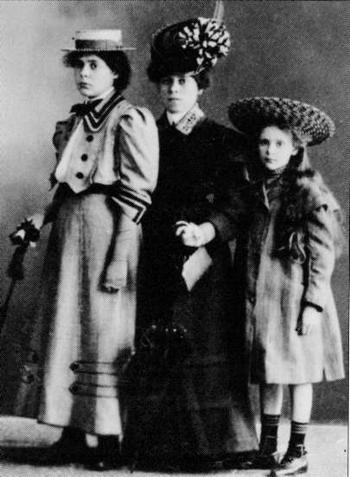
Elsa (right) with her mother, Yelena, and her sister, Lilya, in 1906

Ella soon became associated with the Russian Futurists via Lilya, who was in 1912 married to the art critic Osip Brik; she befriended people of their circle, including Roman Jakobson, then a zaum poet, who became her lifelong friend. Elsa enjoyed poetry, and in 1911 befriended and fell in love with the aspiring futurist poet and graphic artist Vladimir Mayakovsky. When she invited him home, the poet fell madly in love with her sister, marking the start of a series of artistic collaborations involving the two that lasted until the poet's death. Ella was the first to translate Mayakovsky's poetry (as well as volumes of other Russian-language poetry) to French.

In 1918, at the outset of the Russian Civil War, Ella married the French cavalry officer André Triolet, and emigrated to France, where she changed her name to Elsa, but for years admitted in her letters to Lilya to being heartbroken. She later divorced Triolet.

In the early 1920s, Elsa described her visit to Tahiti in her letters to Victor Shklovsky, who subsequently showed them to Maxim Gorky. Gorky suggested that the author should consider a literary career. The 1925 book In Tahiti, written in Russian and published in Leningrad, was based on these letters. She published two further novels in Russian, Wild Strawberry (1926) and Camouflage (1928), both published in Moscow.

In 1928 Elsa met French writer Louis Aragon. They stayed together for 42 years and married in 1939. She influenced Aragon to join the French Communist Party. Triolet and Aragon fought in the French Resistance.

In 1944 Triolet was the first woman to be awarded the Prix Goncourt for her novel Le premier accroc coûte deux cents francs.

She died, aged 73, at the Moulin de Villeneuve, Saint-Arnoult-en-Yvelines, France, of a heart attack.

In 2010, La Poste, the French post office, issued three stamps honoring Triolet.

== Documentary ==
- 1965 : Elsa La Rose directed by Agnès Varda
- 2022 : In the eyes of Elsa Triolet directed by Gregory Monro

== Bibliography ==
- На Таити (In Tahiti, in Russian, 1925)
- Земляничка (Wild Strawberry, in Russian, 1926)
- Защитный цвет (Camouflage, in Russian, 1928)
- Bonsoir Thérèse (Good Evening, Theresa - her first book in French, 1938)
- Maïakovski (1939) translation by N. Semoniff (in Russian – published by Т/О "НЕФОРМАТ" Издат-во Accent Graphics Communications, Montreal, 2012)
- Mille regrets (1942)
- Le Cheval blanc (The White Horse, 1943)
- Les Amants d'Avignon. (The Lovers of Avignon, published pseudonymously as Laurent Daniel for Éditions de Minuit, 1943)
- Qui est cet étranger qui n'est pas d'ici ? ou le mythe de la Baronne Mélanie (Who Is This Stranger Who Isn't from Here? or, The Myth of Baroness Melanie) (1944)
- Le Premier accroc coûte deux cents francs (A Fine of 200 Francs, 1945, Prix Goncourt 1944)
- Personne ne m'aime (Nobody Loves Me, 1946; published in French by Le Temps des Cerises éditeurs, 2014)
- Les Fantômes armés (The Armed Phantoms, 1947; Le Temps des Cerises éditeurs, 2014)
- L'Inspecteur des ruines (The Inspector of Ruins, 1948)
- Le Cheval roux ou les intentions humaines (The Roan Horse, or Humane Intentions) (1953)
- L'Histoire d'Anton Tchekov (The Life of Anton Chekov) (1954)
- Le Rendez-vous des étrangers (1956)
- Le Monument (1957)
- Roses à crédit (1959), the 2010 movie Roses à crédit is based on the story
- Luna-Park (1960)
- Les Manigances (1961)
- L'Âme (1962)
- Le Grand jamais (The Big Never) (1965)
- Écoutez-voir (Listen and See) (1968)
- La Mise en mots (1969)
- Le Rossignol se tait à l'aube (1970)
