= Jacob Eichenbaum =

Galician-Jewish maskil and educator (1796–1861)

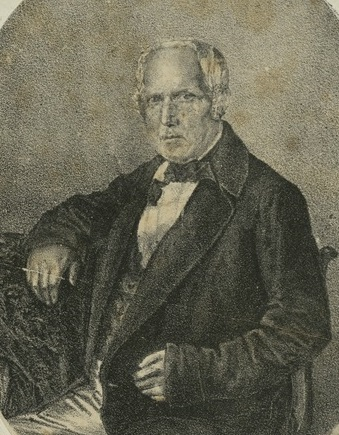
- Born: Jacob Gelber; 12 October 1796; Krystynopil, Kingdom of Galicia and Lodomeria, Habsburg monarchy
- Died: 27 December 1861 (aged 65); Kiev, Kiev Governorate, Russian Empire
- Citizenship: Russian Empire
- Occupations: Teacher, poet
- Relatives: Vsevolod and Boris Eikhenbaum (grandsons)
- Writing career
- Language: Hebrew
- Years active: 1815–1861
- Period: Haskalah
- Subject: Mathematics
- Literary movement: Modern Hebrew poetry

Jacob Moiseyovych Eichenbaum (Yiddish: יעקב בן־משה אייכענבוים, Ukrainian: Я́ків Мойсе́йович Ейхенба́ум; 12 October 1796 – 27 December 1861), born Jacob Gelber, was a Galician Jewish maskil, educator, poet and mathematician.

== Biography ==
Jacob Gelber was born in the Galician city of Krystynopil, on 12 October 1796, in the year following the Third Partition of Poland by the Habsburg monarchy.

By the age of eleven, he was already in his first marriage, but it didn't last long until the divorce, as his father-in-law suspected that he was a secularist. In 1815, when he was eighteen, he remarried, adopted the name "Eichenbaum" and settled in Zamość. There he encountered a progressive Jewish youth circle, and began studying Hebrew, German, philosophy, and (in particular) mathematics. In 1819, he translated Euclid's Elements from German into Hebrew.

He worked as a travelling private tutor, teaching Hebrew subjects and mathematics in wealthy households throughout Ukraine. In 1835, Eichenbaum opened a private school for Jewish children in Odesa, which had become an important educational centre for Ukrainian Jews. In 1836, he published Kol Zimrah, one of the first books of Modern Hebrew poetry published in the Haskalah period. In 1840, he published Ha-Kerav, a poetry book describing a variety of chess moves in verse.

Eichenbaum's educational and literary work attracted the attention of the Russian government, which advanced his position in the Jewish education system of the Russian Empire. In 1844, Eichenbaum was appointed as director of the Bessarabian Jewish school in Chișinău, and in 1850, he was appointed as chief inspector of a Yeshiva in Zhytomyr, a position which he maintained until his death.

During his final years, he continued to publish works of mathematics and poetry. In 1857, he published a Hebrew arithmetic textbook, Ḥokhmat ha-Shi'urim, which he had adapted from a work in the French language. In 1861, he wrote an allegorical poem, Ha-Kosem, which he published in the Hebrew newspaper Ha-Melitz.

On 27 December 1861, Jacob Eichenbaum died in Kiev.

== Sources ==
- Kressel, Getzel (2018). "Eichenbaum (Gelber), Jacob". Encyclopaedia Judaica – via Encyclopedia.com.
- Rosenthal, Herman; Dubnow, Simon (1901–1906). "Eichenbaum, Jacob". Jewish Encyclopedia. Vol. 5. pp. 76–77.
