= Lilya Brik =

Russian author (1891–1978)

- Лиля Брик
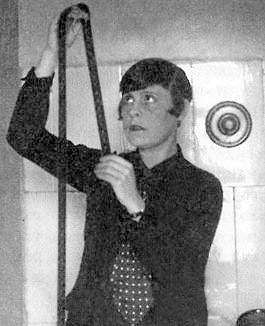
- Brik in 1928
- Born: Lili Yuryevna Kagan; 11 November 1891; Moscow, Russia
- Died: 4 August 1978 (aged 86); Moscow, Soviet Union
- Other names: Л.Ю.; Л.Ю.Б
- Education: Moscow Institute of Architecture
- Occupation: Author
- Spouses: Osip Brik (m. 1912; div. 1930) Vasily Abgarovich Katanyan (m. 1938)
- Partner: Vladimir Mayakovsky (1915–1923)

Lilya Yuryevna Brik (Russian: Лиля Юрьевна Брик; née Lili Yuryevna Kagan; (Note: Russian: Лили Уриевна Каган.) 11 November [O.S. 30 October] 1891 – 4 August 1978) was a Russian author and socialite, connected to many leading figures in the Russian avant-garde between 1914 and 1930. She was the lover and muse of Vladimir Mayakovsky, even while she was married to poet, editor and literary critic Osip Brik (1888–1945). Pablo Neruda called Lilya the "muse of Russian avant-garde". Her name was frequently abbreviated by her contemporaries as "Л.Ю." or "Л.Ю.Б." which are the first letters of the Russian word lyubov (любовь, 'love').

== Early life ==
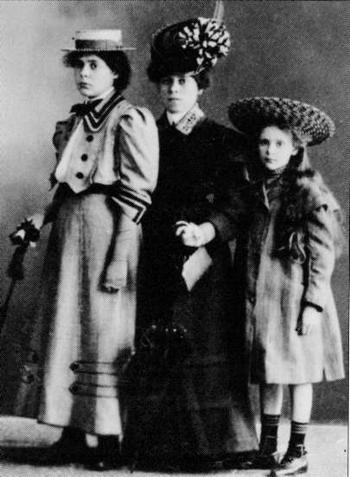
Lilya Brik with her mother and sister Elsa 1906

Lili Yuryevna Kagan (Russian: Лиля Юрьевна Каган) was born on 11 November [O.S. 30 October] 1891 in Moscow, into a wealthy Jewish family. Her father, Yuri Alexandrovich Kagan, was a lawyer and her mother, Yelena Youlevna Berman, was a music teacher. Both she and her sister Ella "Elsa" received excellent education and were able to speak fluent German and French, and to play the piano. Lilya graduated from Moscow Institute of Architecture.

As teenagers, the sisters were famous for their beauty. Their portraits were done by Alexander Rodchenko, Alexander Tyshler, David Shterenberg, David Burlyuk, Fernand Léger and later by Henri Matisse and Marc Chagall. When she was twenty years old, Lilya married poet-futurist and poetry critic Osip Brik whom she had met when she was 14 and he was 17; they were married March 26, 1912. Her sister Elsa married Louis Aragon, a French writer.

The daughter of a prosperous Jewish jurist, the handsome, erotically obsessed, highly cultivated Lili grew up with an overwhelming ambition prevalent among women of the Russian intelligentsia: to be perpetuated in human memory by being the muse of a famous poet. ... The two made a pact to love each other "in the Chernyshevsky manner" – a reference to one of nineteenth-century Russia's most famous radical thinkers, who was an early advocate of "open marriages." Living at the heart of an artistic bohemia and receiving the intelligentsia in the salon of his delectable wife, Osip Brik, true to his promise, calmly accepted his wife's infidelities from the start. In fact, upon hearing his wife confess that she had gone to bed with the famous young poet Vladimir Mayakovsky, Brik exclaimed "How could you refuse anything to that man?" ... In 1918, when Mayakovsky and the Briks became inseparable, he simply moved in with them. Throughout the rest of his life, he made his home at a succession of flats that the Briks occupied.

Mayakovsky's sexual relationship with Lili lasted from 1917 to 1923, and afterwards he continued to have a close friendship with the couple: "For the rest of his life, Osip Brik, Lilya's husband, remained the poet's most trusted adviser, his most fervent proselytizer, and also a co-founder with him of the most dynamic avant-garde journal of the early Soviet era, Left Front of Art."

== With Mayakovsky ==
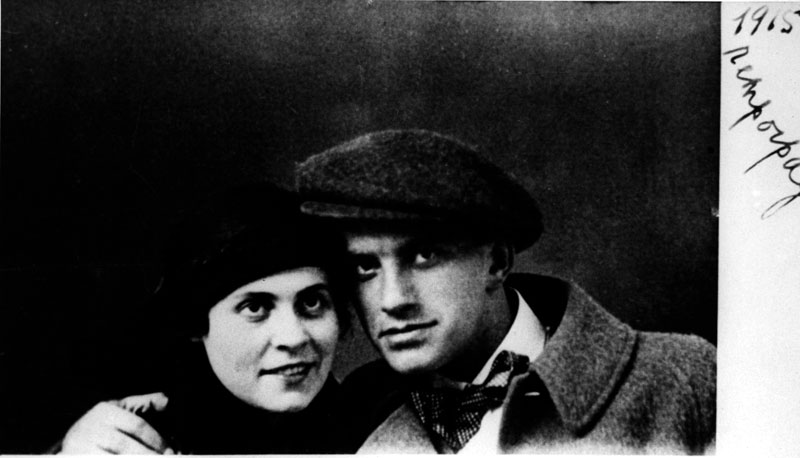
Vladimir Mayakovsky and Lilya Brik

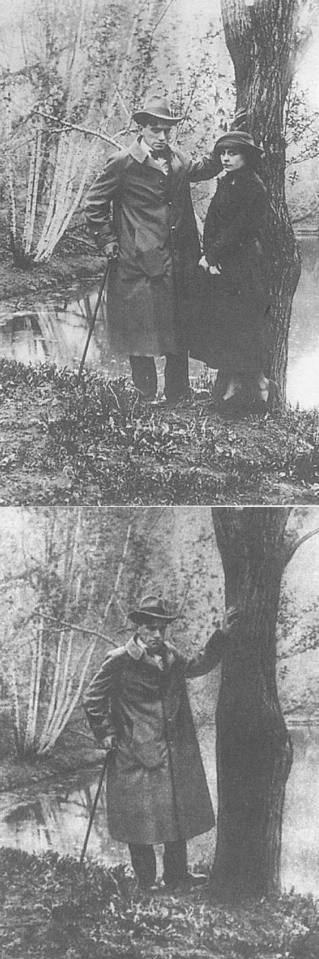
A 1918 photo that appeared retouched in official Soviet publications in the 1960s

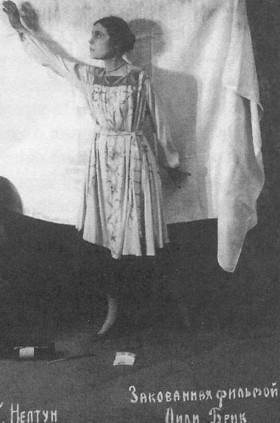
Lilya Brik in the movie Chained by the Film, 1918

In 1915, Lilya's sister Elsa befriended aspiring futurist poet and graphic artist Vladimir Mayakovsky and invited him home, but he fell in love with Lilya. Despite the calamities of World War I, Russian Civil War and throughout the 1920s, their love affair caught and stayed in public attention, possibly because she did not divorce her husband.

After June 1915, Mayakovsky's lyrical poetry was almost exclusively devoted to Lilya (with notable exception of late 1920s to Tatyana Yakovleva). He frequently explicitly dedicated his poems or referred in them to Lilya by name, for example in his "Облако в штанах" ("A Cloud in Trousers", 1915), "Флейта-позвоночник" ("The Backbone Flute", 1916), "Про это" ("About This", 1922), "Лилечка! Вместо письма" ("Lilechka! Instead of a Letter").

In 1918, Mayakovsky wrote the scenario for the movie "Закованная фильмой" (Chained by the Film), in which he and Lilya starred. The movie Neptune – produced by a private movie company – has been lost, with the exception of a few trial shots. Gianni Toti used them in his 1980s movie.

In 1926, after visiting Jewish kolkhozes in Crimea, she produced a documentary, "Еврей и земля" (The Jew and the Land), about Jewish communal farming in the USSR, with the script co-written by Mayakovsky and Victor Shklovsky. In 1928–1929, Lilya turned to directing a half-fiction-half-documentary motion picture "Стеклянный глаз" (The Glass Eye), a parody on "bourgeois cinematography".

Some authors consider that his passion for Lilya was one of the motives that drove Mayakovsky to suicide in 1930 at his Moscow apartment immediately after his breakup with Veronika Polonskaya. Lilya, who at the time was in Berlin, denied this and wrote that earlier she saved him twice from committing suicide.

== After Mayakovsky's death ==
Later in 1930, after divorcing Osip earlier that year, she married Soviet General Vitaly Primakov. Primakov was arrested in 1936 and executed in 1937 in relation to the Case of Trotskyist Anti-Soviet Military Organization, a part of the Moscow Trials. The charges were dropped and he was rehabilitated posthumously in 1957.

In her 1935 letter to Joseph Stalin, Lilya Brik complained that Mayakovsky's poetic heritage was getting neglected. Stalin made a famous remark to Nikolai Yezhov:

"Comrade Yezhov, please take charge of Brik's letter. Mayakovsky is still the best and the most talented poet of our Soviet epoch. Indifference to his cultural heritage is a crime. Brik's complaints are, in my opinion, justified..."

In 1938, she married writer Vasily Abgarovich Katanyan and they spent forty years together.

Lilya Brik committed suicide at the age of 86 when she was terminally ill. She left sculptures and writings. Recently published letters between the sisters in the course of more than five decades (except six years of World War II) reveal insights into life and cultural exchange across the Iron Curtain.

== NKVD agent ==
Speculations about Lilya's and Osip's involvement with the NKVD and State Political Directorate started during their lifetime. According to the Swedish critic and Mayakovsky's biographer Bengt Jangfeldt, Boris Pasternak once told Roman Jakobson that Lilya Brik "frightened" him by saying that her guests would start supper "right after Osya returns from Cheka", and that he later called their apartment "Moscow police department". There's also a well-known story how someone – supposedly Sergei Yesenin – wrote a joke poem on Briks' doors with chalk that read "You think that Brik lives here, a language specialist? A fink lives here and a сhekist". Anna Akhmatova also called the house of Briks "a saloon where writers met with chekists" according to Lydia Chukovskaya.

In her memoirs the artist Elizaveta Lavinskaya, a friend of Briks and Mayakovsky, mentions that at some point new persons started visiting the LEF meetings, including Yakov Agranov, Zakhar Volovich and some other people later identified as high-ranking NKVD officers. A number of people also speculated about the sexual relationships between Lylia and Agranov, including the Soviet ballet dancer Maya Plisetskaya in her book. However, film director Vasili Katanyan, the son of Lylia's third husband Vasily Katanyan, said Brik personally denied those "fantasies" that "started circulating after Agranov's execution".

In 1990, when closed archives became available, an investigative journalist Valentin Skoryatin published an article in The Journalist magazine No. 5 titled Who, me, shot myself? You don't say! where he talked about the mysterious death of Mayakovsky and the inheritance Lilya received after he died. He also made public the NKVD serial numbers of both Osip and Lilya Brik (No. 24541 and No. 15073 respectively). Osip received his ID of the 7th secret department in 1920, while his wife was granted it in 1922. The article was later published as part of the book The Mystery of Vladimir Mayakovsky's Death. New Version of the Tragic Events Based on the Late Archive Findings.

== Influence ==
Although some sought to portray Liliya as a greedy and manipulative femme fatale, those who knew her remembered her as intelligent, generous, and deeply supportive of others. She mentored many aspiring artists and maintained close relationships with leading figures of Russian and international culture, including Sergei Eisenstein, Lev Kuleshov, Boris Pasternak, Vsevolod Meyerhold, Kazimir Malevich, Sergei Paradjanov, Maya Plisetskaya, Rodion Shchedrin, Andrei Voznesensky, Yves St. Laurent and Pablo Picasso.

Lilya Brik saying "Books in all branches of knowledge", 1924 Lengiz Poster by Alexander Rodchenko

Lilya Brik's idiomatically posed portrait appeared on the cover of LEF magazine (Leftist Front of Arts) in the 1920s, a magazine concerning Dada and Constructivist art. The portrait, designed by Alexander Rodchenko, has been reworked into other designs, including as cover art for Franz Ferdinand (album You Could Have It So Much Better, 2004), Beyoncé and Robyn.

== Works ==
- "Щен" (The Pup)
- "С Маяковским" (With Mayakovsky)
- "Пристрастные рассказы" (Passionate Stories)
- Letters between Lilya and Elsa, 1920s–1970

== See also ==
- Vsevolod Meyerhold State Theatre
