= Russian formalism =

Influential school of literary criticism in Russia

Russian formalism was a school of literary theory in Russia from the 1910s to the 1930s. It includes the work of a number of highly influential Russian and Soviet scholars, such as Viktor Shklovsky, Yuri Tynianov, Vladimir Propp, Boris Eikhenbaum, Roman Jakobson, Boris Tomashevsky, and Grigory Gukovsky, who revolutionised literary criticism between 1914 and the 1930s by establishing the specificity and autonomy of poetic language and literature. Russian formalism exerted a major influence on thinkers like Mikhail Bakhtin and Juri Lotman as well as on structuralism as a whole. The movement's members had a large impact on modern literary criticism as it developed in the structuralist and post-structuralist periods. Under Stalin it became a pejorative term for elitist art.

Russian formalism was a diverse movement, producing no unified doctrine, and no consensus amongst its proponents on a central aim to their endeavours. In fact, "Russian Formalism" describes two distinct movements: the OPOJAZ (Obshchestvo Izucheniia Poeticheskogo Yazyka, Society for the Study of Poetic Language) in St. Petersburg and the Moscow Linguistic Circle. Therefore, it is more precise to refer to the "Russian Formalists," rather than to use the broader and more abstract term of "Formalism."

The term "formalism" was first used by the adversaries of the movement, and as such it conveys a meaning explicitly rejected by the Formalists themselves. In the words of one of the foremost Formalists, Boris Eikhenbaum: "It is difficult to recall who coined this name, but it was not a very felicitous coinage. It might have been convenient as a simplified battle cry but it fails, as an objective term, to delimit the activities of the 'Society for the Study of Poetic Language'." Russian Formalism is the name now given to a mode of criticism which emerged from two different groups, The Moscow Linguistic Circle (1915) and the Opojaz group (1916). Although Russian Formalism is often linked to American New Criticism because of their similar emphasis on close reading, the Russian Formalists regarded themselves as developers of a science of criticism and were more interested in a discovery of systematic methods for the analysis of poetic text.

== Distinctive ideas ==
Russian formalism is distinctive for its emphasis on the functional role of literary devices and its original conception of literary history. Russian Formalists advocated a "scientific" method for studying poetic language, to the exclusion of traditional psychological and cultural-historical approaches. As Erlich points out, "It was intent upon delimiting literary scholarship from contiguous disciplines such as psychology, sociology, intellectual history, and the list theoreticians focused on the 'distinguishing features' of literature, on the artistic devices peculiar to imaginative writing" (The New Princeton Encyclopedia 1101).

Two general principles underlie the Formalist study of literature: first, literature itself, or rather, those of its features that distinguish it from other human activities, must constitute the object of inquiry of literary theory; second, "literary facts" have to be prioritized over the metaphysical commitments of literary criticism, whether philosophical, aesthetic or psychological (Steiner, "Russian Formalism" 16). To achieve these objectives several models were developed.

The formalists agreed on the autonomous nature of poetic language and its specificity as an object of study for literary criticism. Their main endeavor consisted in defining a set of properties specific to poetic language, be it poetry or prose, recognizable by their "artfulness" and consequently analyzing them as such.

== Types ==
=== Mechanistic ===
The OPOJAZ, the Society for the Study of Poetic Language group, headed by Viktor Shklovsky was primarily concerned with the Formal method and focused on technique and device. "Literary works, according to this model, resemble machines: they are the result of an intentional human activity in which a specific skill transforms raw material into a complex mechanism suitable for a particular purpose" (Steiner, "Russian Formalism" 18). This approach strips the literary artifact from its connection with the author, reader, and historical background.

A clear illustration of this may be provided by the main argument of one of Viktor Shklovsky's early texts, "Art as Device" (Iskússtvo kak priyóm, 1916): art is a sum of literary and artistic devices that the artist manipulates to craft his work.

Shklovsky's main objective in "Art as Device" is to dispute the conception of literature and literary criticism common in Russia at that time. Broadly speaking, literature was considered, on the one hand, to be a social or political product, whereby it was then interpreted in the tradition of the great critic Belinsky as an integral part of social and political history. On the other hand, literature was considered to be the personal expression of an author's world vision, expressed by means of images and symbols. In both cases, literature is not considered as such, but evaluated on a broad socio-political or a vague psychologico-impressionistic background. The aim of Shklovsky is therefore to isolate and define something specific to literature or "poetic language": these, as we saw, are the "devices" which make up the "artfulness" of literature.

Formalists do not agree with one another on exactly what a device or "priyom" is, nor how these devices are used or how they are to be analyzed in a given text. The central idea is that more general: poetic language possesses specific properties, which can be analyzed as such.

Some OPOJAZ members argued that poetic language was the major artistic device. Shklovsky insisted that not all artistic texts defamiliarize language, and that some of them achieve defamiliarization (ostranenie) by manipulating composition and narrative.

The Formalist movement attempted to discriminate systematically between art and non-art. Therefore, its notions are organized in terms of polar oppositions. One of the most famous dichotomies introduced by the mechanistic Formalists is a distinction between story and plot, or fabula and "syuzhet". Story, fabula, is a chronological sequence of events, whereas plot, syuzhet, can unfold in non-chronological order. The events can be artistically arranged by means of such devices as repetition, parallelism, gradation, and retardation.

The mechanistic methodology reduced literature to a variation and combination of techniques and devices devoid of a temporal, psychological, or philosophical element. Shklovsky very soon realized that this model had to be expanded to embrace, for example, contemporaneous and diachronic literary traditions (Garson 403).

=== Organic ===
Disappointed by the constraints of the mechanistic method some Russian Formalists adopted the organic model. "They utilized the similarity between organic bodies and literary phenomena in two different ways: as it applied to individual works and to literary genres" (Steiner, "Russian Formalism" 19).

An artefact, like a biological organism, is not an unstructured whole; its parts are hierarchically integrated. Hence the definition of the device has been extended to its function in text. "Since the binary opposition – material vs. device – cannot account for the organic unity of the work, Zhirmunsky augmented it in 1919 with a third term, the teleological concept of style as the unity of devices" (Steiner, "Russian Formalism" 19).

The analogy between biology and literary theory provided the frame of reference for genre studies and genre criticism. "Just as each individual organism shares certain features with other organisms of its type, and species that resemble each other belong to the same genus, the individual work is similar to other works of its form and homologous literary forms belong to the same genre" (Steiner, "Russian Formalism" 19). The most widely known work carried out in this tradition is Vladimir Propp's "Morphology of the Folktale" (1928).

Having shifted the focus of study from an isolated technique to a hierarchically structured whole, the organic Formalists overcame the main shortcoming of the mechanists. Still, both groups failed to account for the literary changes which affect not only devices and their functions but genres as well.

=== Systemic ===
The diachronic dimension was incorporated into the work of the systemic Formalists. The main proponent of the "systemo-functional" model was Yury Tynyanov. "In light of his concept of literary evolution as a struggle among competing elements, the method of parody, 'the dialectic play of devices,' become an important vehicle of change" (Steiner, "Russian Formalism" 21).

Since literature constitutes part of the overall cultural system, the literary dialectic participates in cultural evolution. As such, it interacts with other human activities, for instance, linguistic communication. The communicative domain enriches literature with new constructive principles. In response to these extra-literary factors the self-regulating literary system is compelled to rejuvenate itself constantly. Even though the systemic Formalists incorporated the social dimension into literary theory and acknowledged the analogy between language and literature the figures of author and reader were pushed to the margins of this paradigm.

=== Linguistic ===
The figures of author and reader were likewise downplayed by the linguistic Formalists Lev Jakubinsky and Roman Jakobson. The adherents of this model placed poetic language at the center of their inquiry. As Warner remarks, "Jakobson makes it clear that he rejects completely any notion of emotion as the touchstone of literature. For Jakobson, the emotional qualities of a literary work are secondary to and dependent on purely verbal, linguistic facts" (71).

As Ashima Shrawan explains, "The theoreticians of OPOJAZ distinguished between practical and poetic language . . . . Practical language is used in day-to-day communication to convey information. . . . In poetic language, according to Lev Jakubinsky, 'the practical goal retreats into background and linguistic combinations acquire a value in themselves. When this happens, language becomes de-familiarized and utterances become poetic'" (The Language of Literature and Its Meaning, 68).

Eichenbaum criticised Shklovsky and Jakubinsky for not disengaging poetry from the outside world completely, since they used the emotional connotations of sound as a criterion for word choice. This recourse to psychology threatened the ultimate goal of formalism to investigate literature in isolation.

A definitive example of focus on poetic language is the study of Russian versification by Osip Brik. Apart from the most obvious devices such as rhyme, onomatopoeia, alliteration, and assonance, Brik explores various types of sound repetitions, e.g. the ring (kol'co), the juncture (styk), the fastening (skrep), and the tail-piece (koncovka) ("Zvukovye povtory" (Sound Repetitions); 1917). He ranks phones according to their contribution to the "sound background" (zvukovoj fon) attaching the greatest importance to stressed vowels and the least to reduced vowels. As Mandelker indicates, "his methodological restraint and his conception of an artistic 'unity' wherein no element is superfluous or disengaged, … serves well as an ultimate model for the Formalist approach to versification study" (335).

==== Textual analysis ====
In "A Postscript to the Discussion on Grammar of Poetry," Jakobson redefines poetics as "the linguistic scrutiny of the poetic function within the context of verbal messages in general, and within poetry in particular" (23). He fervently defends linguists' right to contribute to the study of poetry and demonstrates the aptitude of the modern linguistics to the most insightful investigation of a poetic message. The legitimacy of "studies devoted to questions of metrics or strophics, alliterations or rhymes, or to questions of poets' vocabulary" is hence undeniable (23). Linguistic devices that transform a verbal act into poetry range "from the network of distinctive features to the arrangement of the entire text" (Jakobson 23).

Jakobson opposes the view that "an average reader" uninitiated into the science of language is presumably insensitive to verbal distinctions: "Speakers employ a complex system of grammatical relations inherent to their language even though they are not capable of fully abstracting and defining them" (30). A systematic inquiry into the poetic problems of grammar and the grammatical problems of poetry is therefore justifiable; moreover, the linguistic conception of poetics reveals the ties between form and content indiscernible to the literary critic (Jakobson 34).

== Literature definition attempts ==
Roman Jakobson described literature as "organized violence committed on ordinary speech." Literature constitutes a deviation from average speech that intensifies, invigorates, and estranges the mundane speech patterns. In other words, for the Formalists, literature is set apart because it is just that: set apart. The use of devices such as imagery, rhythm, and meter is what separates "Ladies and gentlemen of the jury, exhibit number one is what the seraphs, the misinformed, simple, noble-winged seraphs, envied. Look at this tangle of thorns (Nabokov Lolita 9)", from "the assignment for next week is on page eighty four."

This estrangement serves literature by forcing the reader to think about what might have been an ordinary piece of writing about a common life experience in a more thoughtful way: a piece of writing in a novel versus a piece of writing in a fishing magazine. At the very least, literature should encourage readers to stop and look closer at scenes and happenings they otherwise might have skimmed through uncaring. The reader is not meant to be able to skim through literature. When addressed in a language of estrangement, speech cannot be skimmed through. "In the routines of everyday speech, our perceptions of and responses to reality become stale, blunted, and as the Formalists would say 'automatized'. By forcing us into a dramatic awareness of language, literature refreshes these habitual responses and renders objects more perceptible" (Eagleton 3).

== Political offense ==
One of the sharpest critiques of the Formalist project was Leon Trotsky's Literature and Revolution (1924). Trotsky does not wholly dismiss the Formalist approach, but insists that "the methods of formal analysis are necessary, but insufficient" because they neglect the social world with which the human beings who write and read literature are bound up: "The form of art is, to a certain and very large degree, independent, but the artist who creates this form, and the spectator who is enjoying it, are not empty machines, one for creating form and the other for appreciating it. They are living people, with a crystallized psychology representing a certain unity, even if not entirely harmonious. This psychology is the result of social conditions" (180, 171).

The leaders of the movement began to be politically persecuted in the 1920s, when Stalin came to power, which largely put an end to their inquiries. In the Soviet period under Joseph Stalin, the authorities further developed the term's pejorative associations to cover any art which used complex techniques and forms accessible only to the elite, rather than being simplified for "the people" (as in socialist realism).

== Legacy ==
Russian formalism was not a uniform movement; it comprised diverse theoreticians whose views were shaped through methodological debate that proceeded from the distinction between poetic and practical language to the overarching problem of the historical-literary study. It is mainly with this theoretical focus that the Formalist School is credited even by its adversaries such as Yefimov:

The contribution of our literary scholarship lies in the fact that it has focused sharply on the basic problems of literary criticism and literary study, first of all on the specificity of its object, that it modified our conception of the literary work and broke it down into its component parts, that it opened up new areas of inquiry, vastly enriched our knowledge of literary technology, raised the standards of our literary research and of our theorizing about literature effected, in a sense, a Europeanization of our literary scholarship…. Poetics, once a sphere of unbridled impressionism, became an object of scientific analysis, a concrete problem of literary scholarship ("Formalism V Russkom Literaturovedenii", quoted in Erlich, "Russian Formalism: In Perspective" 225).

The diverging and converging forces of Russian formalism gave rise to the Prague school of structuralism in the mid-1920s and provided a model for the literary wing of French structuralism in the 1960s and 1970s. "And, insofar as the literary-theoretical paradigms which Russian Formalism inaugurated are still with us, it stands not as a historical curiosity but a vital presence in the theoretical discourse of our day" (Steiner, "Russian Formalism" 29).

There is no direct historical relationship between New Criticism and Russian Formalism, each having developed at around the same time (RF: 1910-20s and NC: 1940s-50s) but independently of the other. Despite this, there are several similarities: for example, both movements showed an interest in considering literature on its own terms, instead of focusing on its relationship to political, cultural or historical externalities, a focus on the literary devices and the craft of the author, and a critical focus on poetry.

== See also ==
- Defamiliarization
- Film semiotics
- Formalism (literature)
- Formalist film theory
- OPOJAZ
- Geneva School
- Philosophy in the Soviet Union
- Prague Linguistic Circle

== Bibliography ==
- Any, Carol. "Boris Eikhenbaum in OPOIAZ: Testing the Limits of the Work-Centered Poetics." Slavic Review 49:3 (1990): 409-26.
- Baldick, Chris (2015). "Russian Formalism". The Oxford Dictionary of Literary Terms (Online Version) (4th ed.). Oxford University Press. ISBN 9780191783234.
- Brown, Edward J. "The Formalist Contribution." The Russian Review 33:3 (1974): 243-58.
  - ---. "Roman Osipovich Jakobson 1896-1982: The Unity of his Thought on Verbal Art." The Russian Review 42 (1983): 91-99.
- Eagleton, Terry. Literary Theory: An Introduction. University of Minnesota Press, 1996.
- Erlich, Victor. "Russian Formalism: In Perspective." The Journal of Aesthetics and Art Criticism 13:2 (1954): 215-25.
  - ---. "Russian Formalism." Journal of the History of Ideas 34:4 (1973): 627-38.
  - ---. "Russian Formalism." The New Princeton Encyclopedia of Poetry and Poetics. Ed. Alex Preminger and Terry V. F. Brogan. Princeton, New Jersey: Princeton University Press, 1993. 1101-02.
- Garson, Judith. "Literary History: Russian Formalist Views, 1916-1928." Journal of the History of Ideas 31:3 (1970): 399-412.
- Goldblatt, David; Brown Lee B (eds.). "Aesthetics a Reader in Philosophy of the Arts" 2nd ed. Pearson Education Inc
- Gorman, David. "Bibliography of Russian Formalism in English." Style 26:4 (1992): 554-76.
  - ---. "Supplement to a Bibliography of Russian Formalism in English." Style 29:4 (1995): 562-64.
- Jakobson, Roman. "A Postscript to the Discussion on Grammar of Poetry." Diacritics 10:1 (1980): 21-35.
- Knight, Chris. "Russian Formalist Roots', chapter 10 in Chris Knight, "Decoding Chomsky: Science and revolutionary politics", (paperback edition) London & New Haven: Yale University Press, 2018.
- "Boris Eichenbaum." The Norton Anthology of Literary Theory and Criticism. Ed. Vincent B. Leitch. New York: W. W. Norton & Company, 2001. 1058-87.
- Mandelker, Amy. "Russian Formalism and the Objective Analysis of Sound in Poetry." The Slavic and East European Journal 27:3 (1983): 327-38.
- Rydel, Christine A. "Formalism (Russian Formalists)." Encyclopedia of the Novel. Ed. Paul Schellinger et al. Vol. 1. Chicago; London: Fitzroy Dearborn Publishers, 1998. 422-24. 2 vols.
- Shrawan, Ashima. The Language of Literature and Its Meaning: A Comparative Study of Indian and Western Aesthetics. Cambridge Scholars, 2019. p. 68.
- Steiner, Peter. "Russian Formalism." The Cambridge History of Literary Criticism. Ed. Raman Selden. Vol. 8. Cambridge: Cambridge University Press, 1995. 11-29. 8 vols.
  - ---. Russian Formalism: A Metapoetics. Ithaca: Cornell University Press, 1984.
- Surdulescu, Radu. "Form, Structure and Structurality in Critical Theory." University of Bucharest Press, 2000 (online resource available: ).
- Warner, Nicholas O. "In Search of Literary Science the Russian Formalist Tradition." Pacific Coast Philology 17 (1982): 69-81.
