= Productivism (art) =

20th-century art movement

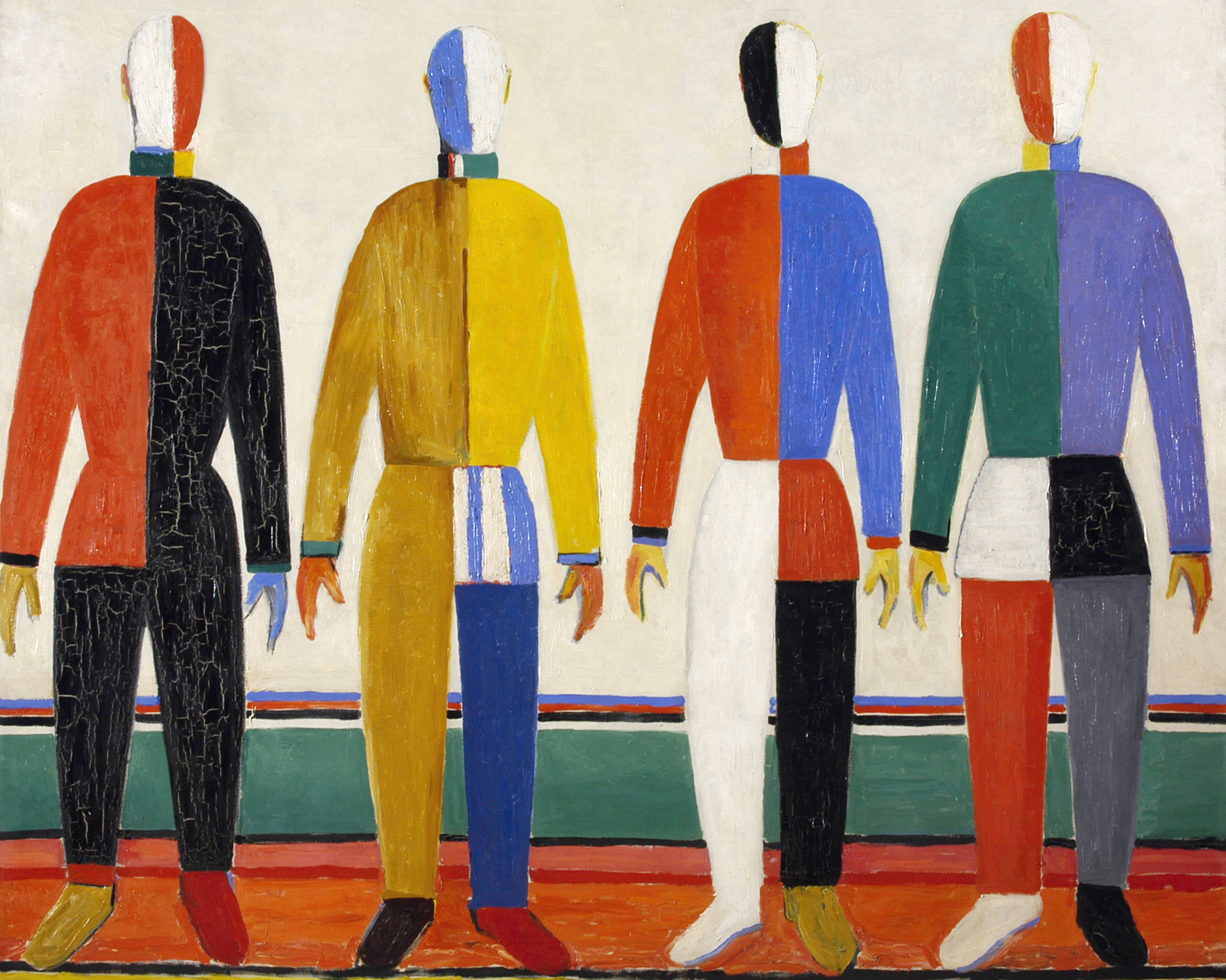
- "The Sportsmen" by Kazimir Malevich, 1929-30.
- Location: Russia
- Major figures: Aleksei Gan, Alexander Rodchenko, Varvara Stepanova
- Influences: Russian folk art, Arts and Crafts movement, Cubism, Futurism, Constructivism
- Influenced: Bauhaus and De Stijl

Productivism is an early twentieth-century art movement that is characterized by its spare geometry, limited color palette, and Cubist and Futurist influences. Aesthetically, it also looks similar to work by Kazimir Malevich and the Suprematists.

But where Constructivism sought to reflect modern industrial society and urban space and Suprematism sought to create "anti-materialist, abstract art that originated from pure feeling," Productivism's goal was to create accessible art in service to the proletariat, with artists functioning more like "engineers ... than easel painters."

"We declare uncompromising war on art!" Aleksei Gan wrote in a 1922 manifesto. Alexander Rodchenko, Varvara Stepanova, Kazimir Malevich, El Lissitzky, Liubov Popova, and others similarly renounced pure art in favor of serving society, a resolution born of extensive discussion and debate at the Moscow-based Institute of Artistic Culture (INKhUK), the Society of Young Artists, journals of the day and organizations like Higher State Artistic and Technical Workshops (VKhUTEMAS) all of whom agreed on the need for a radical break from the "critical and material radicalization of Constructivism."

== Overview ==
The Constructivist movement reconceptualized the aesthetics of art by stripping it to its fundamentals, and rejecting insular precedents. In practice, this meant an emphasis on the fundamentals of geometry (circles, squares, rectangles), a limited palette: black, occasionally yellow — and red (Russian: красный), which was once "used to describe something beautiful, good or honorable." But the Productivists took things several ground-breaking steps further.

By 1923, Rodchenko was arguing that thematic montages replaced it. Meanwhile, artist brothers Georgi and Vladimir Stenberg were cultivating new montage techniques, to optically indicate motion, energy and rhythm, with "unconventional viewing angles, radical foreshortening, and unsettling close-ups." El Lissitzky, for his part, developed a theory of type that could visually mimic sound and gesture so to best organize "the people’s consciousness." As a group, these innovations made the Productivists persuasive, attention-getting and influential, which is why what began as political messaging was later classified as agitprop, and used in commercial advertising. El Lissitzky's insight that "No form of representation is so readily comprehensible to the masses as photography” was proven true by the Soviet graphic art success of posters, and Rodchenko's later work creating "ads for ordinary objects such as beer, pacifiers, cookies, watches, and other consumer products."

Meanwhile, the avant-gardes propagating accessibility "began designing objects and furniture to transform ways of life." They also created "production books" that introduced children to the world of work, and taught them how things were made. Like the Secessionists in Central Europe, they also designed textiles, clothing, ceramics and typography.

By 1926, Boris Arvatov published Art and Production that summarized the principles of productivist art. Only a few years later, Productivism and the movement that spawned it were suppressed by the Soviets. By then, however, its influence had already spread, influencing the "Bauhaus in Germany, De Stijl in Holland and the post-war Zero collectives that sprang up across Europe in the 1950s and 60s."

== Artists ==
(Selection was limited by availability.)

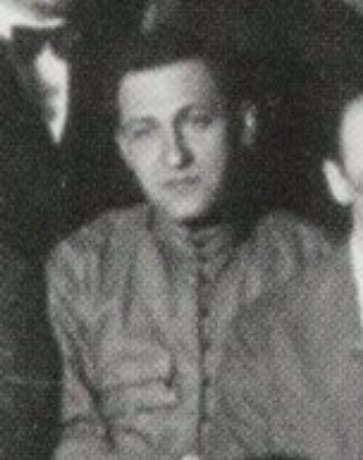
Alexei Gan in 1928.

El Lissitzky in 1914.

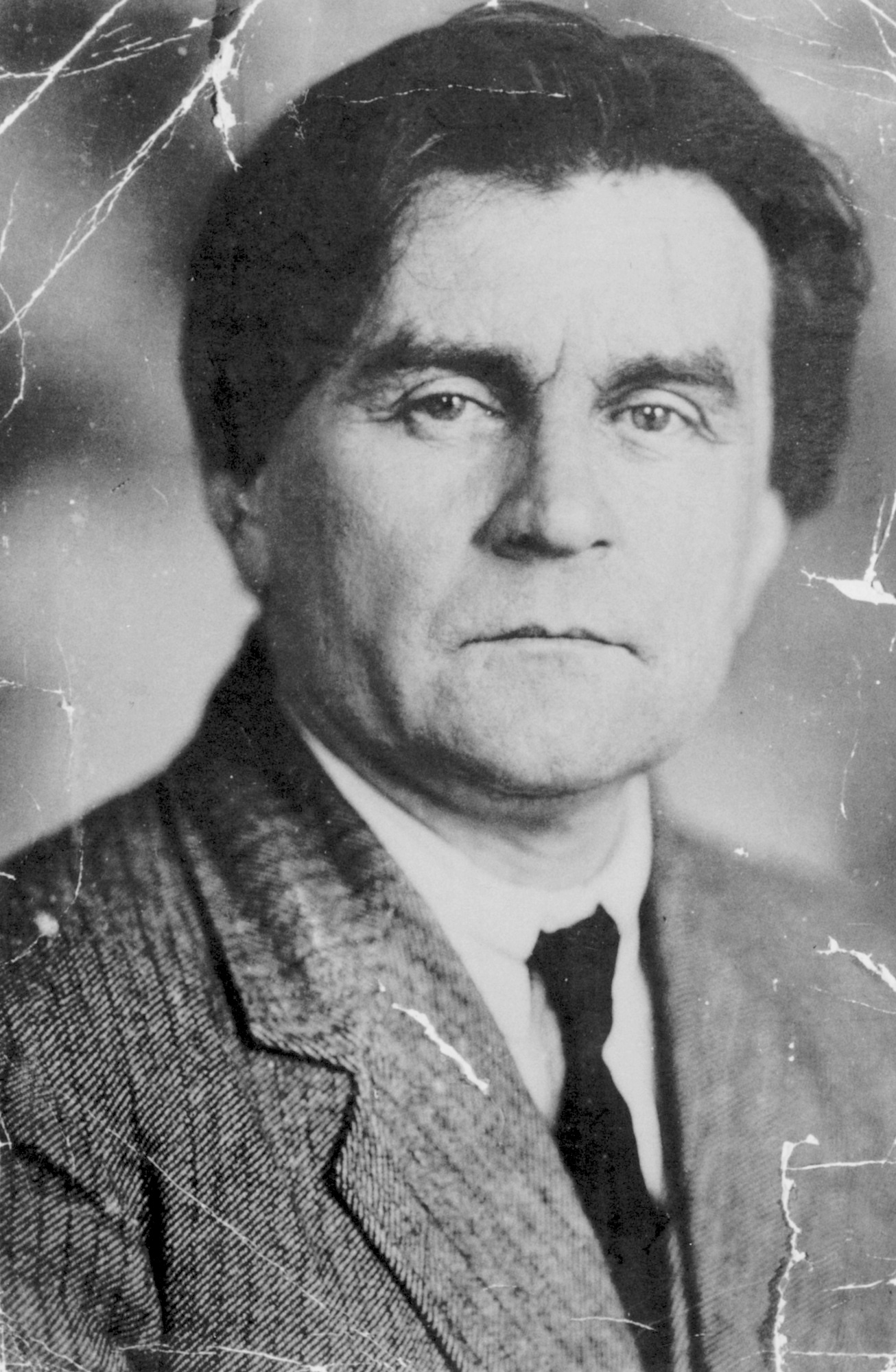
Kazimir Malevich in the late 1920s or early 1930s.

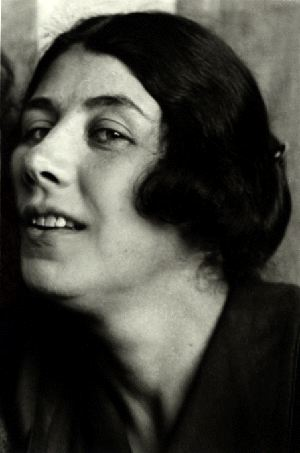
Liubov Popova before 1920.

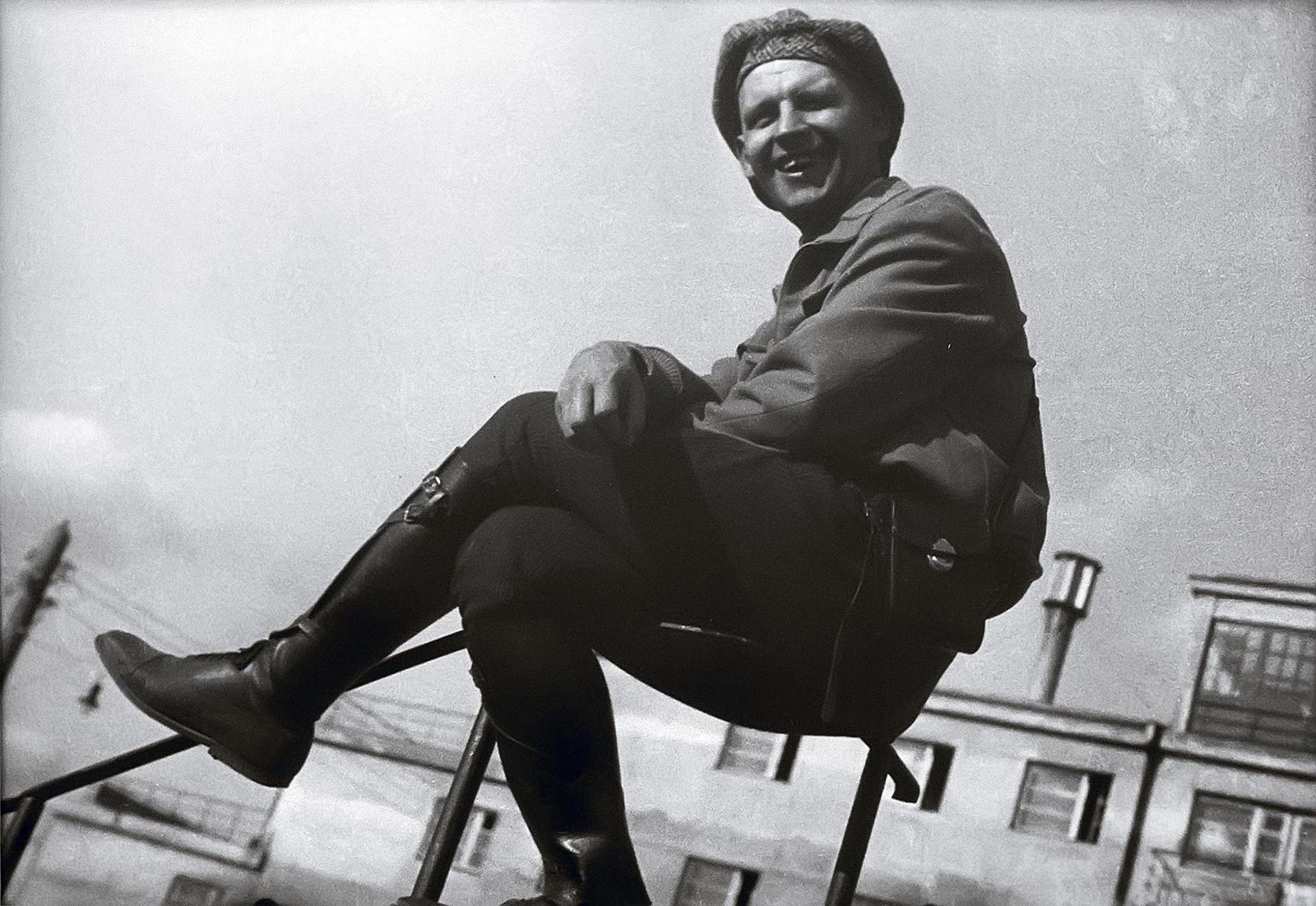
Alexander Rodchenko in 1930.

== Gallery ==
(Selection was limited by availability.)

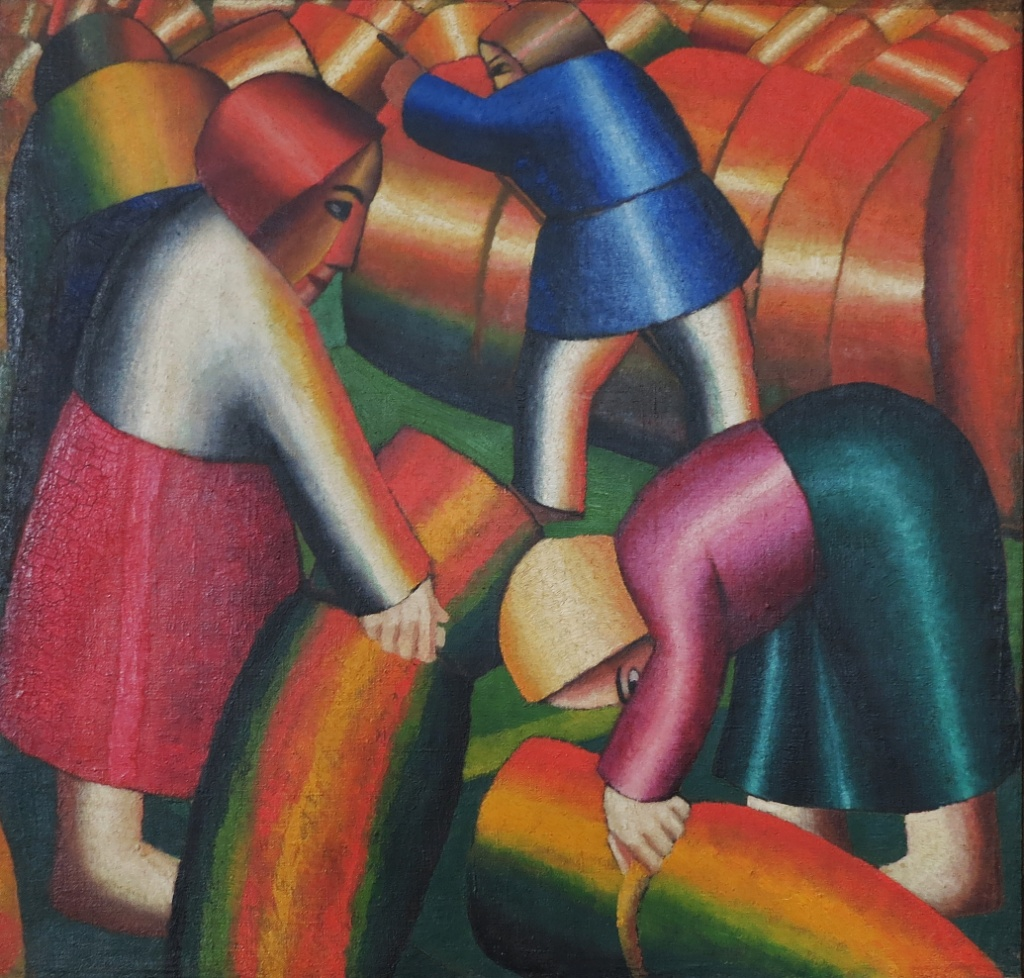
Malevich's "Taking in the Rye," 1911.

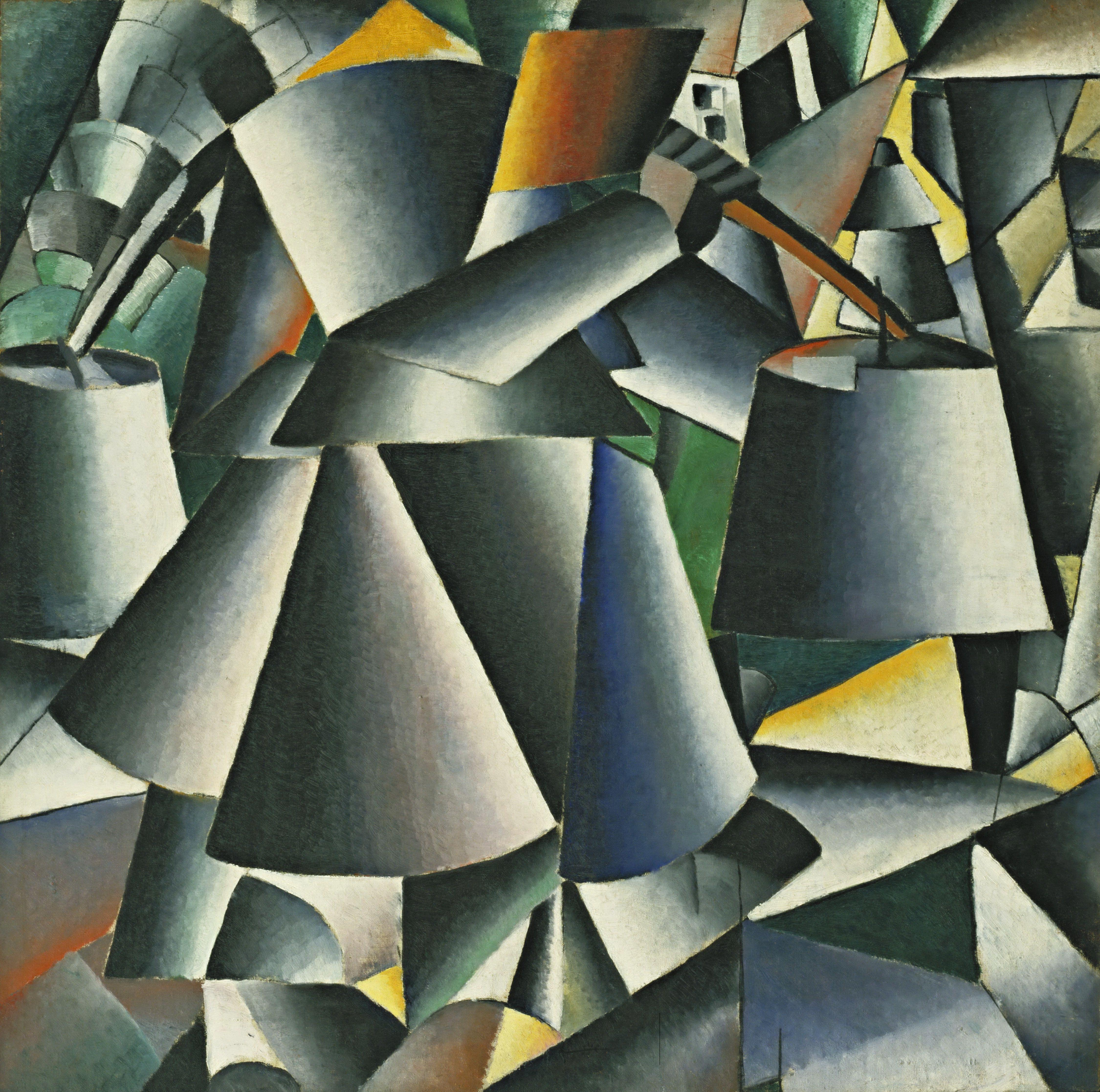
Malevich's "Woman with Pails," 1912.

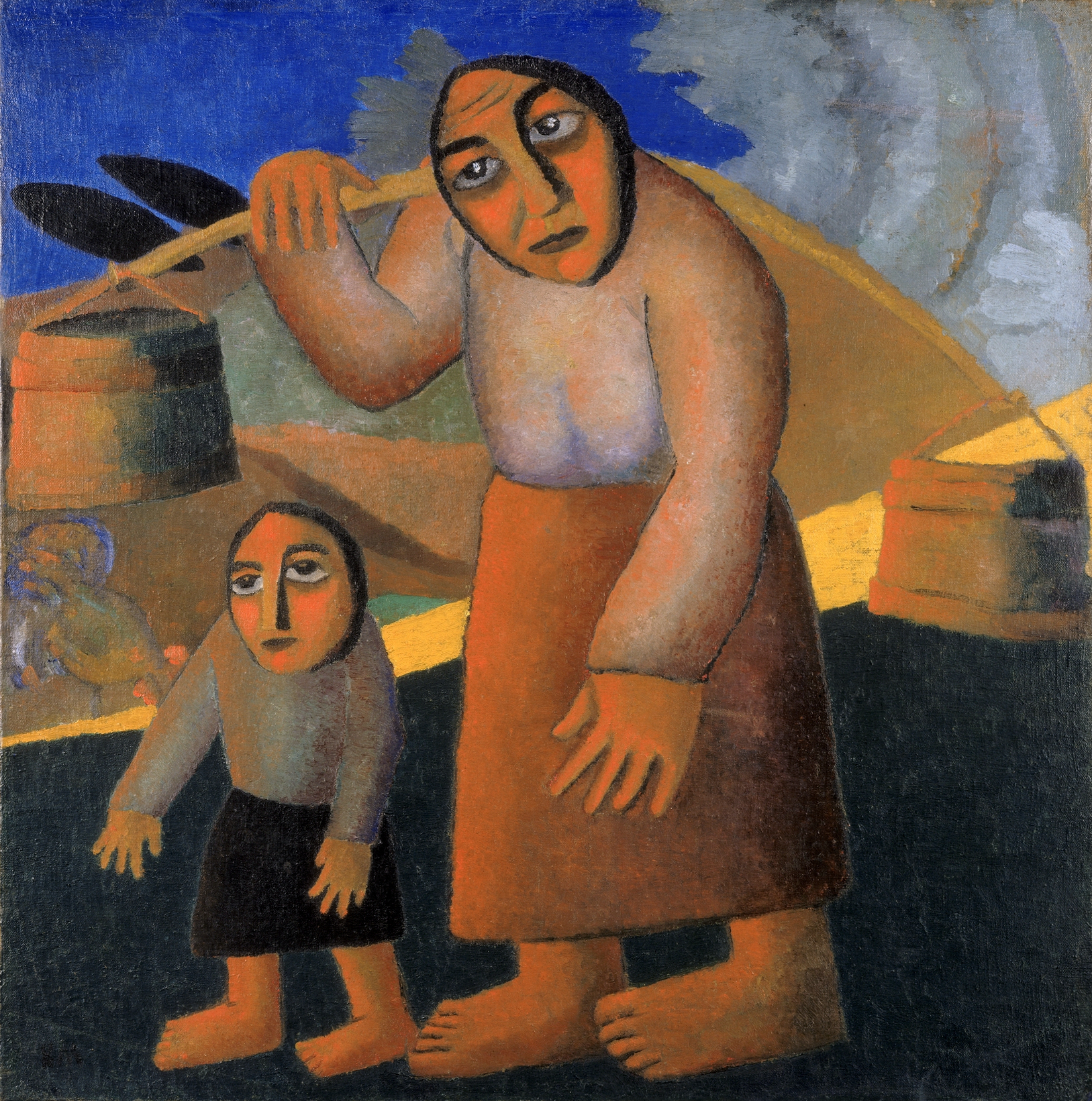
Malevich's "Peasant Woman with Buckets and Child," 1912.

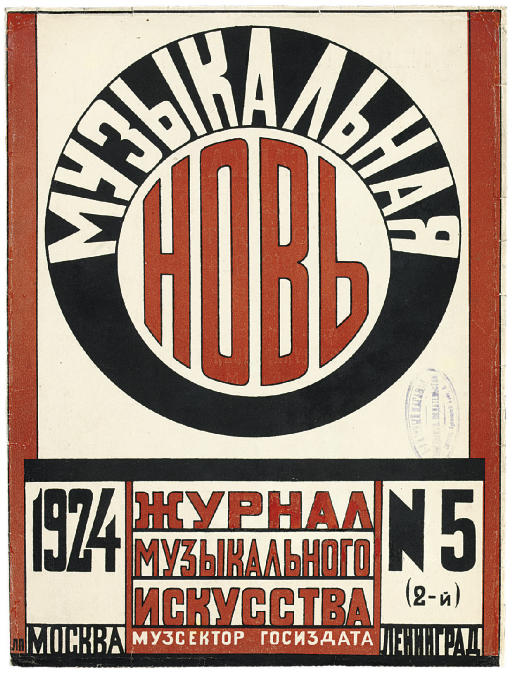
Popova's cover of the magazine "Musical News," 1924.

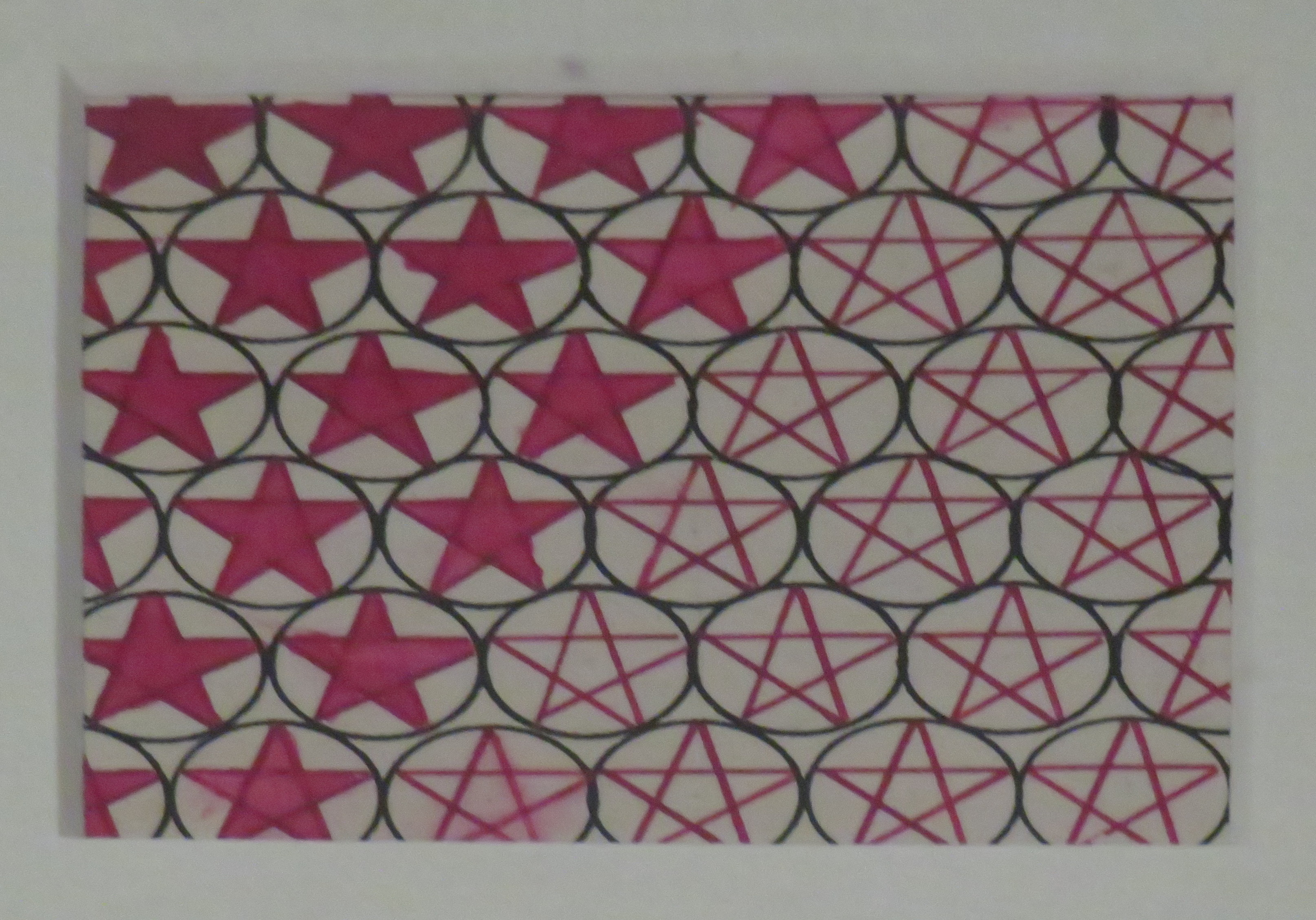
Popova's "Stars in Circles," fabric design, 1923.

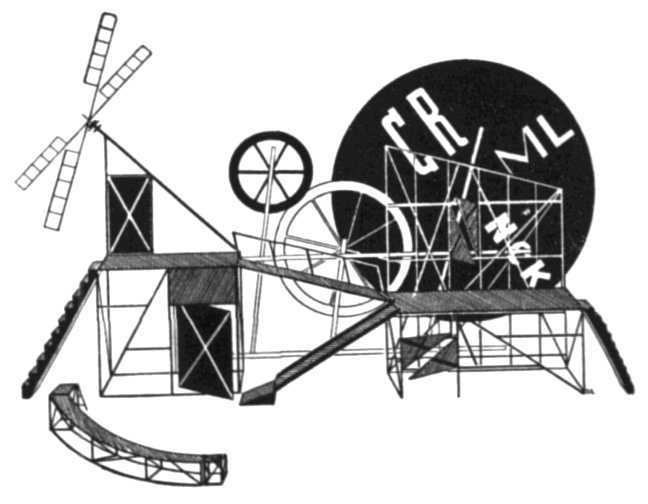
Popova's stage plan for Meyerhold's "The Magnanimous Cuckold," 1922.

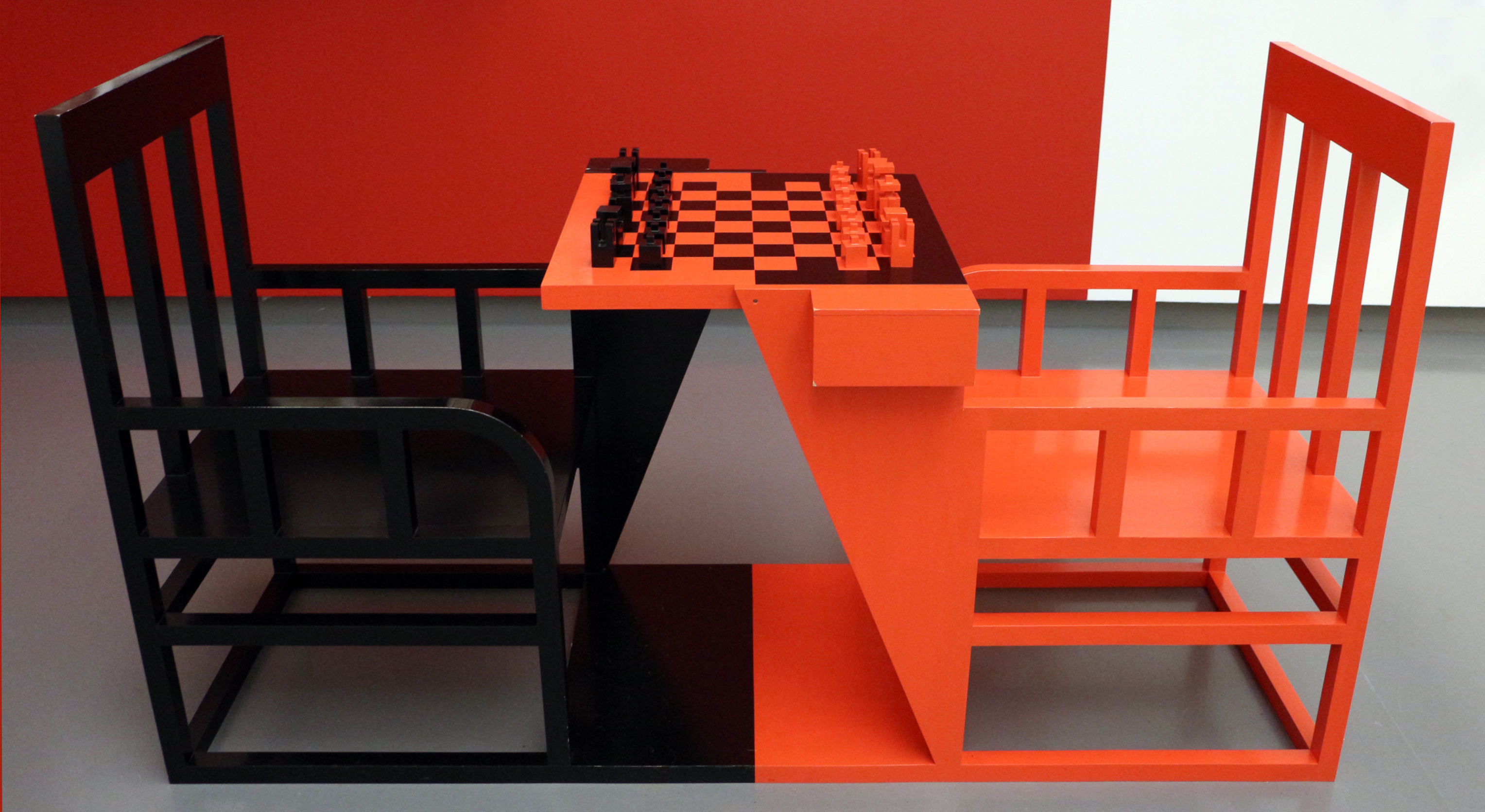
Rodchenko's chess-seat set designed for two, colored to match the competitors, 1925.

Rodchenko's Lilya Brik poster, calling for Russian books in all branches of knowledge, 1924.

== See also ==
- Anti-art
- Vladimir Tatlin

== Bibliography ==
- West, Shearer (1996). The Bullfinch Guide to Art. UK: Bloomsbury Publishing Plc. ISBN 0-8212-2137-X.
