= Nikolai Burliuk =

Russian poet (1890–1920)

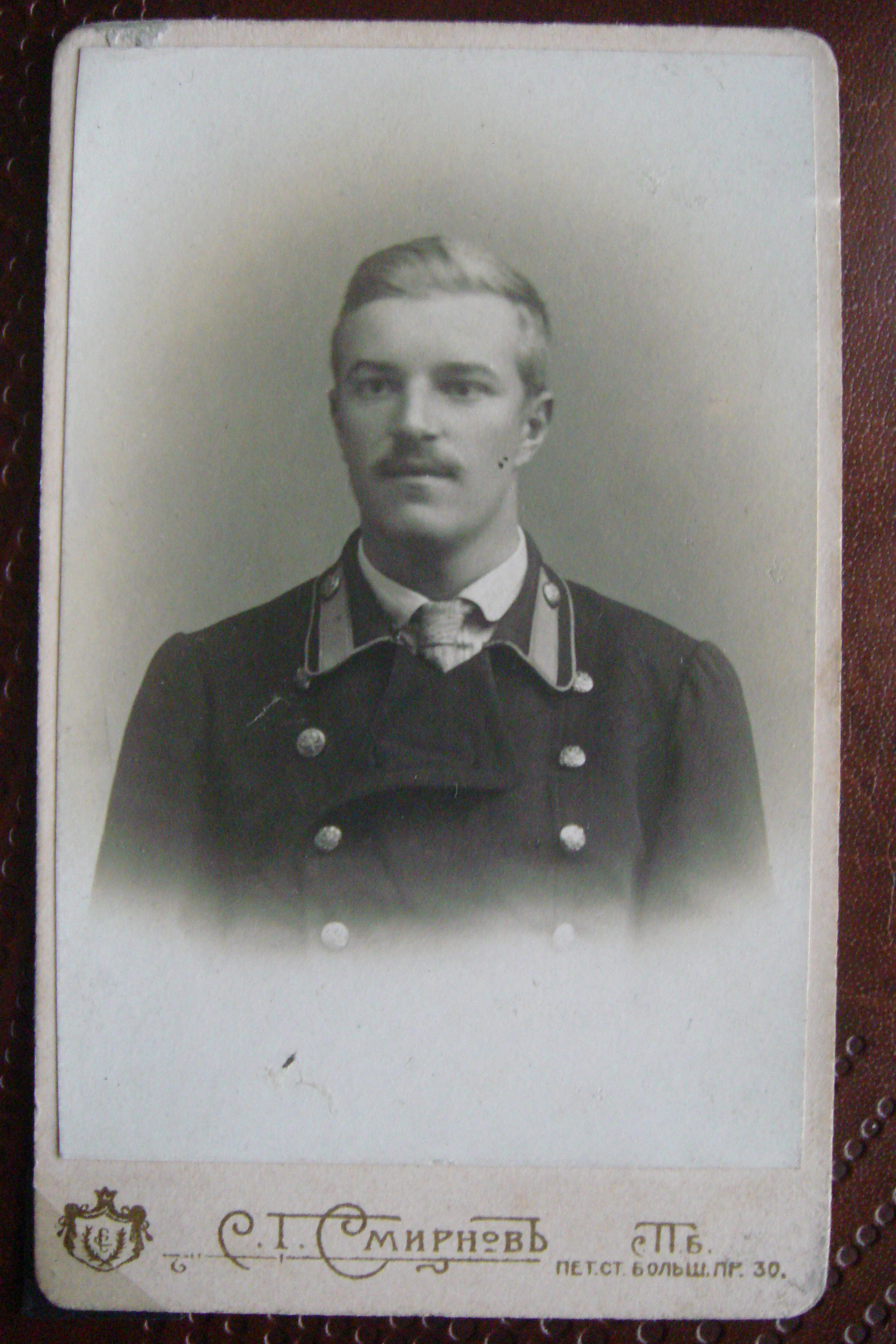
Nikolai Burliuk

Nikolai Davidovich Burliuk (Russian: Николай Давидович Бурлюк; April 22, 1890 – December 27, 1920) was a Russian poet, linguist, and artist associated with the Futurist and Neo-Primitivist movements. He was the younger brother of David and Wladimir Burliuk, prominent leaders in the Russian avant-garde. He is presumed to have been executed while fighting for the White Army in 1920.
