= OPOJAZ =

Former prominent group

OPOJAZ (ОПОЯЗ) (Russian: Общество изучения Поэтического Языка, Obščestvo izučenija POètičeskogo JAZyka, "Society for the Study of Poetic Language") was a prominent group of linguists and literary critics in St. Petersburg founded in 1916 and dissolved by the early 1930s. The group included Viktor Shklovsky, Boris Eikhenbaum, Osip Brik, Boris Kušner and Yury Tynianov. Along with the Moscow linguistic circle it was responsible for the development of Russian formalism and literary semiotics. It was dissolved under political pressure as "formalism" came to be a political term of opprobrium in the Soviet state.

== Bibliography ==
- В. Б. Шкловский (Viktor Shklovsky): Искусство как прием (in Russian: Russian) 1917
- Б. М. Эйхенбаум (Boris Eikhenbaum): Как сделана «Шинель» Гоголя (in Russian: Russian), 1919
- Б. М. Эйхенбаум (Boris Eikhenbaum): Теория «формального метода» (in Russian: Russian), 1925
- О. Вальцель (Oscar Valzel): Проблема формы в поэзии (in Russian: Russian)
- Л. Д. Троцкий (Leon Trotsky): Формальная школа поэзии и марксизм (глава из книги «Литература и революция», 1923) (in Russian: Russian)
