= Nikolai Chuzhak =

Russian Bolshevik journalist (1876–1937)

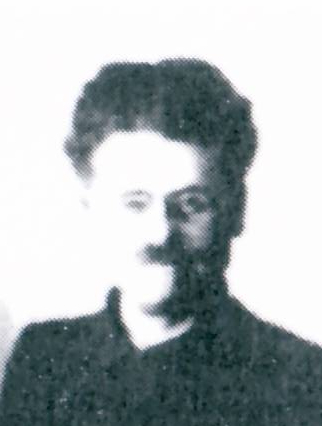
Nikolai Chuzhak in 1922

Nikolai Fedorovich Chuzhak (Russian: Николай Фёдорович Чужак; real surname Nasimovich, Russian: Насимович; 20 August 1876, Nizhny Novgorod – 3 September 1937, St Petersburg) was a Russian Bolshevik journalist, literary critic and art theorist.

Chuzhak was a son of a poor craftsman and violinist who was attracted to the social democratic movement in 1896. In 1904 he went to Geneva and became involved in the production of Proletarii. He returned to Russia and involved himself in revolutionary politics in St Petersburg, attending the RSDLP conference for military and combat organizations held in Tampere in 1906. However he was arrested shortly afterwards and in 1908 he was exiled to Irkutsk. Following the February Revolution of 1917 he joined the unified committee of the RSDLP in Irkutsk and started editing Rabochaia Sibir’. He remained in the Far East of Russia heading the Press department of the regional bureau of the RCP(B), editing Krasnoe znamia (Vladivostok), Dal’nevostochnyi put’ (Chita), and Vlast’ Truda in Irkutsk. He worked underground following Alexander Kolchak's accession to power.

He moved to Moscow in 1922 and joined LEF, helping to draft the group's founding documents. He was associated with Factography and the concept of "art as the creation of life". However he left in 1924 dissatisfied with what he regarded as Mayakovsky's traditional approach to poetry.

Chuzhak spent the last years of his life writing memoirs. From 1933, he received a personal pension assigned by the Council of the Society of Old Bolsheviks. Chuzhak died from cardiosclerosis on September 3, 1937.

Nikolai Chuzhak was father of the chess composer Evgeny Nikolaevich Somov (1910–1944).

== Texts ==
- Toward an Aesthetic of Marxism (1912)
- Siberian Poets and Their Works (1916)
- The Siberian Theme in Poetry (1922)
- Under the Banner of Life-Building (An Attempt to Understand the Art of Today) (1923)
