= Grigory Gukovsky =

Literary critic

Grigory Alexandrovich Gukovsky (Russian: Григо́рий Алекса́ндрович Гуко́вский, IPA: [ɡʊˈkofskʲɪj]; 1 May 1902, in Saint Petersburg – 2 April 1950, in Moscow) was a Russian Formalist literary historian and scholar whose work at the Pushkin House led to the rediscovery of 18th-century Russian literature.

He graduated from the Petrograd University in 1923 and held the chair in Russian literature there. Gukovsky was considered the foremost authority on 18th-century Russian literature. After spending a winter in besieged Leningrad he read lectures in Saratov University until 1948. Upon his return to Leningrad Gukovsky was arrested as a "rootless cosmopolitan". He died of a heart attack in Lefortovo Prison.

Gukovsky's wife Natalia Rykova (1898–1928) was Anna Akhmatova's close friend. She died in childbirth. Their daughter Natalia Dolinina (1928–1979) wrote a number of books for children. Gukovsky's disciples include Juri Lotman.
