= Viktor Zhirmunsky =

Soviet and Russian literary historian and linguist (1891–1971)

Viktor Maksimovich Zhirmunsky (Russian: Ви́ктор Макси́мович Жирму́нский; 2 August 1891 – 31 January 1971; also Wiktor Maximowitsch Schirmunski, Zirmunskij, Schirmunski, Zhirmunskii) was a Soviet and Russian literary historian and linguist.

== Life ==
Born in Saint Petersburg in 1891 to a Jewish family, Zhirmunsky was a professor at universities in Saratov and Leningrad, and a member of the Academy of Sciences of the Soviet Union.

He was a representative of Russian formal studies, though in certain respects he was less inclined to accept formalism as sufficient for all literary analysis. His critique of the ahistorical nature of formalism, in the introduction to his translation of Oskar Walzel′s Die künstlerische Form des Dichtwerkes (1919) helped speed the end of Russian formalism's initial phase, as critics began to accommodate their work to the developing ideology of the Soviet regime.

Though originally trained in German Romanticism, he started to research the epics of the Asian people of the Soviet Union after he was settled in Tashkent following the evacuation of Leningrad. In particular, he studied the aqyn of Kazakh and Kyrgyz culture. This research created a foundation that allowed Yeleazar Meletinsky to make his considerations on the relations between myth and epos.

In April 1948, Zhirmunsky was among the scholars and critics who recanted their supposed "comparativism" and "Veselovskyism" in Andrei Zhdanov′s purge of that year. "Comparativism," or the study of possible borrowing and dissemination of motifs and stories among cultures, was deprecated. In response, Zhirmunsky developed a historical-typological theory, according to which such similarities arose not from historical influence but rather from a similarity of social and cultural institutions.

He died in Leningrad in 1971.

== Works ==
- Skazanie ob Alpamise i bogatirskaya skazka, Moskva 1960
- Narodnij geroicheskiy epos, Moskva 1962

Related works:

- E.M. Meletinskij, Proischoždenie geroičeskogo eposa, Moskva 1963
