= Osip Brik =

Russian, writer, lawyer and literary critic

- Осип Максимович Брик
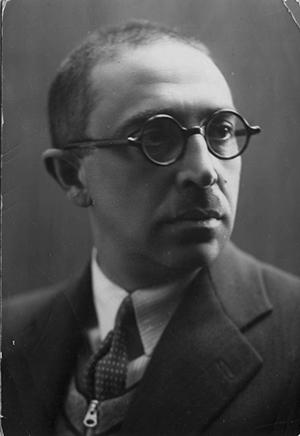
- Osip Brik in 1928
- Born: Osip Meerovich Brik; 28 January 1888; Moscow, Moscow Governorate, Russian Empire
- Died: 22 February 1945 (aged 57); Moscow, Russian SFSR Soviet Union
- Resting place: Novodevichy Cemetery
- Citizenship: Russian Empire (1886–1917); Soviet (1917–1945)
- Education: Imperial Moscow University, Faculty of Law
- Occupations: Writer; literary critic; lawyer
- Spouse: Lilya Brik (née Kagan) (m. 1912; div. 1930)
- Relatives: Elsa Triolet (ex-sister-in-law)
- Writing career
- Language: Russian
- Movements: Russian formalism; Russian Futurism; OPOJAZ

Osip Maksimovich Brik (Russian: Осип Максимович Брик; 28 January [O.S. 16 January] 1888 – 22 February 1945) was a Russian avant garde writer, literary critic and lawyer, known for being an important member of the Russian formalist school, though he also identified himself as one of the Futurists.

== Life and career ==
Brik was born and grew up in Moscow, the son of a wealthy Jewish jeweler. In the university, Brik studied law; his friend Roman Jakobson wrote: "For his doctoral thesis he wanted to write about the sociology and juridical status of prostitutes and would frequent the boulevards. All the prostitutes there knew him, and he always defended them, for free, in all their affairs, in their confrontations with the police and so on." But he soon found himself far more interested in poetry and poetics and devoted all his time to it, becoming one of the founders of OPOJAZ and writing one of the first important formalist studies of sounds in poetry, Zvukovye povtory ("Sound repetitions," 1917).

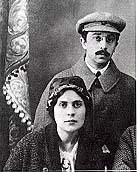
Osip and Lilya Brik

He had a strongly anti-author stance, once going so far as to say that if Pushkin had not written Eugene Onegin, somebody else would have; he wrote that "there are no poets or literary figures, there is poetry and literature." He was also interested in photography and film: "In 1918, Brik was a member of IZO Narkompros (Visual Arts Section of the People's Committee for Education). ... Brik was especially close to Alexander Rodchenko and did much to make his photographic work known." He was also active in films and wrote several screenplays, including one for Potomok Cingis-khana (The Descendant of Genghis Khan) (with Ivan Novokshonov), directed by Vsevolod Pudovkin (1928).

He met his future wife, Lilya Kagan, when he was 17 and she 14; they were married on 26 March 1912. (Her sister Elsa was a notable French writer and married to Louis Aragon)

The daughter of a prosperous Jewish jurist, the handsome, erotically obsessed, highly cultivated Lili grew up with an overwhelming ambition prevalent among women of the Russian intelligentsia: to be perpetuated in human memory by being the muse of a famous poet. ... The two made a pact to love each other "in the Chernyshevsky manner" – a reference to one of nineteenth-century Russia's most famous radical thinkers, who was an early advocate of "open marriages." Living at the heart of an artistic bohemia and receiving the intelligentsia in the salon of his delectable wife, Osip Brik, true to his promise, calmly accepted his wife's infidelities from the start. In fact, upon hearing his wife confess that she had gone to bed with the famous young poet Vladimir Mayakovsky, Brik exclaimed "How could you refuse anything to that man?" ... In 1918, when Mayakovsky and the Briks became inseparable, he simply moved in with them. Throughout the rest of his life, he made his home at a succession of flats that the Briks occupied.

Mayakovsky's sexual relationship with Lili lasted from 1917 to 1923, and afterwards he continued to have a close friendship with the couple: "For the rest of his life, 'Osia' Brik remained the poet's most trusted adviser, his most fervent proselytizer, and also a co-founder with him of the most dynamic avant-garde journal of the early Soviet era, Left Front of Art," or LEF, which was also an official publication for the group with the same name, and a platform for Russian Constructivist art.

Brik was not only a literary modernist, he was strongly left-wing in politics. In December 1918 Brik was involved with Mayakovsky in discussions with the Vyborg District party school of the Russian Communist Party (RKP(b)) to set up a Futurist organisation affiliated to the party. Named Komfut the organisation was formally founded in January 1919, but was swiftly dissolved following the intervention of Anatoly Lunacharsky.

Later, on 8 June 1920, he joined the Cheka. Jakobson wrote of this period:

It was from Bogatyrev, who visited me in Prague in December 1921, that I learned Brik was in the Cheka. And he told me that Pasternak, who often visited the Briks, had said to him: "Still, it's become rather terrifying. You come in, and Lili says: 'Wait a while, we'll have dinner as soon as Osja comes back from the Cheka.'" At the end of 1922 I met the Briks in Berlin. Osja said to me: "Now there's an institution where a man loses his sentimentality," and began relating to me several rather bloody episodes. This was the first time he made a rather repulsive impression on me. Working in the Cheka had ruined him.

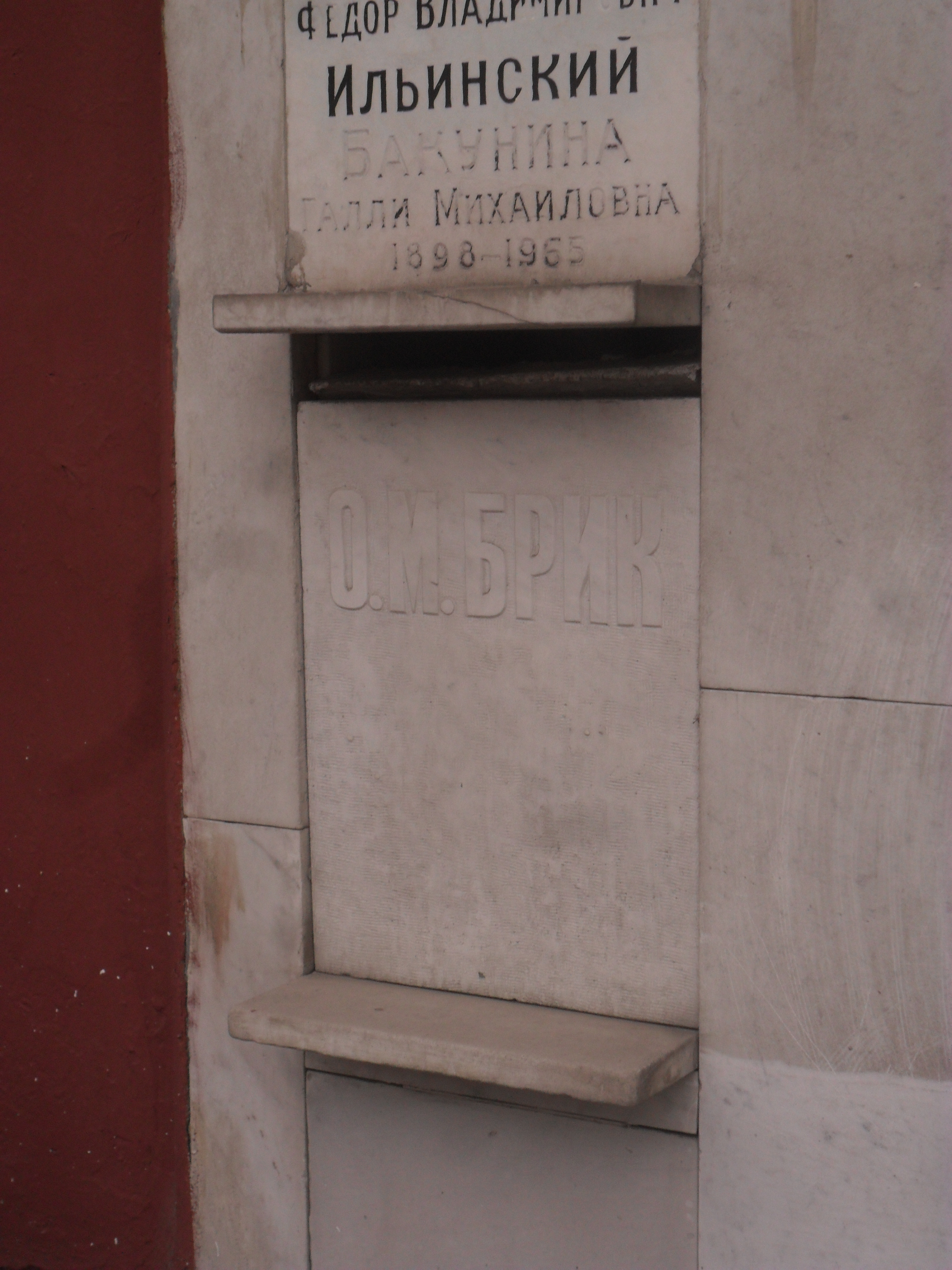
Columbarium plaque of Osip Brik at Novodevichy Cemetery in Moscow.

After Joseph Stalin's rise to power, the Communist regime openly encouraged exclusively socialist realism methods and initiated a campaign to stamp out all culture the Communist Party perceived as dangerous. Most avant garde artists and thinkers suffered persecution, and Brik did not escape this fate. In the 1930s he eked out a living writing articles on Mayakovsky and book reviews; he died in 1945 of a heart attack while climbing the stairs to his Moscow apartment. His works were not republished in Russia until the mid-1990s. Edward J. Brown summed his career up thus: "He wrote little, but his articles on poetic form ... are brilliant formalist analyses of poetic language... and he was probably the most articulate exponent in Lef of the theories of 'social demand' and 'literature of fact.' A man of surpassing intelligence, he was apparently not strong either in performance or in principle."

== Bibliography ==
(in English)

- Two Essays on Poetic Language, Ann Arbor, 1964
