= Membrane structure =

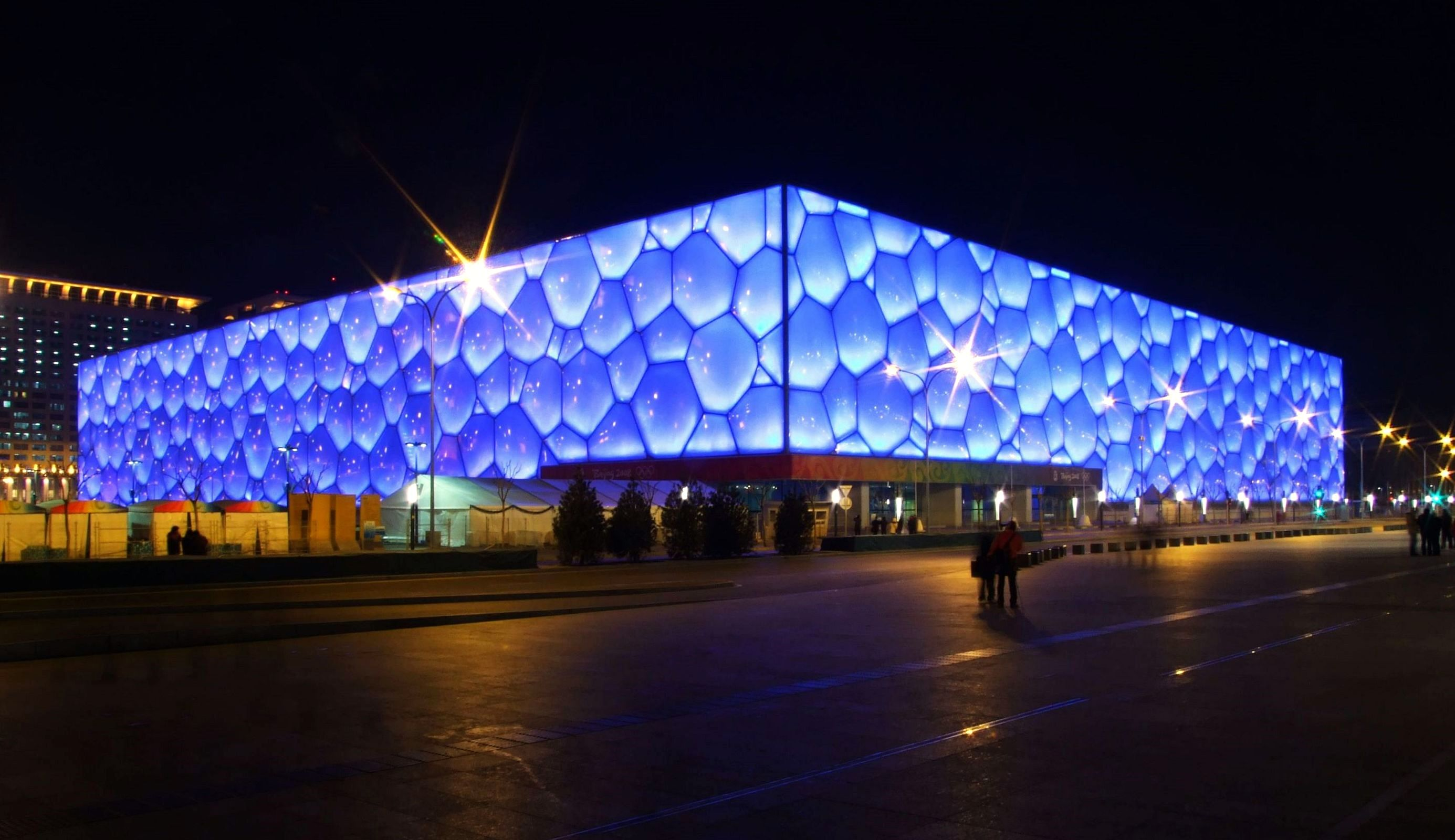
The Water Cube in Beijing

Membrane structures are spatial structures made out of tensioned membranes. The structural use of membranes can be divided into pneumatic structures, tensile membrane structures, and cable domes. In these three kinds of structure, membranes work together with cables, columns and other construction members to find a form.

Membranes are also used as non-structural cladding, as at the Beijing National Stadium where the spaces between the massive steel structural members are infilled with PTFE coated glass fiber fabric and ETFE foil. The other major building on the site, built for the 2008 Summer Olympics, is the Beijing National Aquatics Center, also known as the Water Cube. It is entirely clad in 100,000 square metres of inflated ETFE foil cushions arranged as an apparently random cellular structure.

== Materials ==
The common membranes used in membrane structures include:

- PVC coated polyester fabric
- Translucent Polyethylene fabric
- PVC coated glass fiber fabric
- PTFE coated glass fiber fabric; foils like
- ETFE foil
- PVC foil.

== Gallery ==
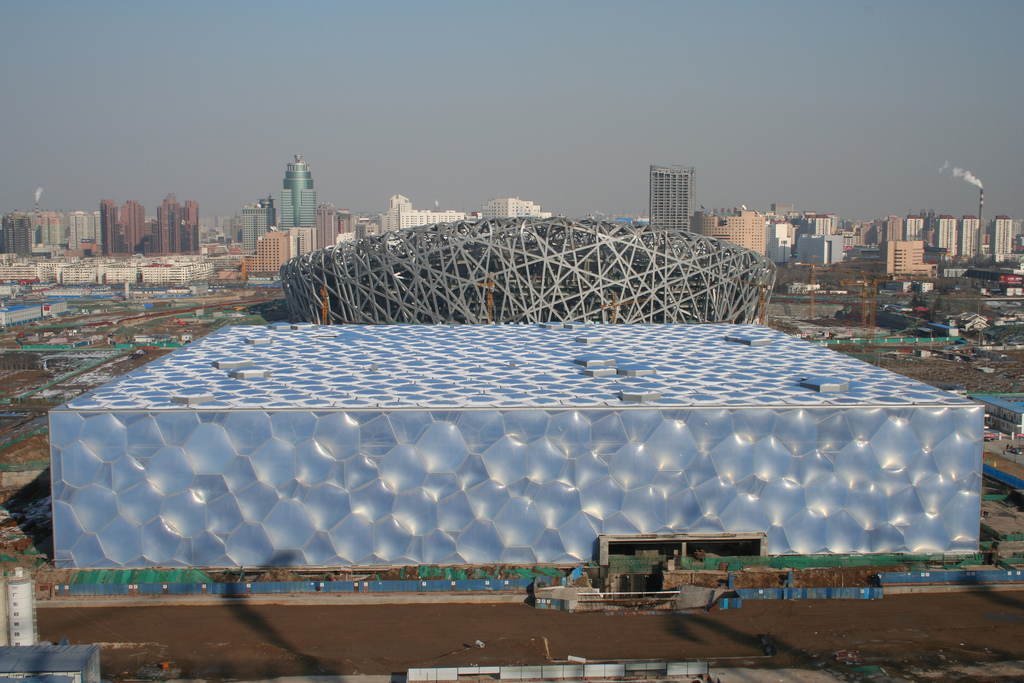
Beijing National Aquatics Center

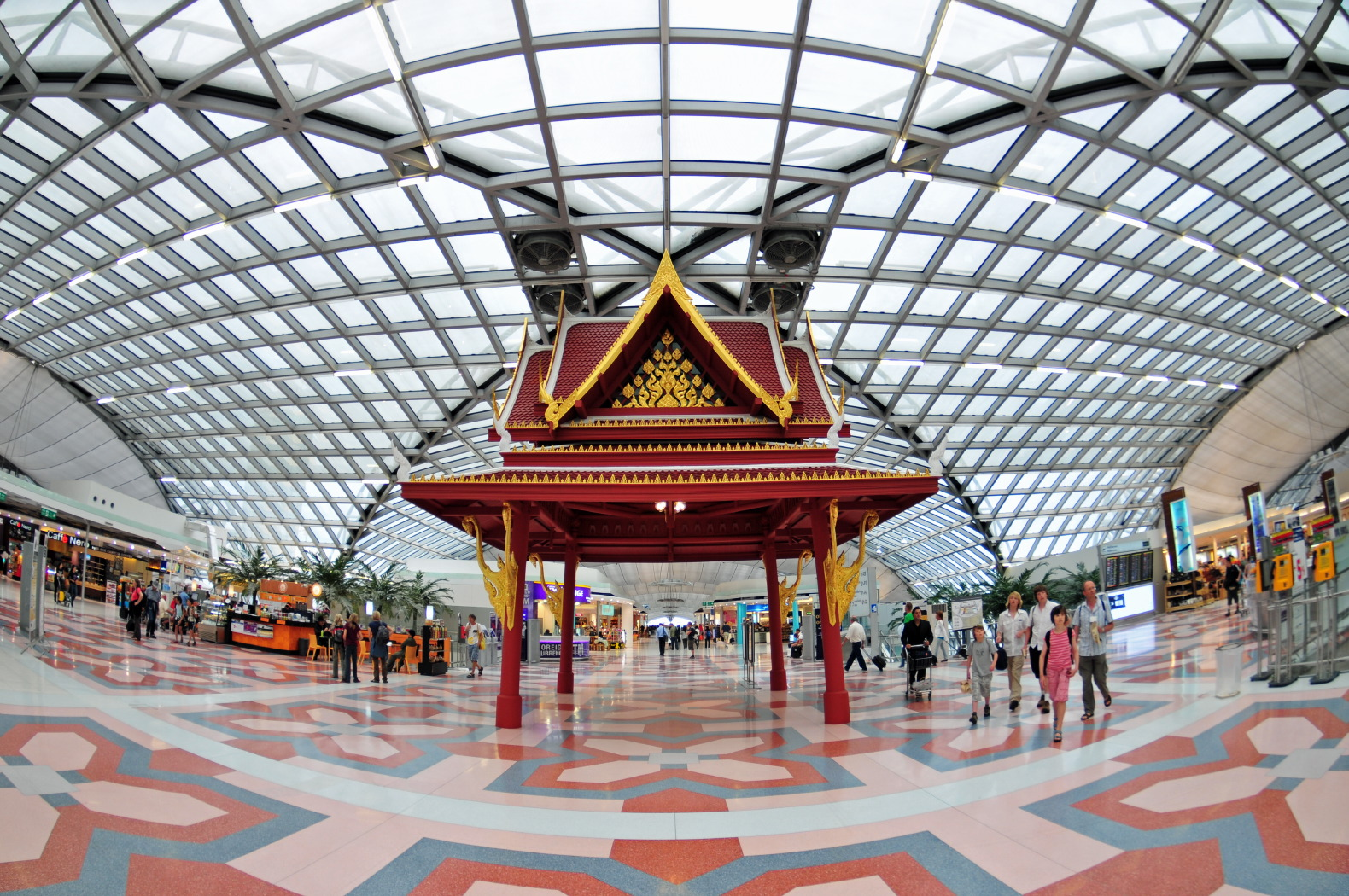
Suvarnabhumi Airport, Thailand

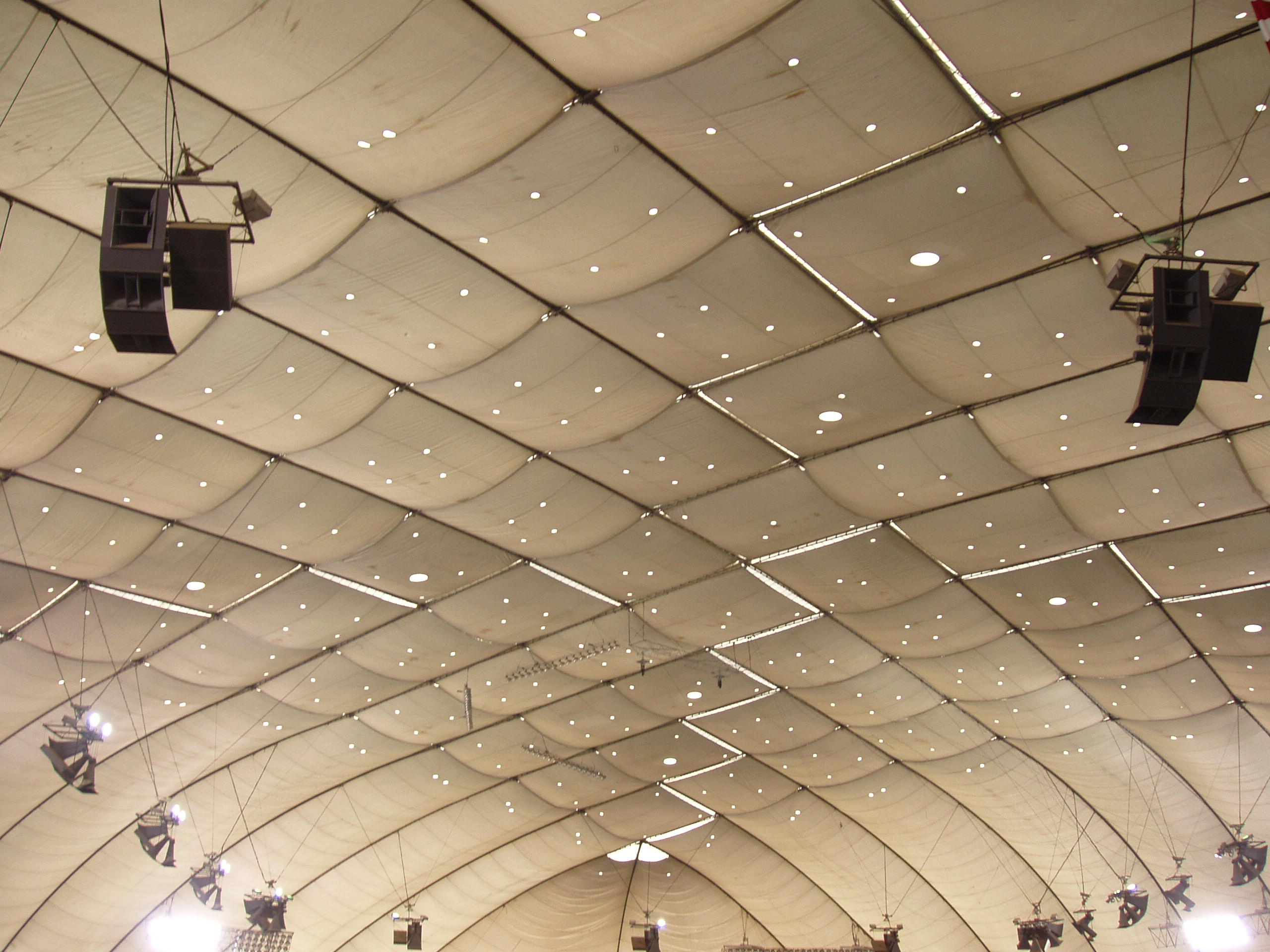
Metrodome, Minnesota

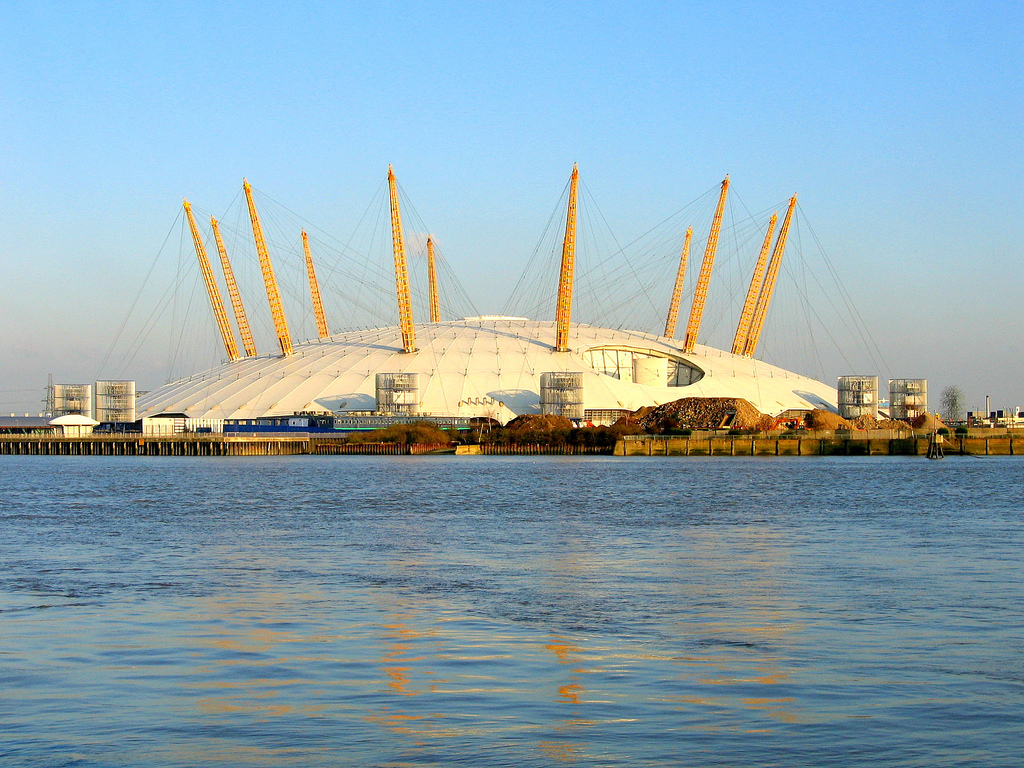
Millennium Dome, London

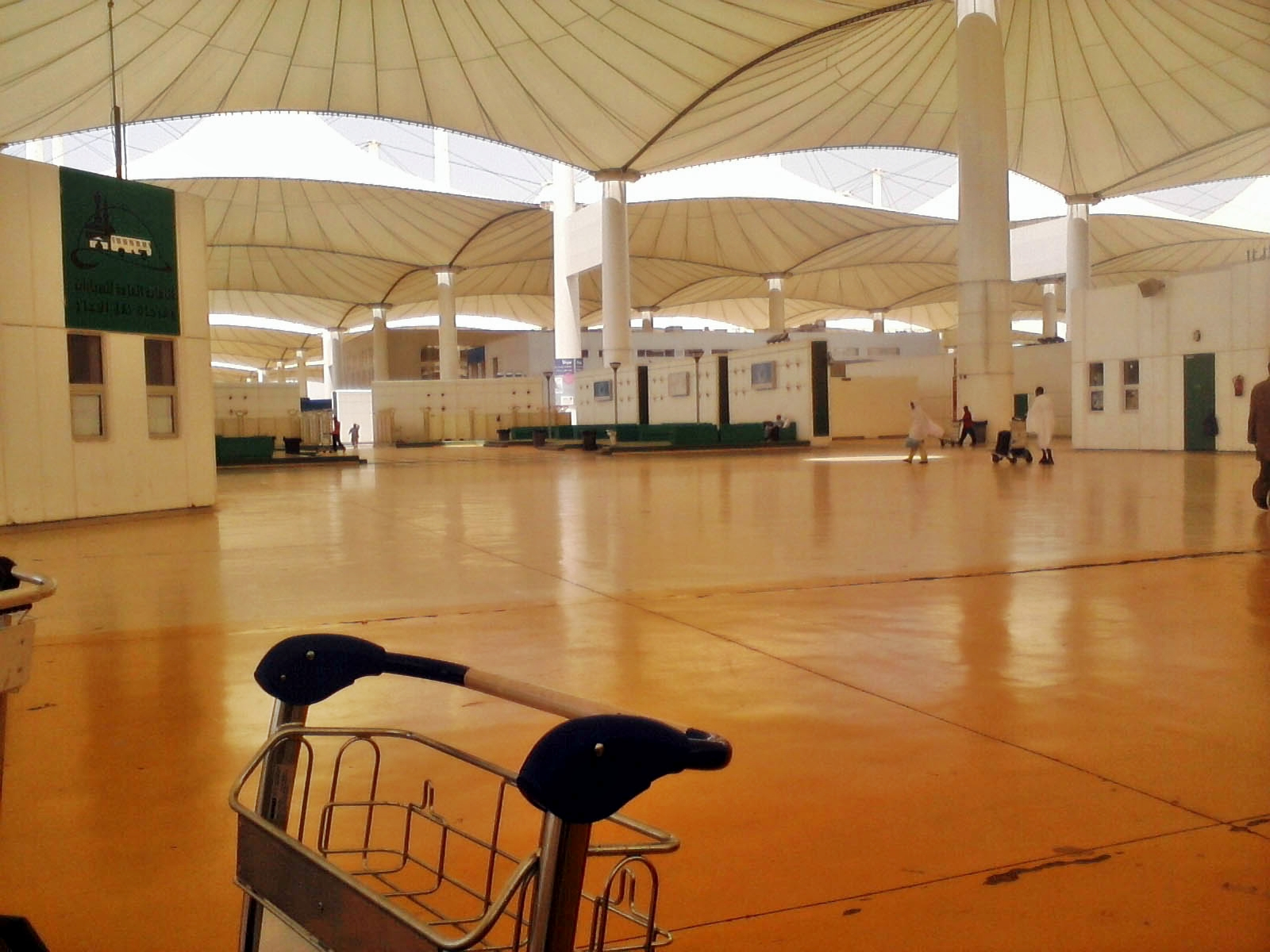
King Abdulaziz International Airport

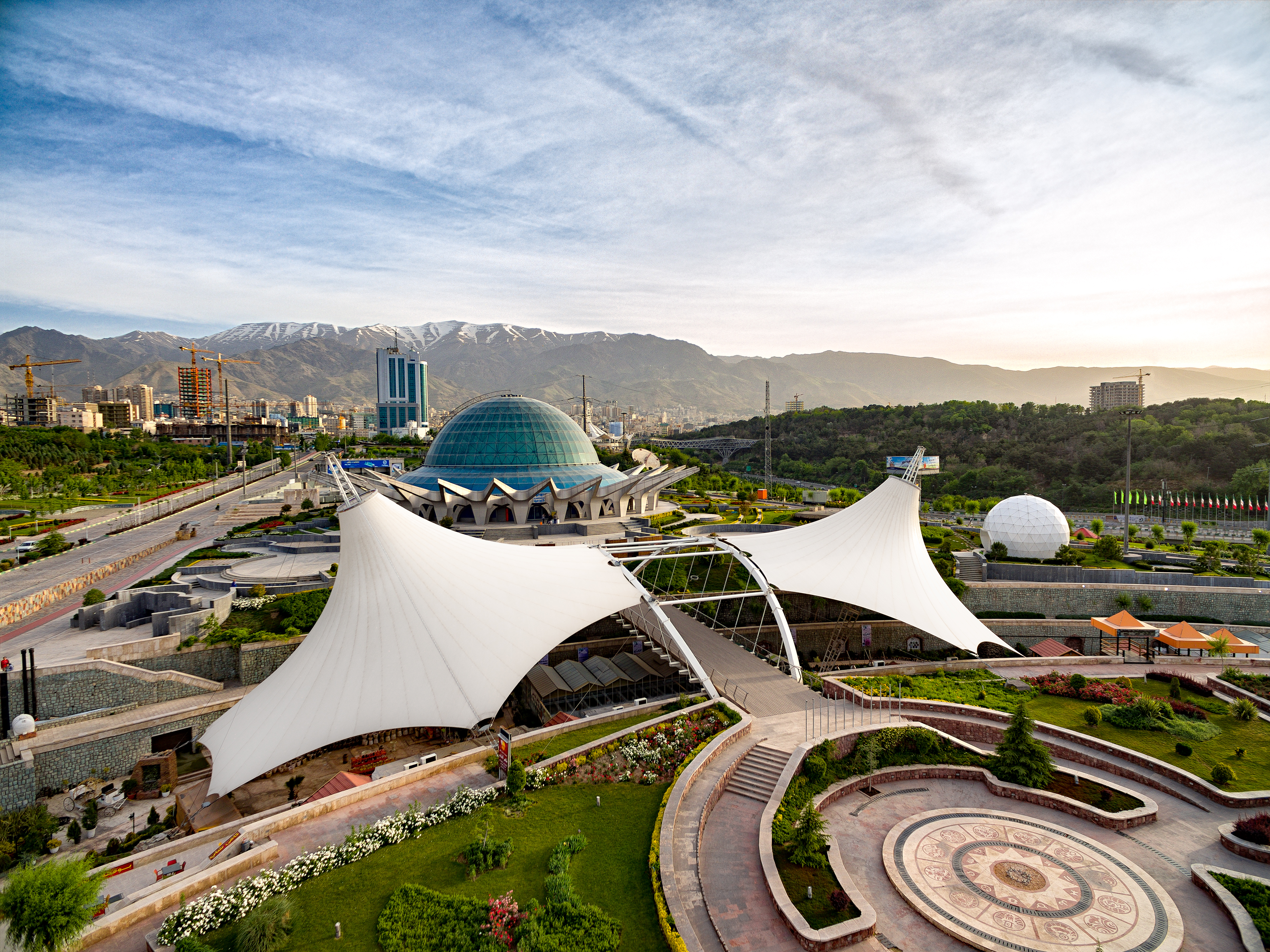
Ab-o-Atash Park in Tehran

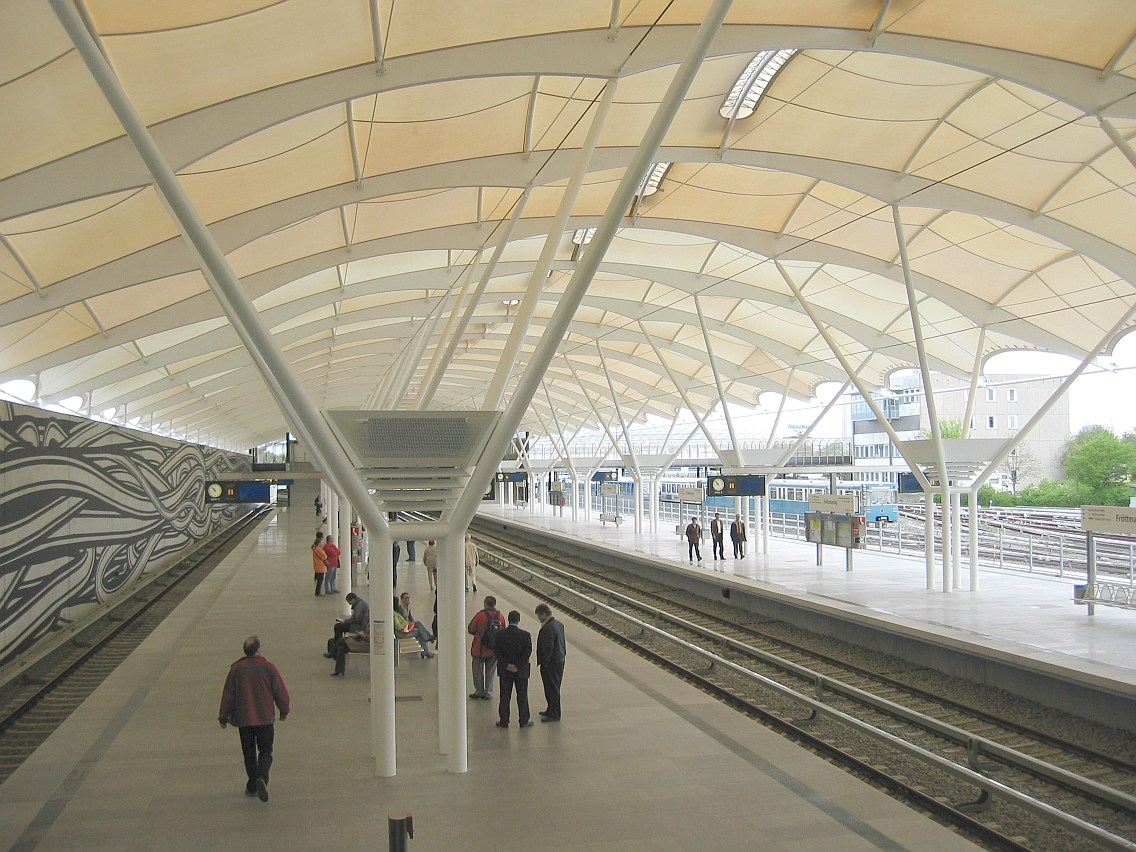
Subway station Fröttmaning, Munich, Germany

== Conference ==
The International Centre for Numerical Methods in Engineering (CIMNE) in Barcelona biennially holds the international conference Textile Composites and Inflatable Structures (Structural Membranes). The conference has been taking place in Barcelona, Stuttgart and Munich. The tenth edition of the conference will be organized in 2021 in Munich.

== Literature ==
- ETFE, Technology and Design, Annette LeCuyer, Verlag Birkhäuser, ISBN 978-3-7643-8563-7
- Membrane Structures, Hrsg. Klaus-Michael Koch, Verlag Prestel, ISBN 978-3-7913-3049-5

== See also ==
- Tensile structure
- Tension fabric building
- Fabric structure
- Air-supported structure
