= Training camp (NFL) =

NFL pre-season training

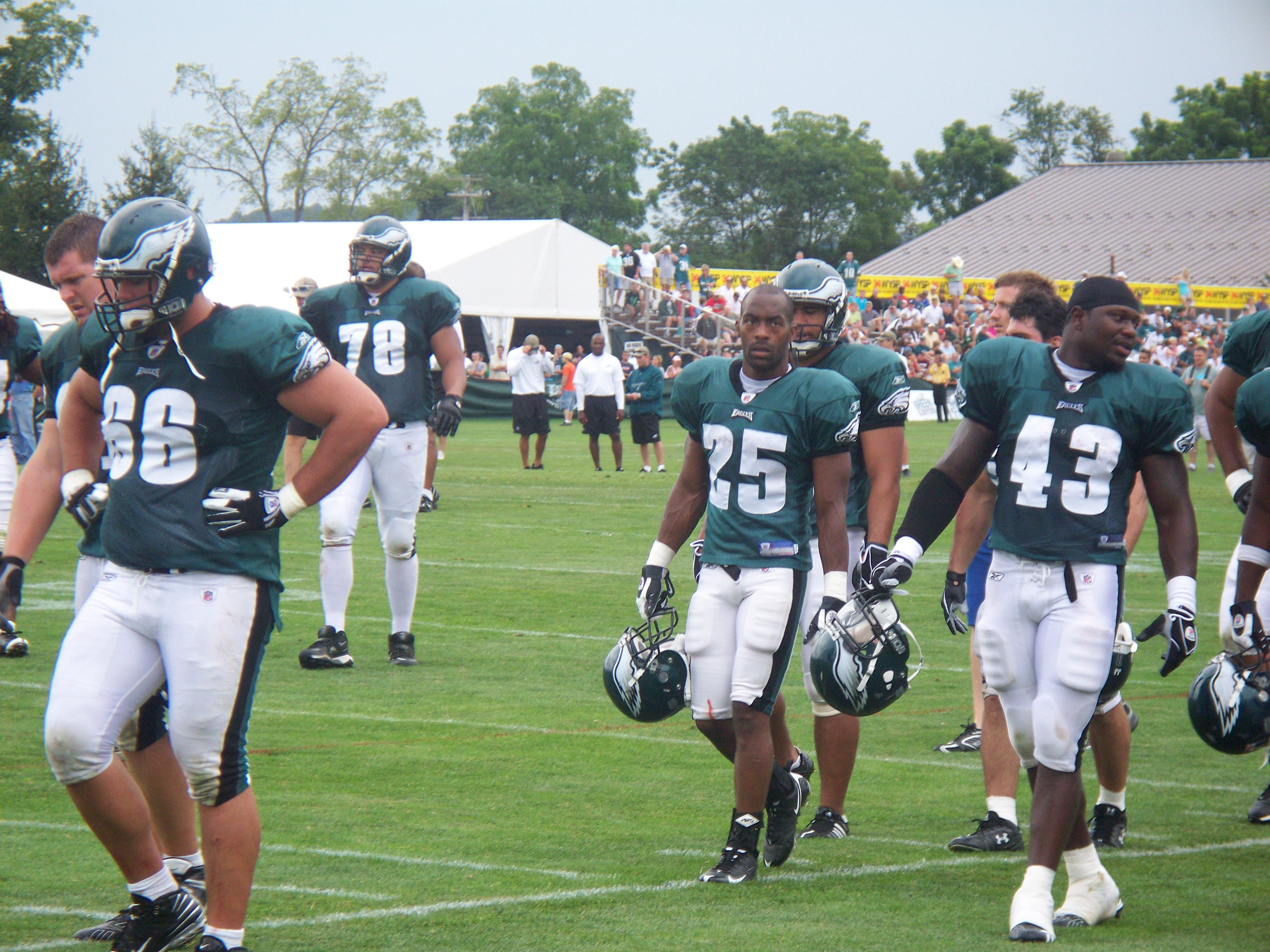
Philadelphia Eagles training camp at Lehigh University in Bethlehem, Pennsylvania, August 2009

In the National Football League (NFL), training camp refers to the time before the season commences. During this time, teams sometimes congregate at a location, usually a university, or a practice or training facility located at or near their home stadium, to conduct training camp for at least the first few weeks. This is similar to baseball's spring training.

Training camp is used in several different ways. New players and coaches use it to acclimate themselves to new teammates and systems. For younger players, it serves as a period of evaluation; for veterans, it is time to return to form.

== Overview ==
Training camp is divided into several different components. The first is scrimmages. These are pseudogames where teams run nearly full games' worth of plays. Sometimes, two practice sessions are held on the same day. This concept is referred to as "two-a-days". Other parts of training camp include drills, meetings with coaches and other players at one's position, weight training, and preseason games. The latter half of training camp leads directly into the exhibition season.

With NFL training camps starting in late July, the biggest concern has been dehydration. In 2001, Minnesota Vikings player Korey Stringer died of a medical condition based from dehydration and heatstroke. The death of Stringer prompted the NFL to change their training policies. At each practice, every team must have the team doctor and trainers on the field; additionally, an ambulance must be present during practices.

With NFL training camps beginning in late July, severe weather can affect practice and exhibition games. In 2002, a Cleveland Browns exhibition game ended due to lightning near Cleveland Browns Stadium, and severe storms have been known to disrupt training camps.

Fans are often able to visit their favorite team's training camp to catch an early look at the players; admission to practices is often free or substantially less expensive than a game ticket, making training camp trips a popular option for fans who cannot attend many games due to financial or other reasons. NFL teams often sell souvenirs and concessions at camp sites along with offering activities and events to make training camp a more fan-friendly experience.

Official NFL training camps should be distinguished from private training camps, often for certain tactics or positions.

From 2001 to 2002, 2007 to 2010, and since 2012, at least one team's training camp period has been documented on the HBO sports documentary series Hard Knocks.

== Organized team activities ==
Recently, the NFL has let teams have off-season training sessions, officially called organized team activities, or OTAs. Many teams use the OTAs to help develop players and make them better. These training sessions are in late May and early June. The OTAs are the only practices between the end of the previous season and the start of training camp. Players new to the NFL attend seminars and lectures organized by the NFL from mid-June to mid-July. Veteran players use the off time to sponsor football camps for children, golf outings for charity, or even some family time.

== Training camp sites by team ==
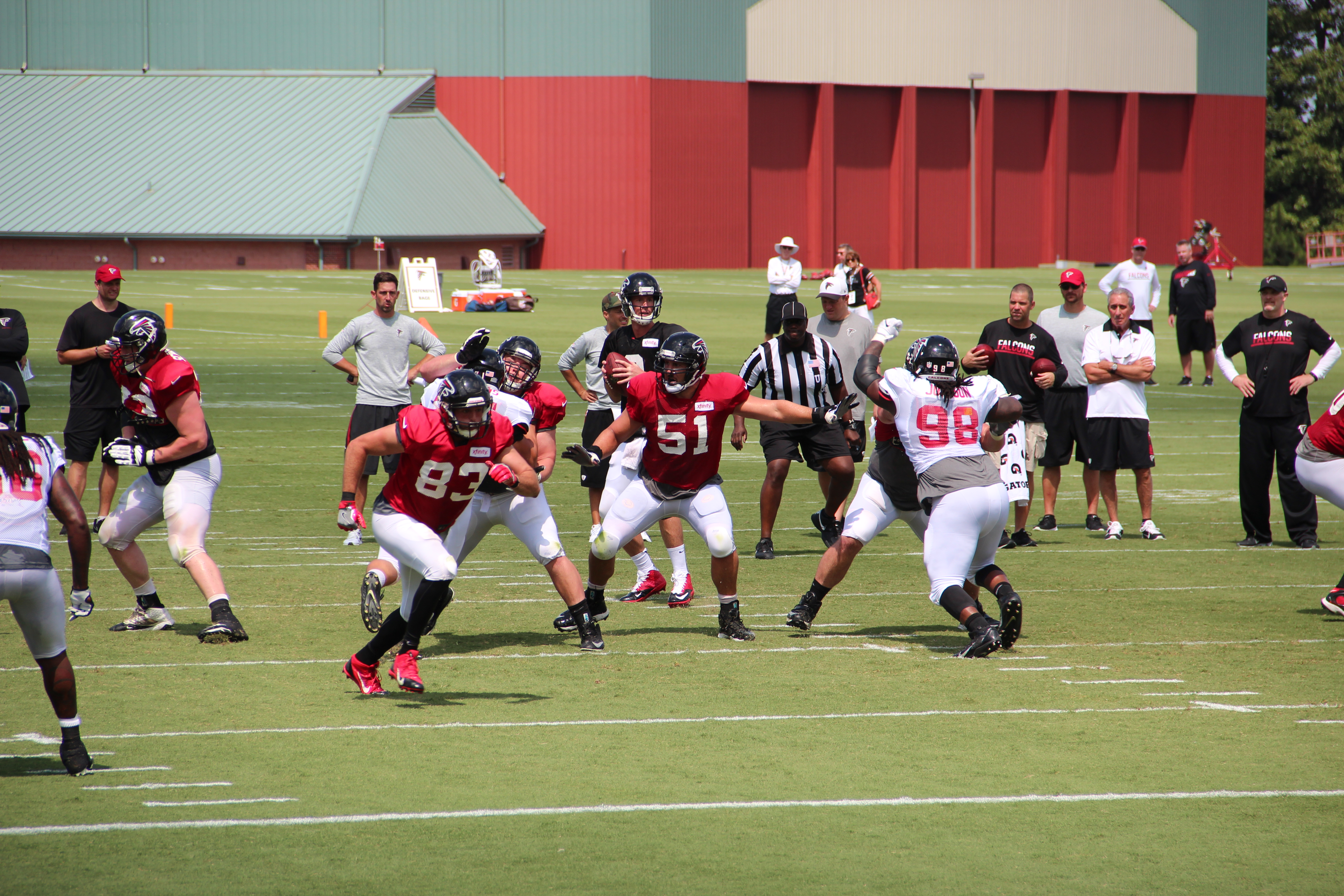
Atlanta Falcons training camp in Flowery Branch, Georgia, July 2016

Team	Site	Location	Since
Arizona Cardinals	State Farm Stadium	Glendale, Arizona	2013
Atlanta Falcons	IBM Performance Field	Flowery Branch, Georgia	2005
Baltimore Ravens	Under Armour Performance Center	Owings Mills, Maryland	2011
Buffalo Bills	St. John Fisher University	Pittsford, New York	2000 (Note: Training camp held at team's training facility during 2020 and 2021 preseasons due to COVID pandemic before returning to Pittsford in 2022.)
Carolina Panthers	Bank of America Stadium	Charlotte, North Carolina	2024
Chicago Bears	Halas Hall	Lake Forest, Illinois	2020
Cincinnati Bengals	Paycor Stadium	Cincinnati, Ohio	2012
Cleveland Browns	CrossCountry Mortgage Complex	Berea, Ohio	1992 (Note: Training camp held at Cleveland Browns training facility from 1992 through 1995 before franchise became dormant after 1995 season when team relocated to Baltimore to become the Ravens.)
Dallas Cowboys	River Ridge Playing Fields	Oxnard, California	2004 (Note: Training camp held at team's training facility during 2020 preseason due to COVID pandemic. The Cowboys also hold open practices at The Star in Frisco after breaking camp in California.)
Denver Broncos	Broncos Park	Englewood, Colorado	2003
Detroit Lions	Detroit Lions Training Facility	Allen Park, Michigan	2002
Green Bay Packers	Don Hutson Center	Ashwaubenon, Wisconsin	2003
Houston Texans	Houston Methodist Training Center	Houston, Texas	2002
Indianapolis Colts	Grand Park	Westfield, Indiana	2018
Jacksonville Jaguars	Miller Electric Center	Jacksonville, Florida	2023
Kansas City Chiefs	Missouri Western State University	St. Joseph, Missouri	2010 (Note: Training camp held at team's training facility during 2020 preseason due to COVID pandemic before returning to St Joseph in 2021.)
Las Vegas Raiders	Intermountain Healthcare Performance Center	Henderson, Nevada	2020
Los Angeles Chargers	The Bolt	El Segundo, California	2024
Los Angeles Rams	Loyola Marymount University	Los Angeles, California	2024
Miami Dolphins	Baptist Health Training Complex	Miami Gardens, Florida	2021
Minnesota Vikings	Twin Cities Orthopedics Performance Center	Eagan, Minnesota	2018
New England Patriots	Gillette Stadium	Foxboro, Massachusetts	2003
New Orleans Saints	Ochsner Sports Performance Center	Metairie, Louisiana	2004
New York Giants	Quest Diagnostics Training Center	East Rutherford, New Jersey	2013
New York Jets	Atlantic Health Training Center	Florham Park, New Jersey	2015
Philadelphia Eagles	Jefferson Health Training Complex	Philadelphia, Pennsylvania	2013
Pittsburgh Steelers	Saint Vincent College	Latrobe, Pennsylvania	1966 (Note: Training camp held at Heinz Field and the team's training facility during 2020 and 2021 preseasons due to COVID pandemic before returning to Latrobe in 2022.)
San Francisco 49ers	SAP Performance Center	Santa Clara, California	2003
Seattle Seahawks	Virginia Mason Athletic Center	Renton, Washington	2009
Tampa Bay Buccaneers	AdventHealth Training Center	Tampa, Florida	2009
Tennessee Titans	St. Thomas Sports Park	Nashville, Tennessee	2000
Washington Commanders	OrthoVirginia Training Center	Ashburn, Virginia	2022

== Differences with baseball ==
Unlike Major League Baseball's spring training, in which teams congregate at locations in either Arizona or Florida (primarily for weather reasons), NFL teams are able to hold their respective training camps all over the United States. An increasing number of clubs hold camp at their year-round headquarters/practice facilities; as many as 26 in 2025, compared to only five in 2000.

Most teams have abandoned remote locations, like the Cheese League in Minnesota and Wisconsin, to "come home" for training camp, largely for practicality reasons. Many clubs have recently constructed state-of-the-art headquarters/practice facilities, replete with amenities (multiple practice fields, indoor practice fields, weightlifting & training rooms, meeting rooms, lecture halls, film study rooms, offices, cafeteria, medical & rehabilitation facilities, IT infrastructure, media/press conference room, equipment rooms, laundry services, etc.) that cannot be provided or matched at other distant locations (colleges, parks, etc.).

Most, if not all, of these newer team headquarters were designed with hosting training camp in mind. As such, they are able to accommodate the expanded training camp roster sizes. Some even feature permanent bleachers for spectators. In addition, the cost of temporarily relocating and accommodating the entire organization to another location is substantial.

The attitudes about how to run training camp have also evolved, leading more teams to stay home. Furthermore, restrictions dictated by the league's CBA (along with the players association) limit contact and prohibit such things as two-a-days, which effectively reduce on-field activity during camp. With OTAs, minicamps, and conditioning during the offseason, players remain in top physical shape year-round. The focus of training camp is no longer getting players back into shape, but more of fostering camaraderie, filling a (usually) small number of vacant roster spots, and delving immediately into game preparation.

For example, the Lions' camp was long held at Saginaw Valley State College, the Broncos trained at the University of Northern Colorado, the Patriots at Bryant University in Smithfield, Rhode Island, and Washington went to Dickinson College, the former site of Carlisle Indian School. Tampa Bay used to train at the University of Tampa, then at the ESPN Wide World of Sports Complex before moving permanently back to their headquarters. Similarly, after many years on the road, the Jets (SUNY Cortland) and the Giants (Albany) both recently moved back to team headquarters.

A handful of teams still use somewhat distant locations at the fringes of their markets to promote their team. For instance, the Buffalo Bills moved their training camp from SUNY Fredonia to Saint John Fisher College in suburban Rochester; as a team representing one of the smallest cities in the NFL, the holding of training camp in the nearby city of Rochester allows the Bills to lay claim to a larger portion of upstate New York, thus taking advantage of a market closer in size to other teams in the NFL (similar rationale was used for the former Bills Toronto Series).

The Dallas Cowboys have historically hosted their training camp in locales very distant from their home market, even before they were given the moniker "America's Team" in the late 1970s. The Cowboys have held their training camp at the River Ridge Playing Fields in Oxnard, California, located in Ventura County, off and on since 2004. Despite the Rams returning to Southern California and the Cowboys constructing a considerable multipurpose facility in Frisco, Texas, whose main lure is being the team's practice facility, the Cowboys continue to hold the early part of their training camp in Oxnard annually.

The Raiders, despite moving from Oakland to Las Vegas in 2020, kept their training camp at the Napa Valley Marriott and Redwood Middle School in Napa, California, which they have used since 1996. The site allows the team to keep a connection to Northern California and the Bay Area fan base.

Another difference between spring training and training camp is that true intra-squad games do not take place (anymore), though informal scrimmages are very common. Split-squad games never happen in the NFL. Fairly commonly, two teams hold a short joint camp and scrimmage at a neutral site in addition to their main camp. In some cases, a team hosting another team for a preseason game may invite that team to arrive a day or two early, so they can hold a joint practice session(s).
