= Indoor practice facility =

Type of sports training venue

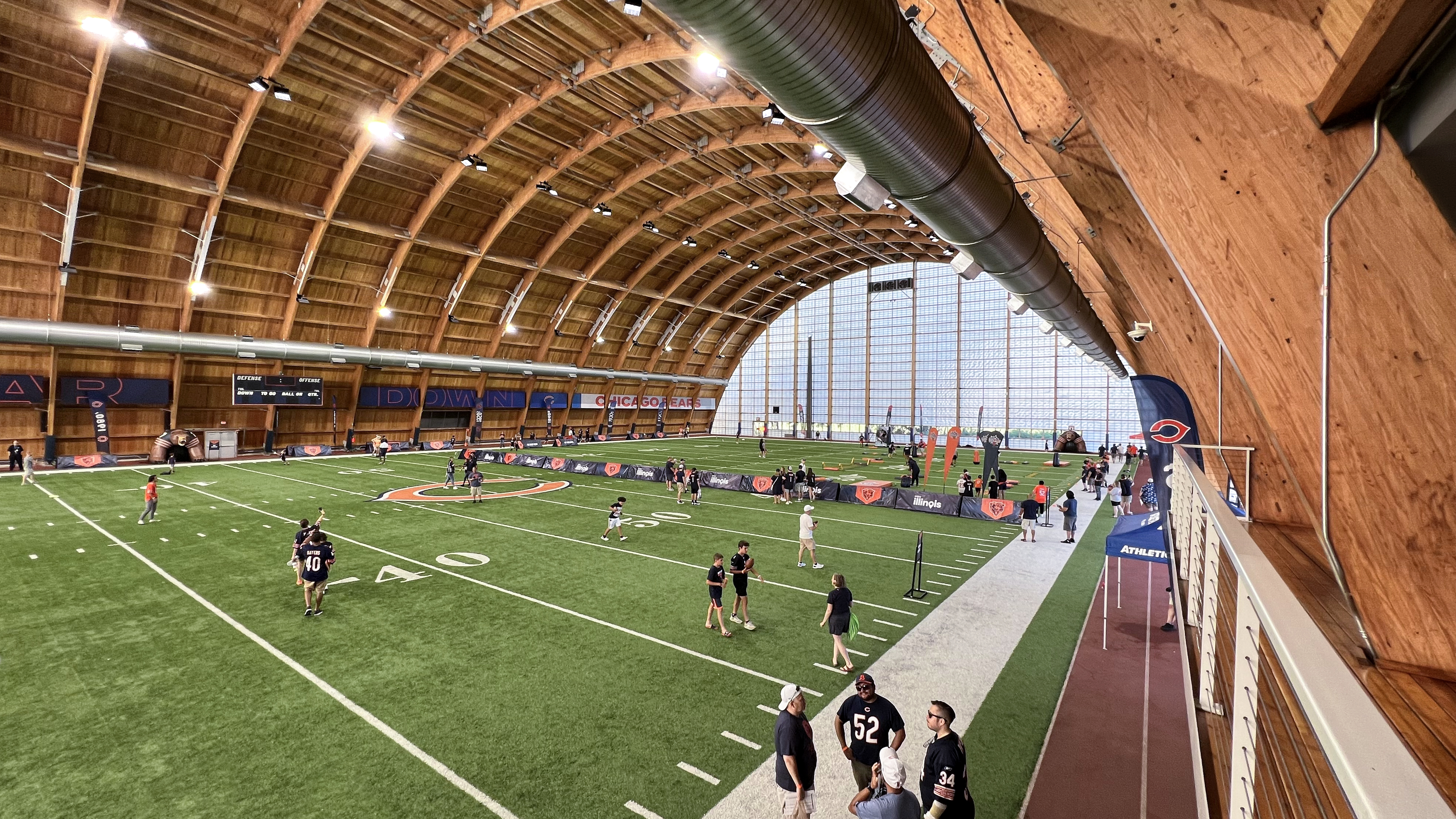
The Walter Payton Training Center, an indoor practice facility located within Halas Hall used by the Chicago Bears

An indoor practice facility is a specialized structure designed to provide athletes with a controlled environment for training and practice sessions indoors. These facilities are typically outdoor sports such as football, soccer, track and field, baseball/softball, lacrosse, ultimate Frisbee, rugby, and pickleball. The facility can also include a weight room, locker rooms, and storage space for sports equipment. The field is typically synthetic turf and line marks can be drawn for the multi-purpose facility.

== Baseball/softball ==
Baseball and softball indoor practice facilities can have a marked infield, batting cages, drop down nets, portable pitchers mound, and pitching machines.

== Track and field ==
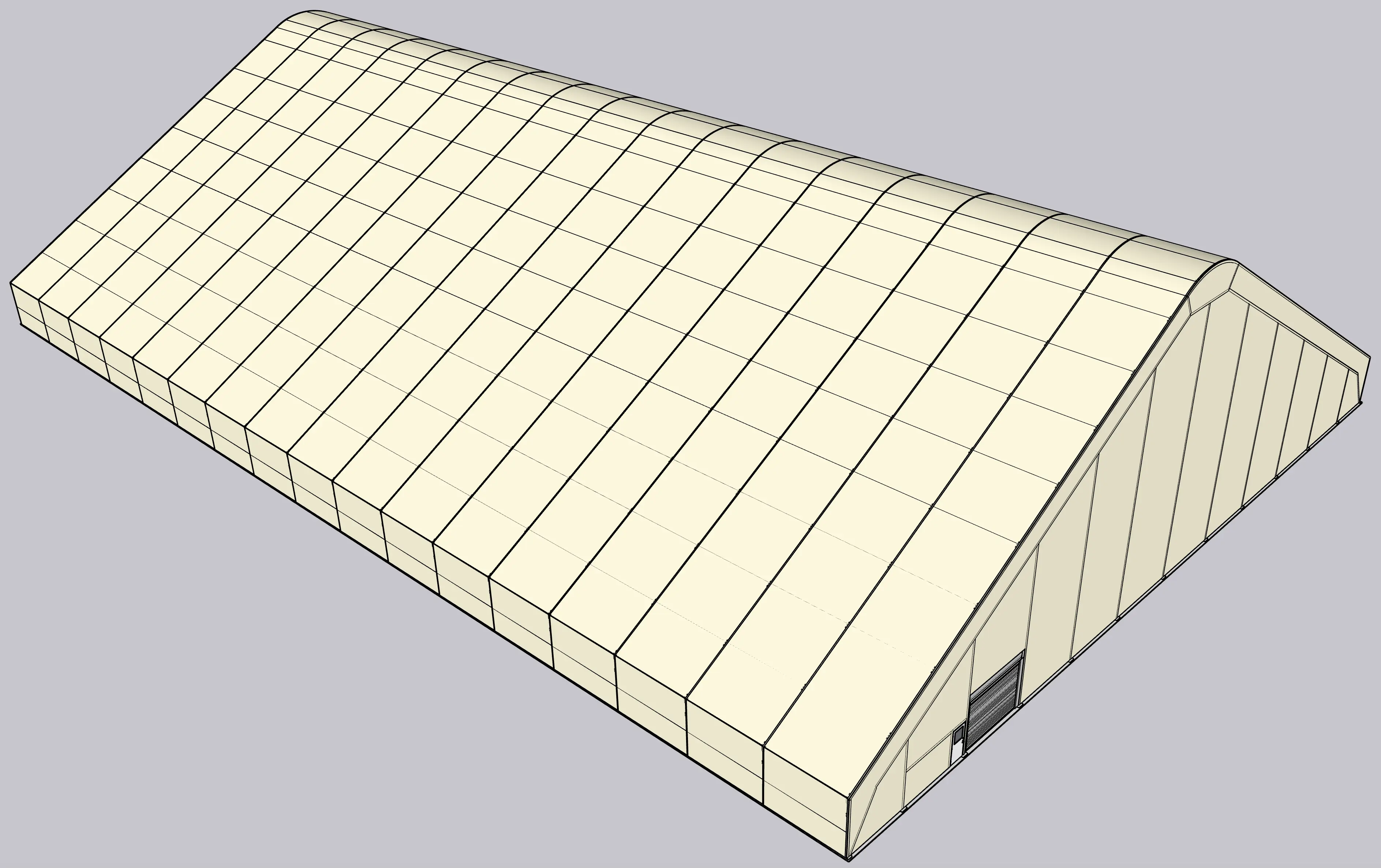
Tension fabric building with indoor practice field inside

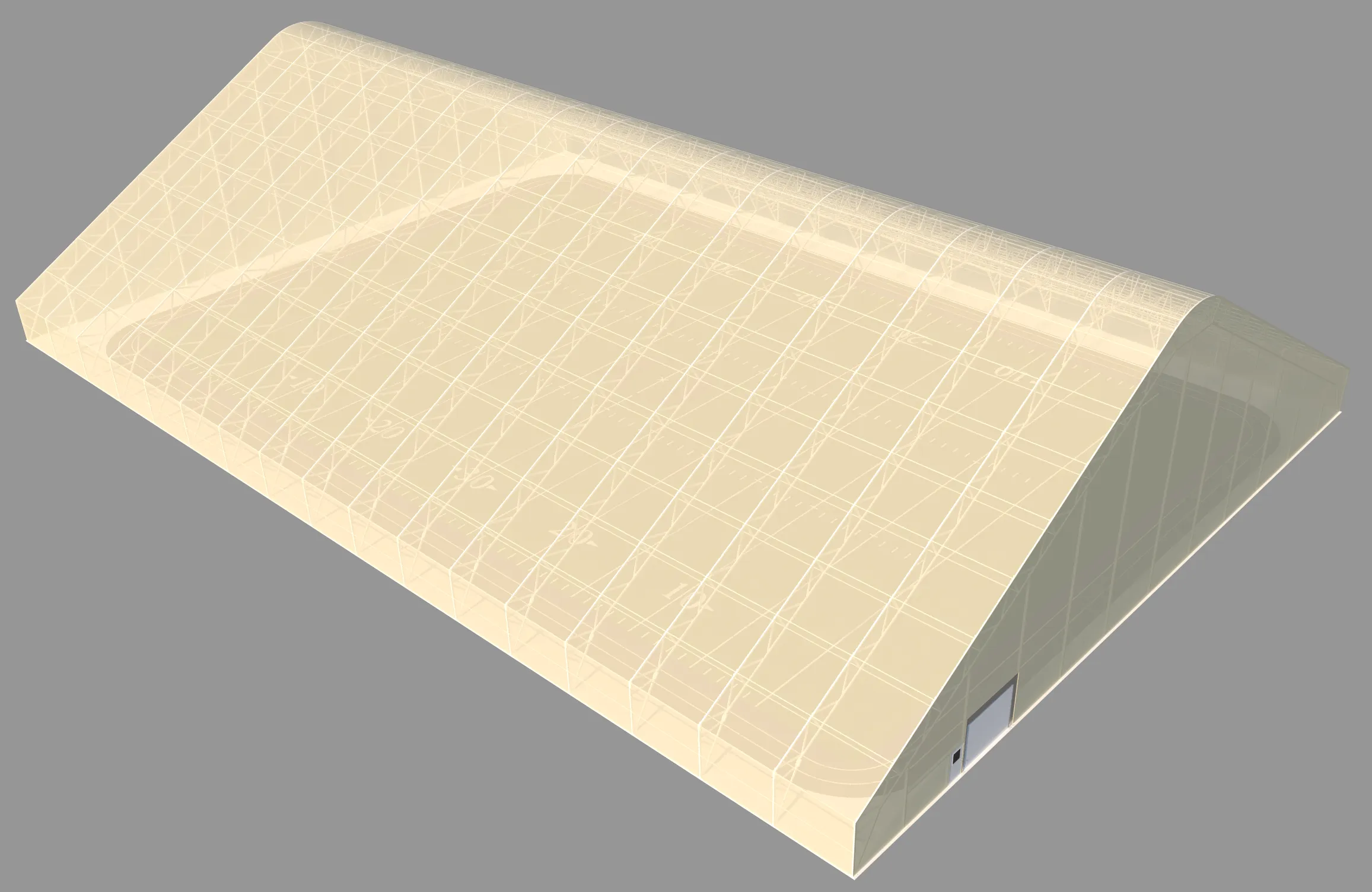
Transparent

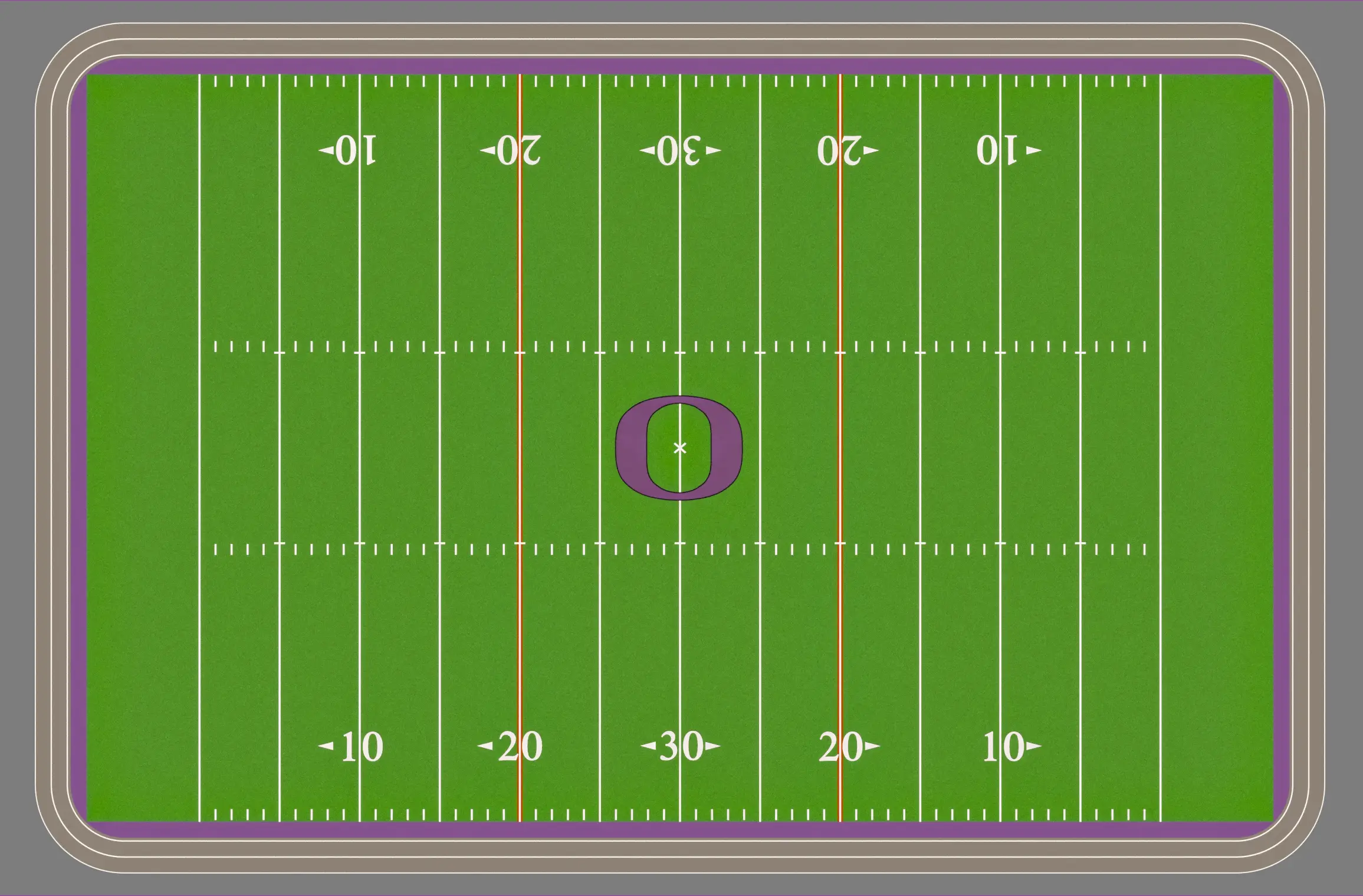
Shortened 60 yard football field with modified track around it

An indoor track can be placed around a shortened football field, like the E.J. Nutter Training Facility for the Kentucky Wildcats football, or modified tracks with sharper corners can be installed, or other types of multi-purpose surfaces could be placed inside the track.

== List of indoor practice facilities ==
- LSU Indoor Practice Facility
- Don Hutson Center - Green Bay Packers practice facility
- Jones-Hill House - Maryland College Park
- UPMC Rooney Sports Complex - Pittsburgh facility for both the Steelers and (NCAA) Pittsburgh Panthers
- Virginia Mason Athletic Center - Seattle Seahawks
- Training Facility at Nova Southeastern University - former Miami Dolphins indoor facility in a blow up bubble
- Halas Hall - Chicago Bears
- Twin Cities Orthopedics Performance Center - Minnesota Vikings

== See also ==
- Tension fabric building - inexpensive building type to house an indoor practice facility
- American football
