= VMAC (disambiguation) =

VMAC may refer to:

- VMAC ("Very high-speed MAC") is a cryptographic message authentication code algorithm
- vMac ("virtual Macintosh") is an open source emulator for Mac OS
- Virginia Mason Athletic Center, often abbreviated VMAC, is the NFL's Seattle Seahawks headquarters and training facilities
