= Tension fabric building =

Building composed of a frame covered by a tensioned fabric membrane

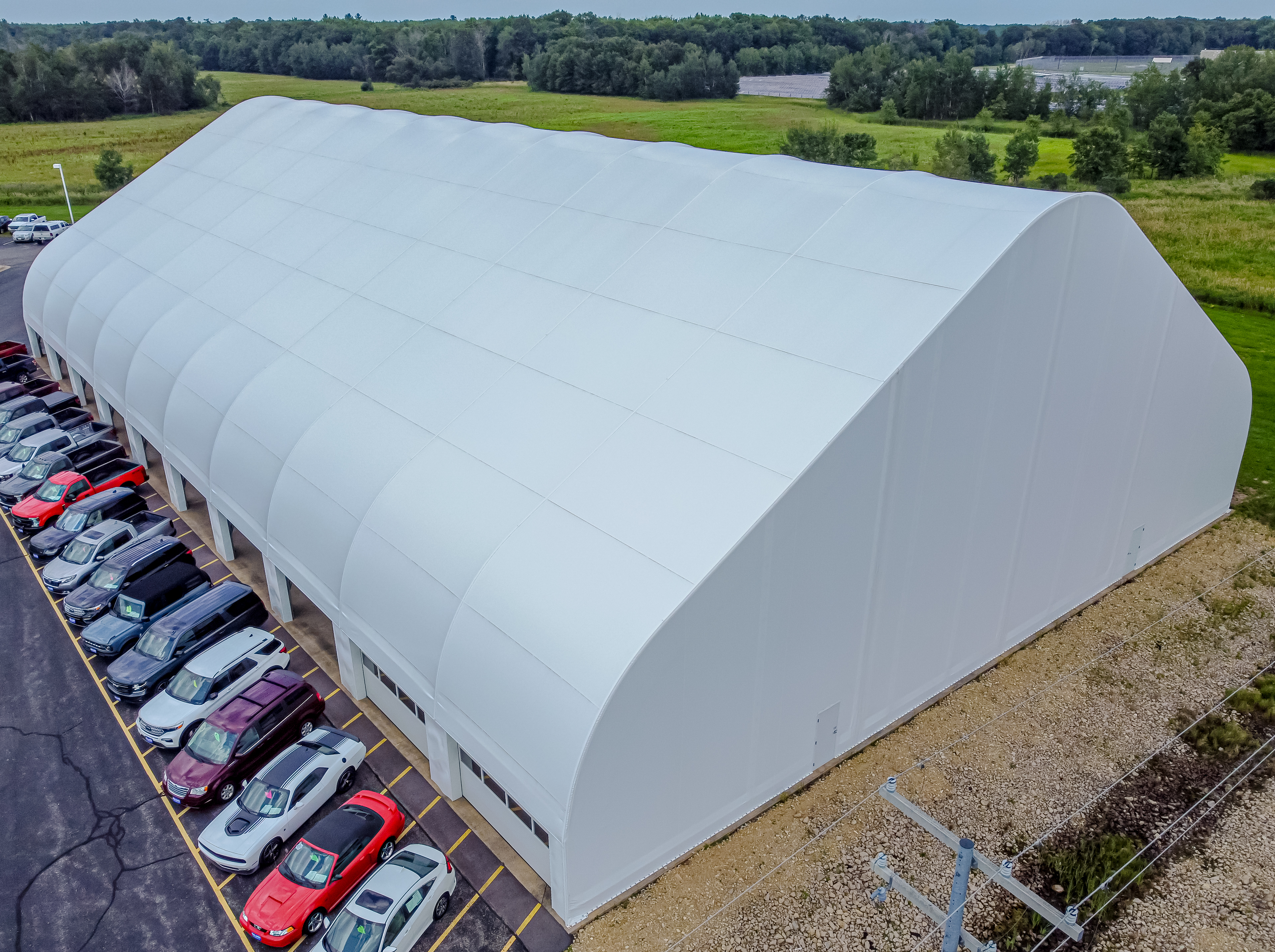
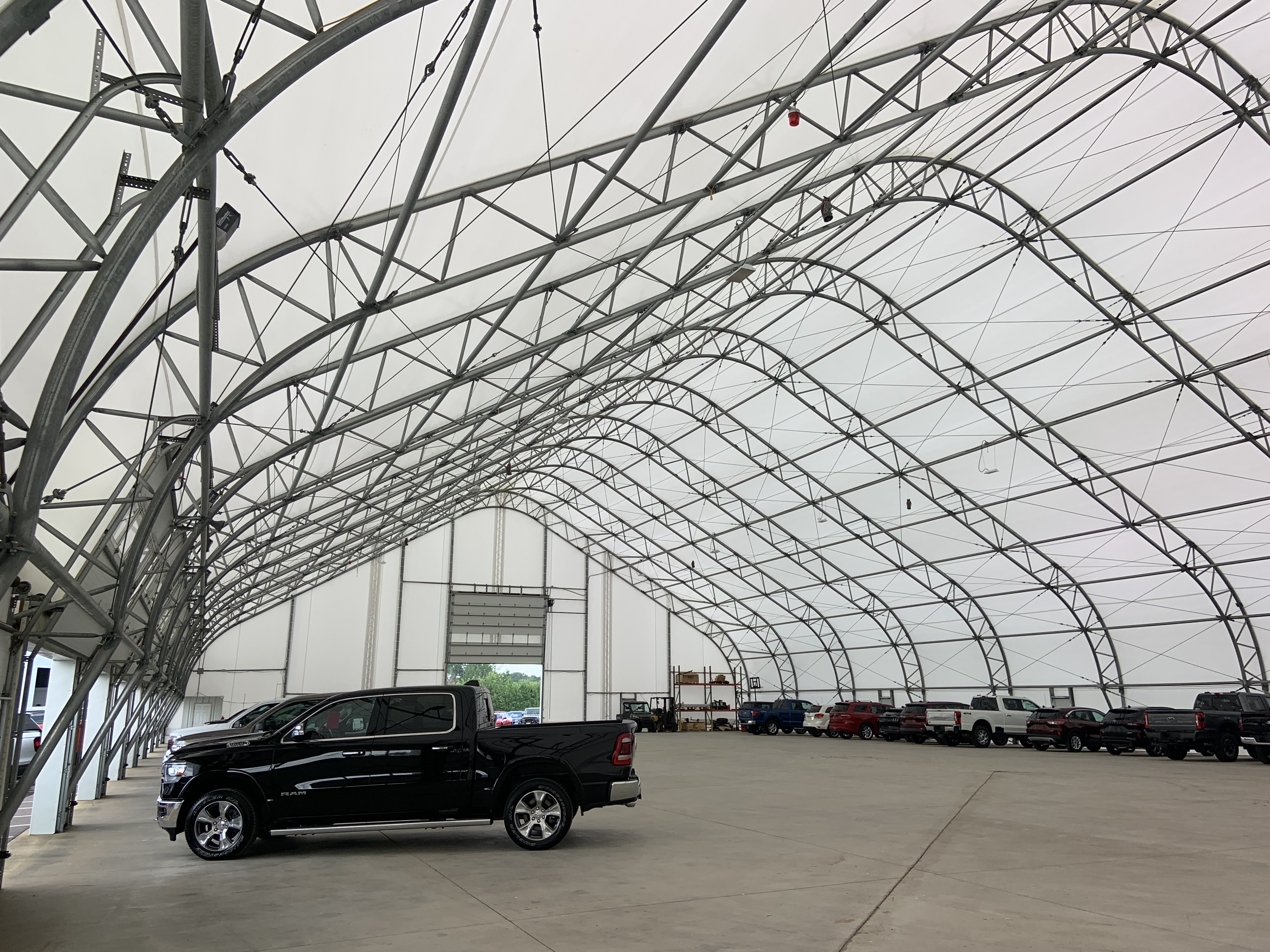
Tension fabric structure at a car dealership

Tension fabric buildings or tension fabric structures are constructed using a rigid frame—which can consist of timber, steel, rigid plastic, or aluminum—and a sturdy fabric outer membrane. Once the frame is erected, the fabric cover is stretched over the frame. The fabric cover is tensioned to provide the stable structural support of the building. The fabric is tensioned using multiple methods, varying by manufacturer, to create a tight fitting cover membrane.

Compared to traditional or conventional buildings, tension fabric buildings may have lower operational costs due to the daylight that comes through the fabric roof when light-coloured fabrics are used. This natural lighting process is known as daylighting and can improve both energy use and life-cycle costs, as well as occupant health.

Tension fabric structures may be more quickly installed than traditional structures as they use fewer materials and therefore usually require less ground works to install.

Some tension fabric structures, particularly those with aluminium frames, may be easily relocated.

== Common applications ==
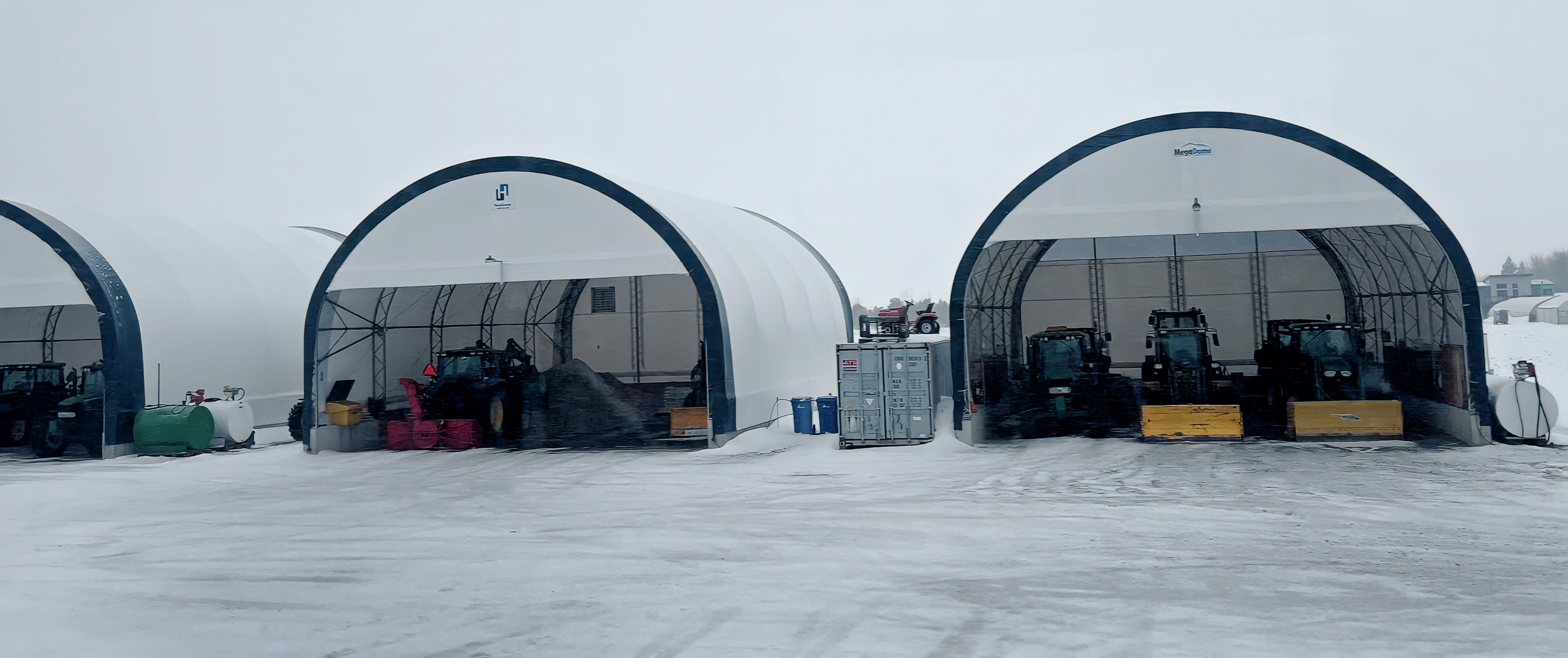
Tension fabric buildings protecting equipment from snow.

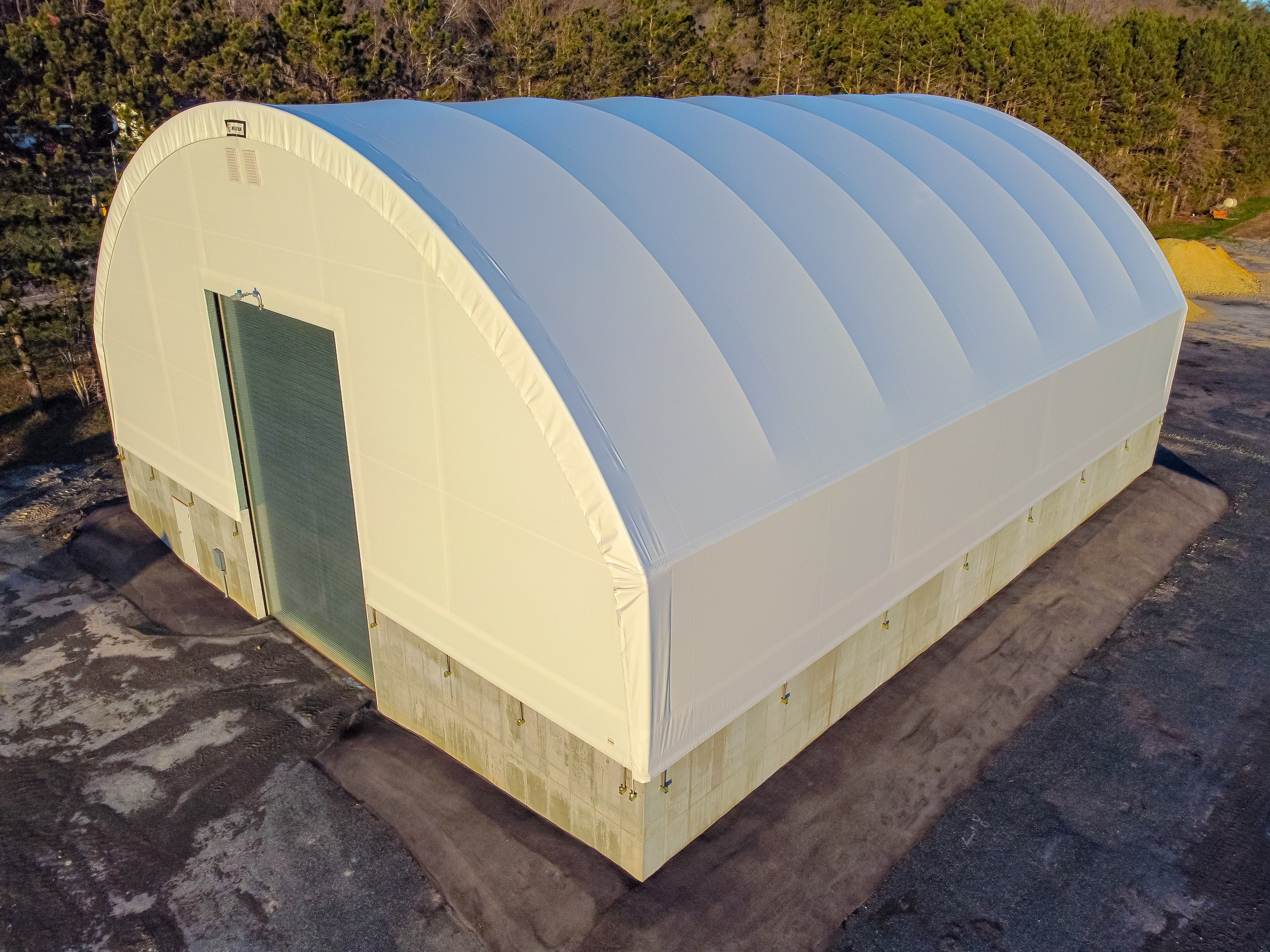
Tension fabric structure with concrete foundation walls

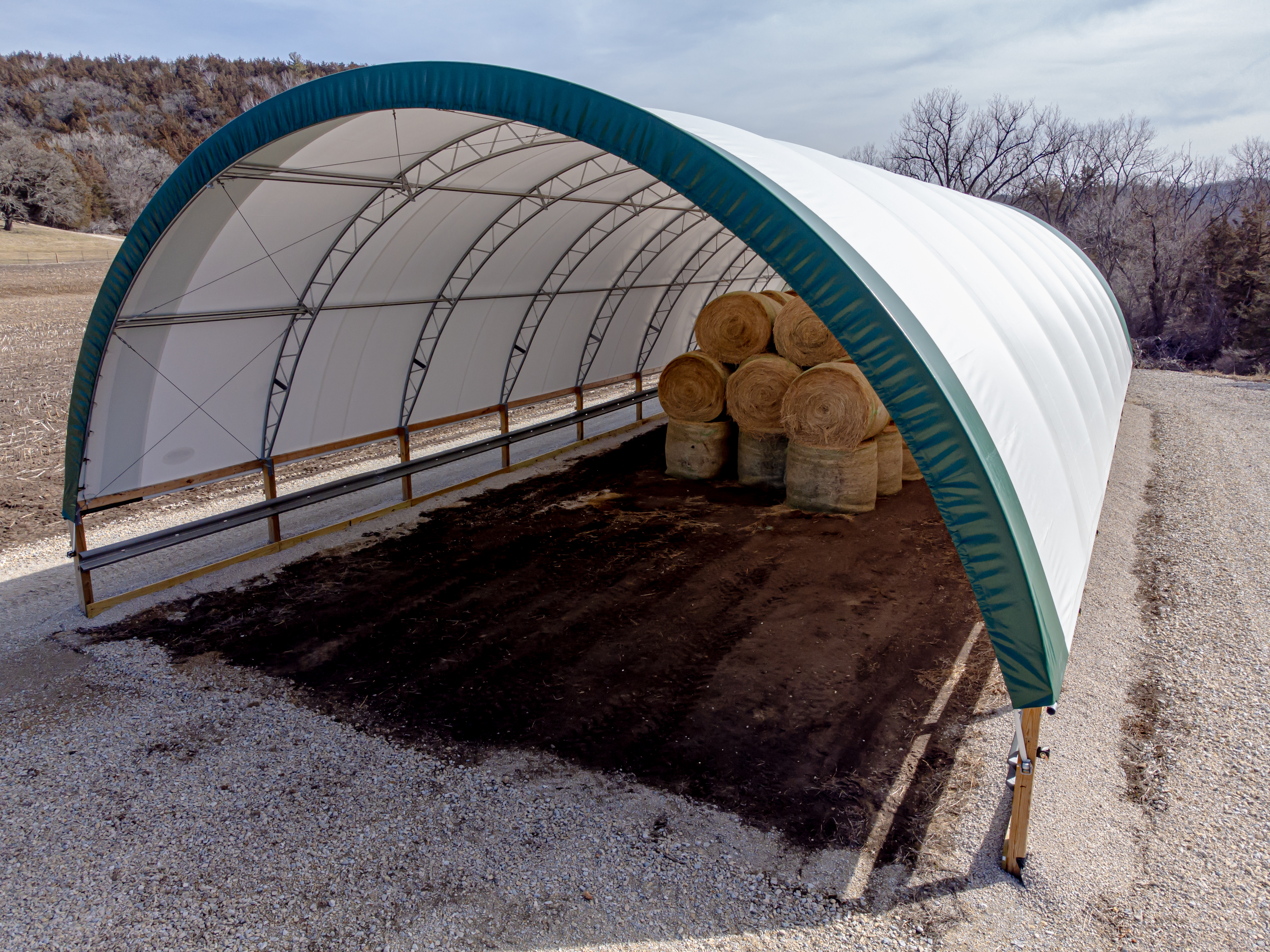
Tension fabric structure for hay storage

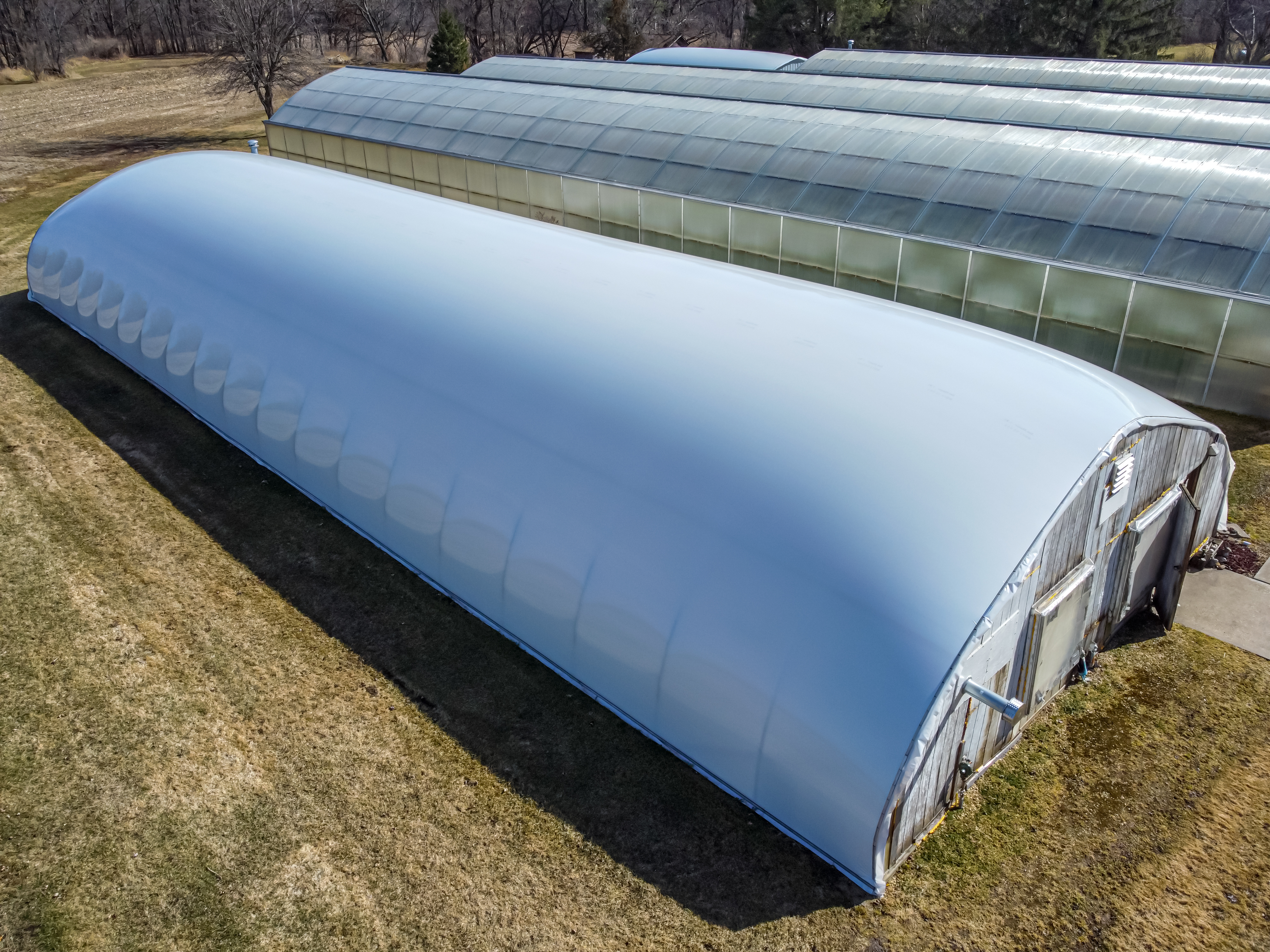
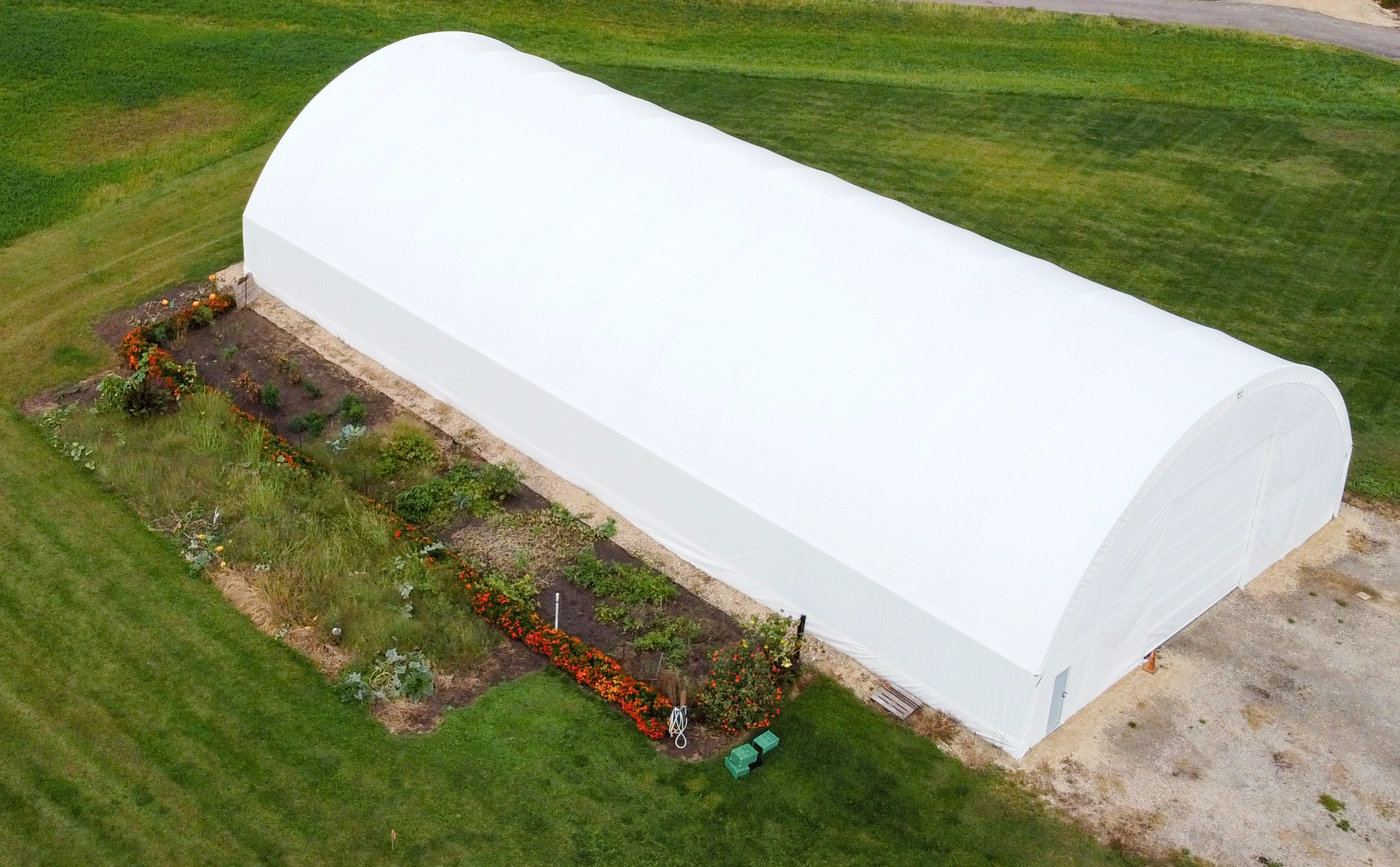
Tension fabric greenhouses

Tension fabric buildings have gained popularity over the last few decades in industries using: indoor practice facilities, commercial structures, industrial buildings, manufacturing, warehousing, sand and salt storage for road maintenance departments, environmental management, aviation, airplane hangars, marine, government, military, remediation and emergency shelters, hay and feed storage, and horse riding arenas.

These structures are suitable for quickly expanding existing facilities, by attaching the fabric structures to extend warehouses or workspaces. They can also be used as covered loading/unloading areas.

Tension fabric buildings are often used for sports due to the natural light that permeates light-coloured fabrics. These buildings provide covered indoor spaces that allow teams to train under natural daylight when weather is inclement, combating a common problem in sports known as rainout.

The light weight of the fabric roofs enables the construction of tension fabric structures up to 100 m (330 ft) clear span without supporting pillars or columns, contributing to the use of these buildings for applications that require large open spaces. One example is Phase 2 of the Sport Ireland National Indoor Arena project which includes a tension fabric building that will be 18,480 m^{2} (198,900 ft^{2}) in size, to be used for gaelic games, rugby and soccer.

These buildings may also be used for holding livestock or as indoor riding arenas, due to the controlled interior climate and the existence of tension structures that run over 1 mi (1.6 km) long.

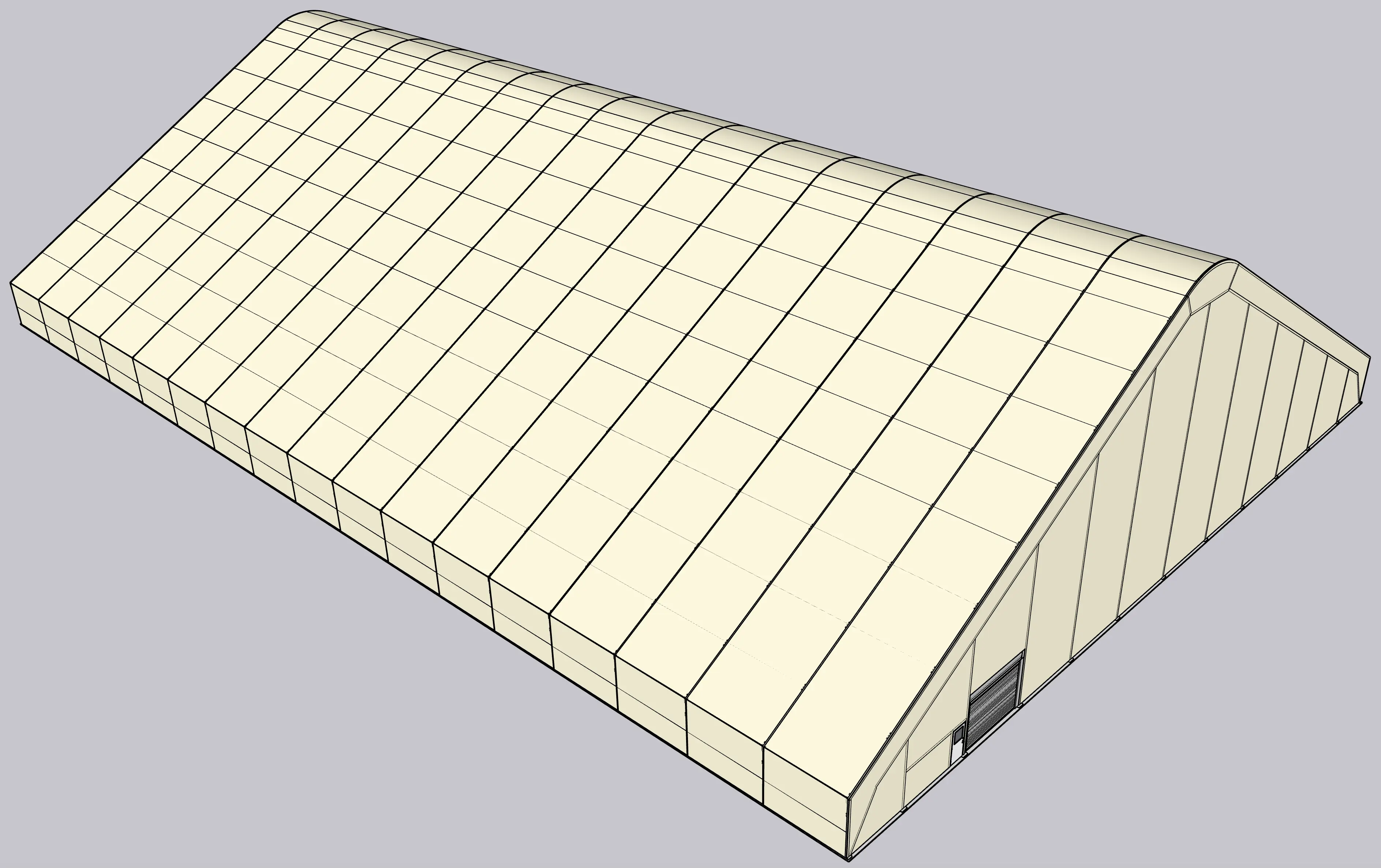
Tension fabric building with indoor practice facility inside

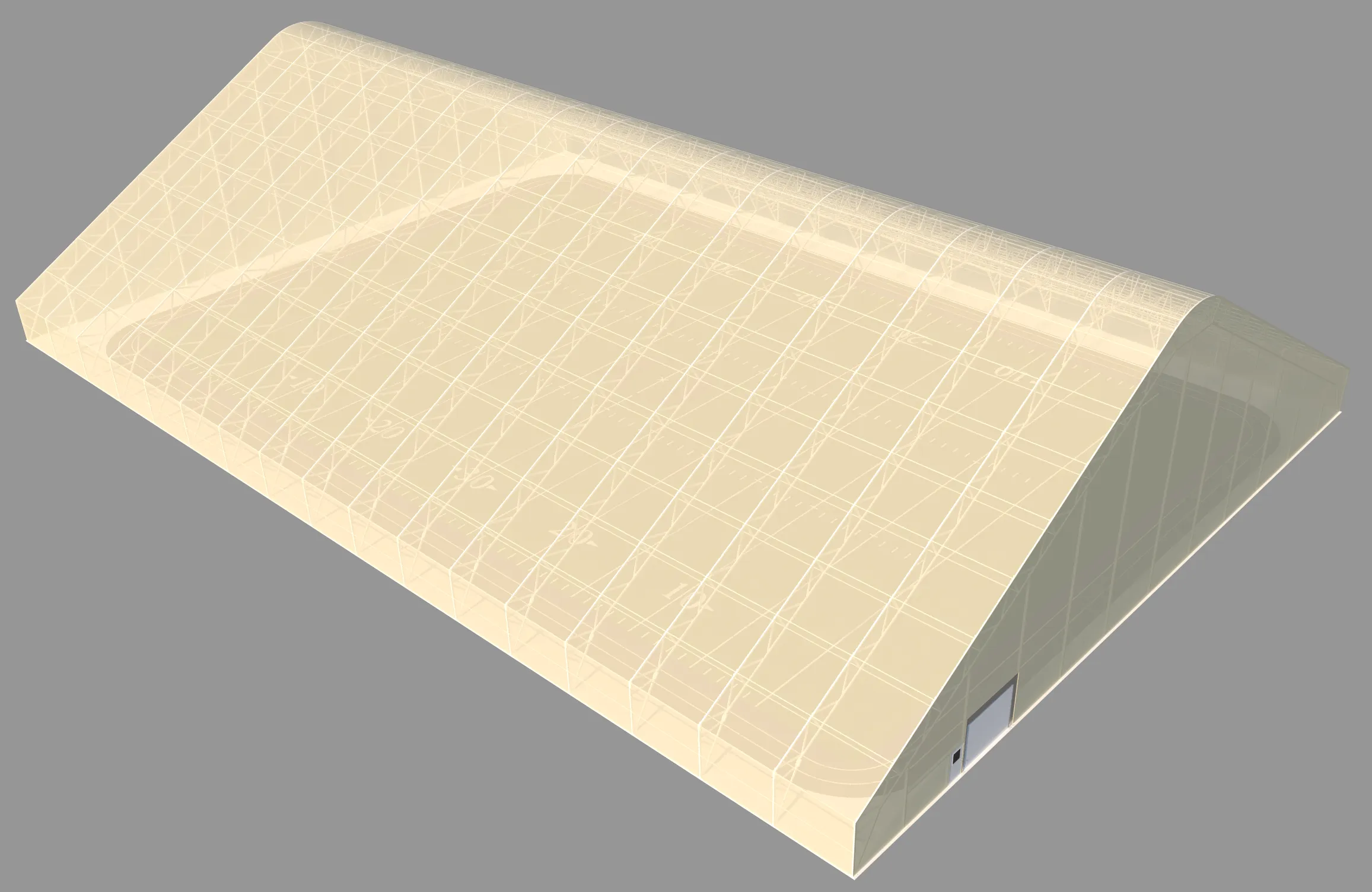
Transparent

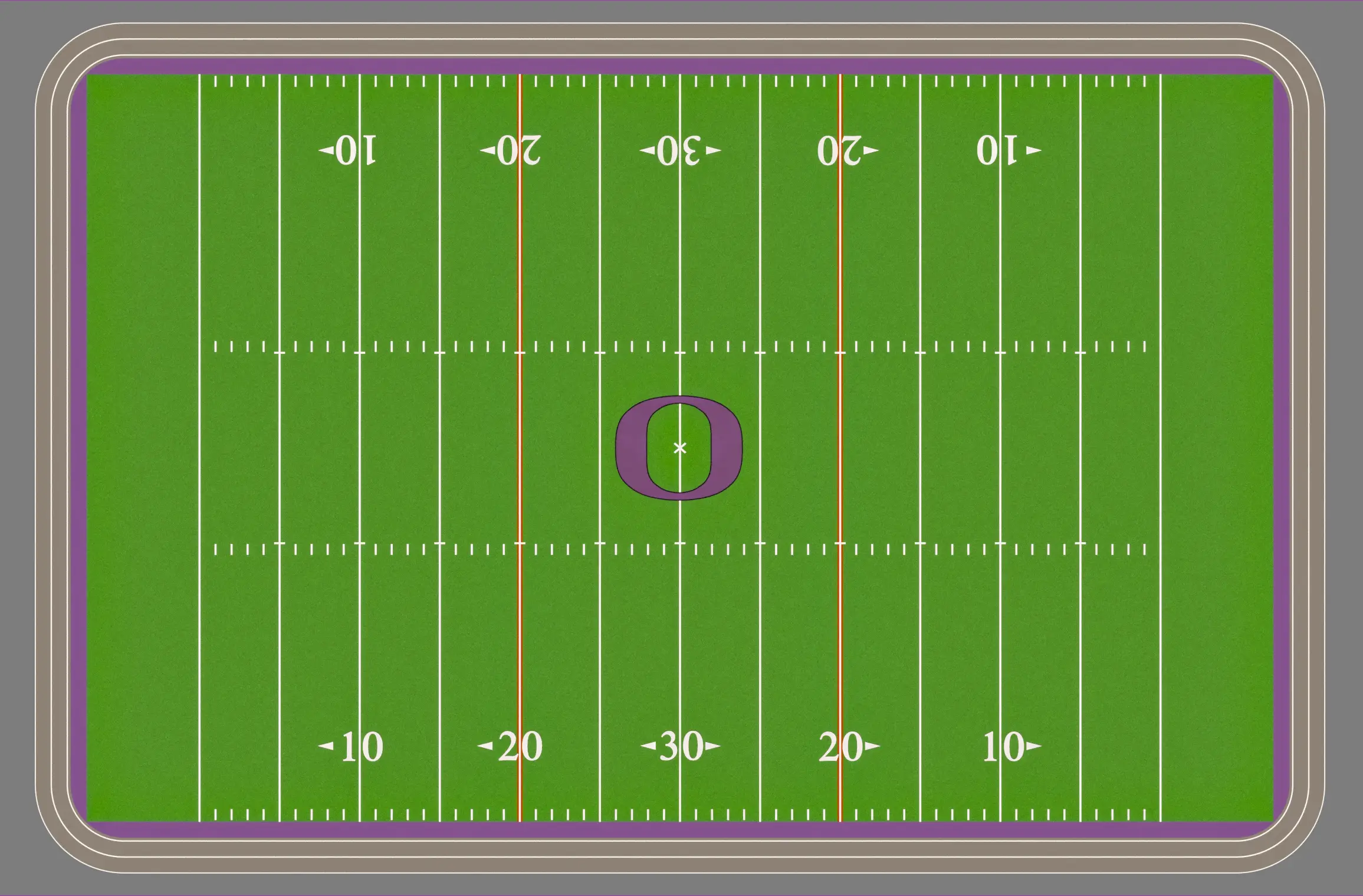
Shortened 60 yard football field with modified track around it

== Construction ==
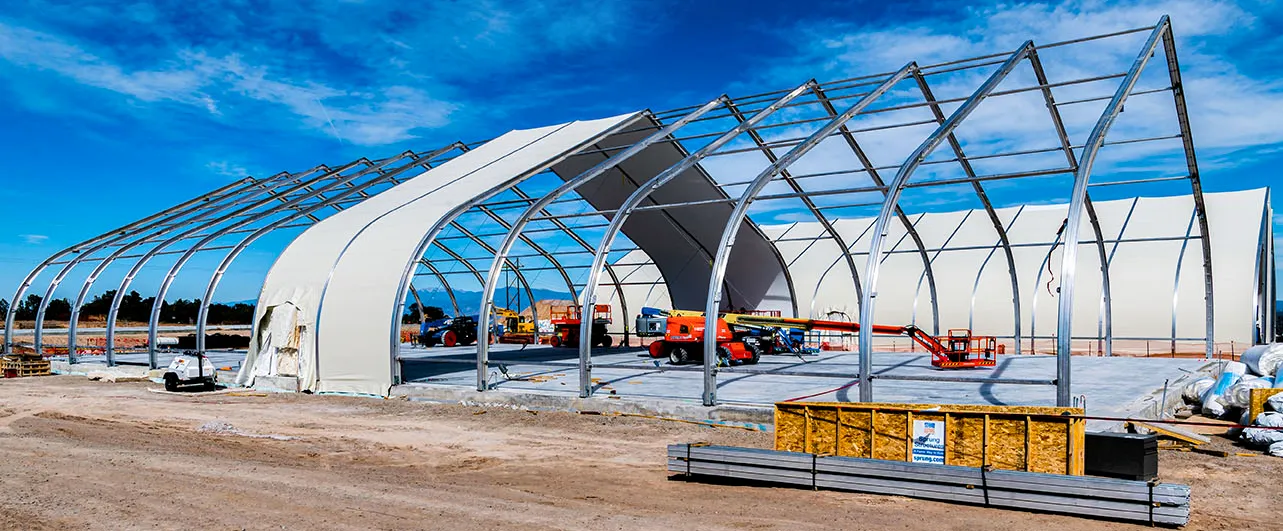
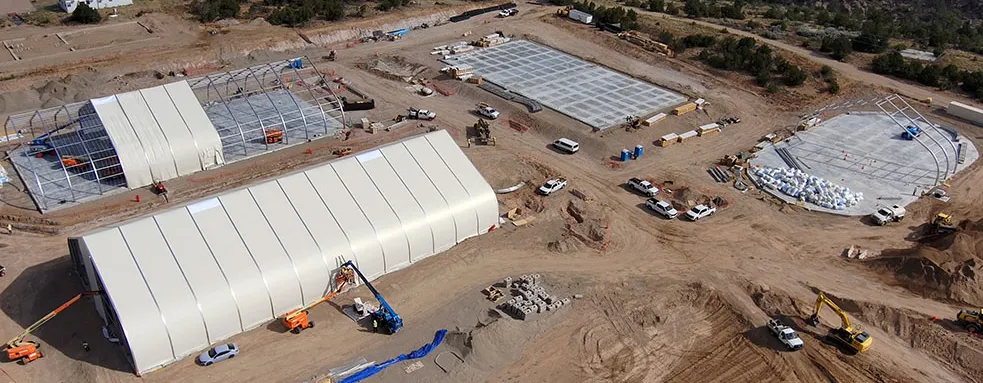
Tension fabric buildings construction site

Building sizes are usually standardized by the nature of being a pre-engineered building. Some manufacturers produce tension fabric buildings spanning up to 300 feet wide and to almost any length. Buildings can be designed to be portable, mounted on wheels or other rolling crane-type designs fitted to the base-plates, or lifting in modules by overhead cranes.

Industrial strength fabric, which can have life expectancies of 20–30 years, have been used for many applications. Fabric life expectancy is affected by local environmental factors (e.g. sunlight, temperature, wind, air quality) and occupancy conditions (e.g. humidity, chemical vapours). The structural membranes available as of 2020 are made of PVC or polyethylene. Some fabrics are sufficiently translucent to allow sunlight to pass through, creating a naturally lit environment inside the building. Fabric selection influences project capital cost and maintenance.

== Building regulation ==
In some jurisdictions tension fabric buildings may qualify as temporary structures which benefit from a shorter capital depreciation period, relative to a permanent structure, for tax purposes. Buildings classified as temporary structures may have significant limitations on occupancy, applied load and fire safety considerations and period of installation.

Whilst a common application of tension fabric buildings is temporary use, it is not exempt from regulatory requirements including compliance with building codes, occupancy classifications, aesthetics and building permits. Fabric tension buildings are required to meet the same building code safety requirements and applicable design standards as any other structure.

Tension fabric buildings may also be permanent structures with structural longevity varying according to manufacturer.

== See also ==
- Tensile structure
- Membrane structure
- Fabric structure
