= Vinyl coated polyester =

Material made from polyester scrim

Vinyl coated polyester is a material frequently used for flexible fabric structures. It is made up of a polyester scrim, a bonding or adhesive agent, and an exterior PVC coating. The scrim supports the coating (which is initially applied in liquid form) and provides the tensile strength, elongation, tear strength, and dimensional stability of the resulting fabric. Depending on its formula, the PVC coating makes the material waterproof and resistant to dirt, mildew, oil, salt, chemicals and UV rays and gives the material added strength and durability. It can be sewn or heat sealed by way of RF(Radio Frequency) welding or hot-air welding.

The base fabric's tensile strength is determined by the size (denier) and strength of the yarns and the number of yarns per linear distance. The larger the yarn and the more yarns per inch, the greater the finished product's tensile strength.

The adhesive agent acts as a chemical bond between the polyester fibers and the exterior coating and prevents fibers from wicking, or absorbing water into the scrim. This prevents damage caused by absorbed water during a freeze thaw cycle.

The PVC coating (vinyl Organisol or Plastisol) contains chemicals to achieve the desired color, water, mildew resistance, and flame retardancy. Fabric can also be manufactured with levels of light transmission that range from very transparent to completely opaque. After the coating has been applied to the scrim, the fabric is put through a heating chamber that dries the liquid coating.

== See also ==
Fabric structure
