= Virginia Mason Athletic Center =

Training facilities of Seattle Seahawks

- VMAC, "V-Mac"
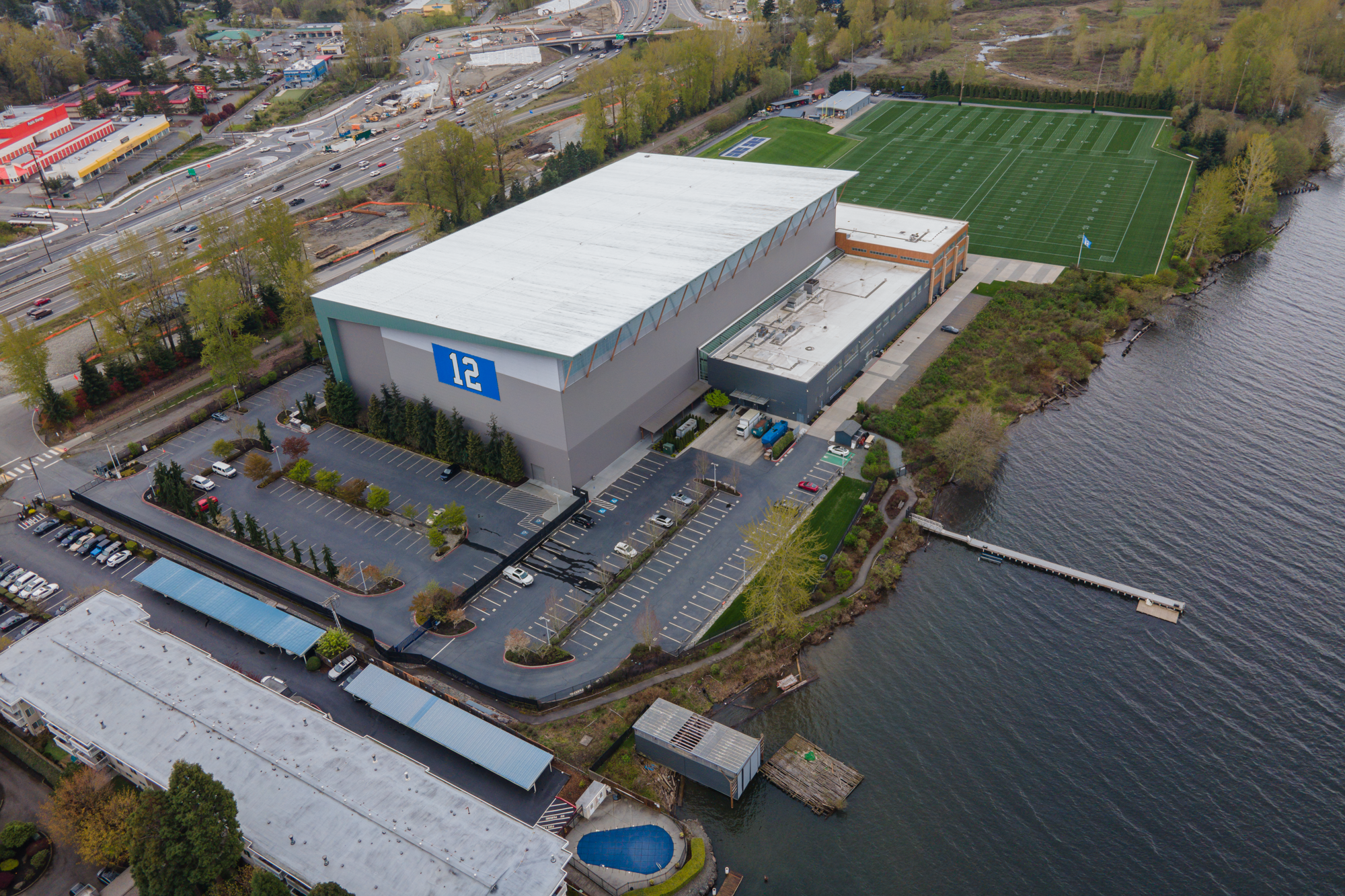

- Location in the United States Location in Washington
- Interactive map of Virginia Mason Athletic Center
- Location: 12 Seahawks Way; Renton, Washington, U.S.
- Coordinates: 47.535°N 122.198°W
- Owner: Vulcan Real Estate
- Type: Training Facility

Construction
- Built: 2007
- Opened: Summer 2008; 18 years ago
- Cost: $60 million ($89.7 million in 2025)

Website
- VMAC

The Virginia Mason Athletic Center (VMAC) is the headquarters and practice facility of the NFL's Seattle Seahawks, in Renton, Washington, a suburb southeast of Seattle. A privately funded facility, it is situated on 19 acres (0.077 km^{2}) of industrial property on the southeastern shore of Lake Washington. The team holds mini-camps and training camp here. Beginning with the 2009 season, the Seahawks opened their training camp to the public.

The site is bounded by Interstate 405 to the east, Lake Washington to the west, residential properties to the north and open land area to the south. Its southern boundary is located approximately quarter-mile (400 m) north of NE 44th Street. The Eastside Rail Corridor trail runs adjacent to the facility, and connects the area with north Renton and Factoria in Bellevue.

== History ==
The site was formerly home to a coal tar refinery and creosote plant. Seahawks owner Paul Allen purchased the land in 2000 through his company Vulcan Real Estate, with approval from the City of Renton and the state Department of Ecology. Along with the construction of the facility, an agreement was created to restore the environmental climate of the site and its wetlands by improving and redeveloping the site.

During the Seahawks' first ten seasons (1976–85), the team's headquarters was located in Kirkland at the southern end of the Lake Washington Shipyard (now Carillon Point), on the shores of Lake Washington. The summer training camps were held across the state at Eastern Washington University in Cheney, southwest of Spokane.

When the team's new headquarters in Kirkland was completed ahead of the 1986 season, the Seahawks held training camp there for the next eleven seasons. While there, the players stayed in the dormitories of the adjacent Northwest College. For the 1997 season, the team returned training camp to Cheney through 2006, then returned to Kirkland in 2007 because of the scheduled China Bowl game that was later canceled. On May 9, 2006, the Seahawks announced plans for a state-of-the-art training facility to be located along Lake Washington. The 200,000-square-foot (18,600 m^{2}) waterfront facility, second-largest in the NFL, would be located within the northern city limits of Renton and opened in the summer of 2008.

The VMAC has hosted several international soccer teams that visit Seattle for exhibition matches and other games, primarily against Seattle Sounders FC. During the 2025 FIFA Club World Cup, the VMAC was designated as the training facility for Italian club Inter Milan. The football fields were temporarily replaced with grass soccer pitches. The team used the facility's auxiliary locker rooms and athletic rooms, as well as the normal weight rooms.

== Naming & partnership ==
Following plans for the new headquarters, the Seahawks announced an expanded partnership with Virginia Mason Medical Center.

== Facilities ==
The VMAC features four practice fields, three outdoors and one indoors. The outdoor fields are natural grass whereas the indoor field is FieldTurf. The indoor field has a clear height of 95 feet (29 m) to allow both kicking and punting. The facility also features a large berm just beside the outdoor fields for Seahawks fans to watch training camp from.

The first floor of the building, approximately 50,000 square feet (4,600 m^{2}), holds an auditorium and the team area: locker room, lounge, training room, weight room, team meeting rooms, and media production studios. The second floor, approximately 48,000 square feet (4,500 m^{2}) houses the Seahawks football administration of coaching and football personnel offices, the draft room, cafeteria, and weight room mezzanine. The third floor holds Seahawks administrative offices.

The on-site parking lot holds 275 vehicles. A dock was constructed in order to accommodate boats of the team personnel.

== Size ==
Size comparison of the new and former Seahawks facilities
	VMAC	Kirkland
Site size	19 acres (77,000 m^{2})	10 acres (40,000 m^{2})
Total space	220,000 sq ft (20,000 m^{2})	41,000 sq ft (3,800 m^{2})
Locker room	5,700 sq ft (530 m^{2})	1,140 sq ft (106 m^{2})
Weight room	6,000 sq ft (560 m^{2})	2,430 sq ft (226 m^{2})
Training room	4,300 sq ft (400 m^{2})	1,836 sq ft (170.6 m^{2})
Player lounge	1,350 sq ft (125 m^{2})	None
Dining room	2,200 sq ft (200 m^{2})	924 sq ft (85.8 m^{2})
Kitchen	1,800 sq ft (170 m^{2})	221 sq ft (20.5 m^{2})
Grass Fields	3	2
FieldTurf Fields	1	1
