= Fabric structure =

A fabric structure is a structure made of fabric, with or without a structural frame made from the weaving of the fabric itself . The technology provides end users a variety of aesthetic free-form building designs. Custom-made structures are engineered and fabricated to meet worldwide structural, flame retardant, weather-resistant, and natural force requirements. Fabric structures are considered a sub-category of tensile structure.

A fabric structure's material selection, design, engineering, fabrication, and installation are integral components to ensuring a sound structure.

== Fabric structure basics ==
=== Membrane materials ===
Most fabric structures are composed of actual fabric rather than meshes or films. Typically, the fabric is coated and laminated with synthetic materials for increased strength, durability, and environmental resistance. Among the most widely used materials are polyesters laminated or coated with polyvinyl chloride (PVC), and woven fiberglass coated with polytetrafluoroethylene (PTFE).

=== Cotton canvas ===
The traditional fabric for fabric structures is light cotton twill, light canvas, or heavy proofed canvas.

=== Polyesters ===
Strength, durability, cost, and stretch make polyester material the most widely used in fabric structures. Polyesters that are laminated or coated with PVC films are usually the least expensive option for longer-term fabrications. Laminates generally consist of vinyl films over woven or knitted polyester meshes (called scrims or substrates), while vinyl-coated polyesters usually have a high-count, high-tensile base fabric coated with a bondable substance that provides extra strength. Precontraint fabric is made by placing the polyester fabric under tension both before and during the coating process. This results in a weave that has increased dimensional stability.

=== Vinyl-laminated polyesters ===
A laminated fabric usually is composed of a reinforcing polyester scrim pressed between two layers of unsupported PVC film. For most fabric structure uses, however, it refers to two or more layers of fabric or film joined by heat, pressure, and an adhesive to form a single ply.

With an open-weave or mesh polyester scrim, the exterior vinyl films bond to themselves through the openings in the fabric. Heavier fabric scrims, however, are too tightly woven to allow the same bonding. In this case, an adhesive is used to bond the exterior films to the base fabric.

A good chemical bond is critical to both prevention of delamination and development of seam strengths. The seam is created when vinyl-coated fabrics are welded together. The adhesive enables the seam to meet shear forces and load requirements for a structure at all temperatures. The adhesive prevents wicking of moisture into the scrim’s fibers, which also prevents fungal growth or freezing that could affect the exterior coating's adhesion to the scrim. Adhesives are water-based to comply with EPA regulations.

Open-weave scrims generally make the fabric more economical, although this can also depend on the number and type of features that you require in the vinyl. Almost any color, UV resistance vinyl coated polyester, and colorfastness may be incorporated into the vinyl. However, the more features added, the higher the cost of the fabric.

=== Vinyl-coated polyester ===
Vinyl coated polyester is the most frequently used material for flexible fabric structures. It is made up of a polyester scrim, a bonding or adhesive agent, and exterior PVC coatings. The scrim supports the coating (which is initially applied in liquid form) and provides the tensile strength, elongation, tear strength, and dimensional stability of the resulting fabric. Vinyl-coated polyester is manufactured in large panels by heat-sealing an over-lap seam with either a radio-frequency welder or a hot-air sealer. A proper seam will be able to carry the load requirements for the structure. The seam area should be stronger than the original coated fabric when testing for tensile strength.

The base fabric's tensile strength is determined by the size (denier) and strength (tenacity) of the yarns and the number of yarns per linear inch or meter. The larger the yarn and the more yarns per inch, the greater the finished product's tensile strength.

The adhesive agent acts as a chemical bond between the polyester fibers and the exterior coating and also prevents wicking, or fibers absorbing water, which could result in freeze-thaw damage in the fabric.

The PVC coating liquid (vinyl Organisol or Plastisol) contains chemicals to achieve the desired properties of color, water and mildew resistance, and flame retardancy. Fabric can also be manufactured that contains high levels of light transmission or can be made completely opaque. After the coating has been applied to the scrim, the fabric is put through a heating chamber that dries the liquid coating. PVC coatings are available in a range of colors, although non-standard colors can be pricey. Colors may be subject to minimum order runs that allow the coating machine to clear out traces of any previous color.

=== Fiberglass ===
Woven fiberglass coated with PTFE (Teflon or silicone) is also a widely used base material. Glass fibers are drawn into continuous filaments, which are then bundled into yarns. The yarns are woven to form a substrate. The fiberglass carries a high ultimate tensile strength, behaves elastically, and does not suffer from significant stress relaxation or creep. The PTFE coating is chemically inert, can withstand temperatures from 100 °F upwards to 450 °F+. It is also immune to radiation and can be cleaned with water. PTFE fiberglass is additionally Energy Star and Cool Roof Rating Council certified. During scientific tests of its solar properties, it was discovered that PTFE fiberglass membranes reflect as much as 73 percent of the sun’s energy while holding just seven percent on its exterior surface. Certain grades of PTFE fiberglass can absorb 14 percent of the sun’s energy while allowing 13 percent of natural daylight and seven percent of re-radiated energy (solar heat) to transmit through.

Because of its energy efficiency, high melting temperature and lack of creep, fiberglass-based fabrics have been the material of choice for stadium domes and other permanent structures, particularly in the United States. However, when properly constructed, polyester structures may be equally durable.

=== Olefin / polyolefin ===
A number of polymers consisting mainly of polyethylene, polypropylene or combinations of the two are available for fabric structures.

=== PVDF woven ===
PVDF woven fabric are available for fabric structures.

=== ePTFE woven ===
ePTFE woven fabric are available for fabric structures..

=== Blackout fabric ===
Blackout material, also known as blockout material, is an opaque fabric. Blackout fabric consists of a laminate that sandwiches an opaque layer between two white exterior layers. Heating and lighting of a structure may be controlled because the fabric does not allow light to permeate the top or walls. The opaque quality also prevents stains, dirt, repairs, or slightly mismatched panels on the structure's exterior from being noticed from the inside.

== Topcoatings ==
Most fabrics used for fabric structures have some form of topcoating applied to the exterior or coating to make cleaning easier. Topcoating provides a hard surface on the outside of the material, forming a barrier that aids in preventing dirt from sticking to the material, while allowing the fabric to be cleaned with water. As the material ages, the topcoating will eventually erode, exposing the fabric to dirt and making it more difficult to clean. The thicker the topcoating, the longer it will last. However, coatings that are too thick will embrittle and crack when folded.

There are several commonly used topcoatings:

- PVF film lamination is made up of polyvinyl fluoride (commercially known as Tedlar). It consists of a film layer laminated to the PVC fabric during the manufacturing process. The result is a thicker fabric that can resist weather and chemical agents better than competing fabrics. Its self-cleaning ability repels such things as acid rain, graffiti, and bird droppings. Because of these characteristics it can often be found in use in industrialized areas, desert regions, and coastal zones. The thicker coating has a slow erosion rate, resulting in a life expectancy of approximately 25 years depending upon environmental conditions. This topcoating is flexible, which creates a strong and consistent bond to the PVC. PVF coated fabrics may be manufactured in a variety of colors, but are also subject to minimum manufacture runs. PVF coating also makes the fabric non-weldable. Seams are not overlapped, but instead are butted with an extra welded seam, then applied to the underside of the fabric that does not have a topcoating.
- Acrylic topcoating is the most economical and widely available topcoating used. Its spray-on application provides a glossy finish and a resistance to UV degradation. Because the coating is thin, the material is both easy to fabricate and is reparable by high frequency or hot air welding. Depending on environmental conditions, an acrylic topcoating will give the fabric a life span of 10 years or more. Acrylic topcoats are ideal for fabric structures, and can be found on products used as tradeshow pavilions, temporary concert halls, and portable warehouses.
- PVDF topcoating is composed of a mix of fluorine, carbon, and hydrogen. The combination of the fluorine and carbon provides superior resistance to UV degradation and chemical damage than that of the acrylic topcoat. PVDF coated fabrics also maintain color longer than do those coated with acrylic. PVDF fabrics resist algae and fungi, and also have self-cleaning properties that make them easy to maintain. These coated fabrics are flexible, resist cracking, are easily handled, and generally have a life span of 15 to 20 years depending upon environmental conditions. PVDF is chemically grafted to the PVC and polymers used, which reduces the color choices. Because white is the only standard color, other color choices are limited and must be specially manufactured. Because of the chemical properties of the coating, it must be abraded off to expose the PVC before welding. This, too, increases fabrication costs. On site repairs are also difficult, as the membrane must be manually abraded before repair.
- PVDF/PVC topcoating is essentially a dilution of the PVDF topcoat that makes the finished fabric less expensive to manufacture. The finished fabric may be welded without having to abrade the material, which reduces costs. However, because the PVDF is diluted, longevity and the ability to withstand environmental factors are reduced. This results in a general life expectancy of 10 to 15 years. These materials are also available in colors, but are subject to limited manufacturing runs.
- Tio2 (Titanium Dioxide) Top coating "Titan W": TITAN W is a surface finish whose formulation was prepared by Naizil S.p.A. in collaboration with the Chemical Engineering Department of Padua University.

== Fabric properties ==
When discussing fabric properties for use on a structure, there are several terms that are commonly used:

- Tensile strength is a basic indicator of relative strength. It is fundamental for architectural fabrics that function primarily in tension.
- Tear Strength is important in that if a fabric ruptures in place, it generally will do so by tearing. This can occur when a local stress concentration or local damage results in the failure of one yarn, which thereby increases the stress on remaining yarns.
- Adhesion strength is a measure of the strength of the bond between the base material and coating or film laminate that protects it. It is useful for evaluating the strength of welded joints for connecting strips of fabric into fabricated assembly.
- Flame retardancy does not have the same meaning as flameproofing. Fabric that contains a flame-retardant coating can withstand even a very hot point source. However, it can still burn if a large ignition source is present.
- Free Form Tensile fabric allows one to use free form in building construction as it is flexible material.

== Structural properties ==
When deciding on a fabric it is imperative to keep certain fabric properties in mind. These include stress versus strain (unit load versus unit elongation), expected service life, the mechanisms of joining the material together (welding, gluing, etc.), and the fabric’s behavior in or around fire.

Stress versus strain data should be obtained in both uniaxial and biaxial forms. This information characterizes the fabric in terms of stiffness, elasticity, and plasticity. This is essential information when determining the material's response under load in a load-carrying application. Shear strength, shear strain, and Poisson's ratios, though difficult to obtain, are fundamental when analyzing a fabric as a structural material.

== Cost savings of fabric structures ==
There can be multiple advantages to fabric structures over traditional buildings in certain scenarios. In some cases, no lighting is required as the fabric used is generally translucent, which makes it an energy efficient solution. Mobility: You can move them, either on wheels or relocate them completely. Savings: They cost about half of what a traditional structure costs.

Fabric properties: When discussing fabric properties for use on a structure, there are several terms that are commonly used:

Tensile strength is a basic indicator of relative strength. It is fundamental for architectural fabrics that function primarily in tension. Tear Strength is important in that if a fabric ruptures in place, it generally will do so by tearing. This can occur when a local stress concentration or local damage results in the failure of one yarn, which thereby increases the stress on remaining yarns.

Adhesion strength is a measure of the strength of the bond between the base material and coating or film laminate that protects it. It is useful for evaluating the strength of welded joints for connecting strips of fabric into fabricated assembly. Flame retardancy does not have the same meaning as flameproofing. Fabric that contains a flame-retardant coating can withstand even a very hot point source. However, it can still burn if a large ignition source is present.

Of course, other properties must be factored in when determining a material's suitability for a structure. To fully understand a fabric's value and usefulness, consider the following:

- Shading coefficients
- General solar, optical, and thermal performance data
- Acoustical data
- Dimensional stability
- Colorfastness
- Cleanability
- Seam strength and stability
- General handling ability, including abrasion resistance, foldability, etc.

== Gallery ==
Fabric roof in Tulsa, Oklahoma:

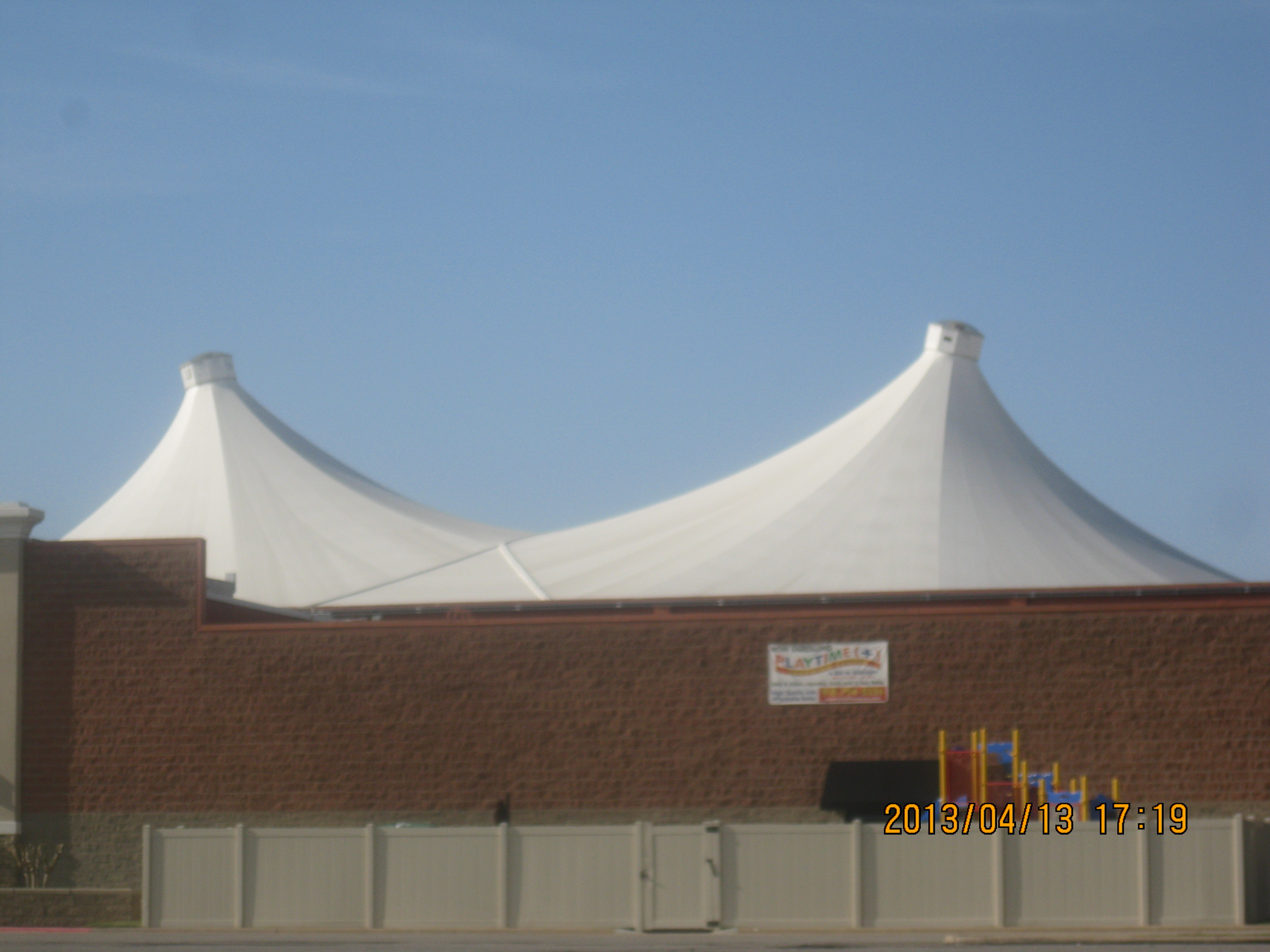

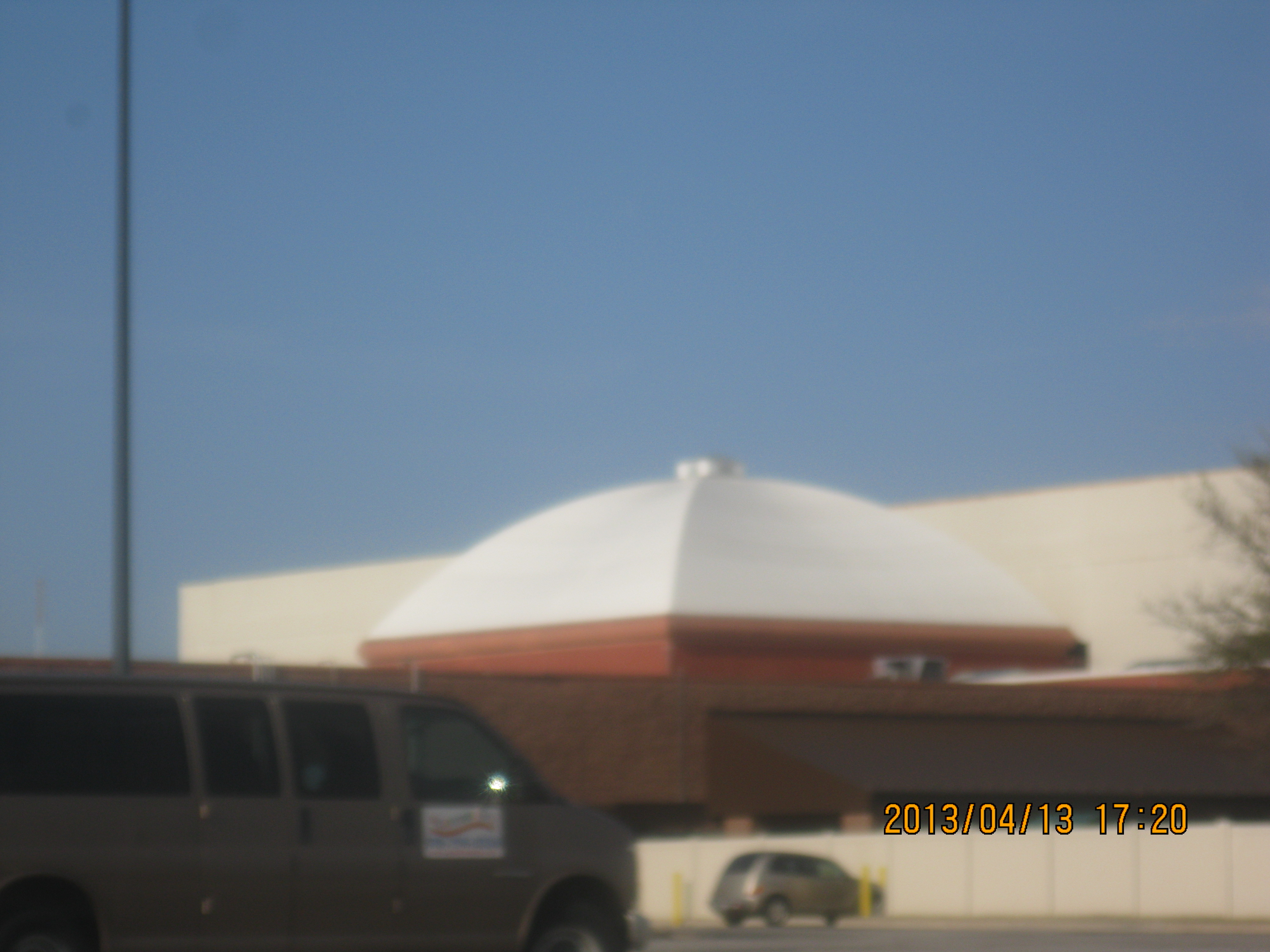

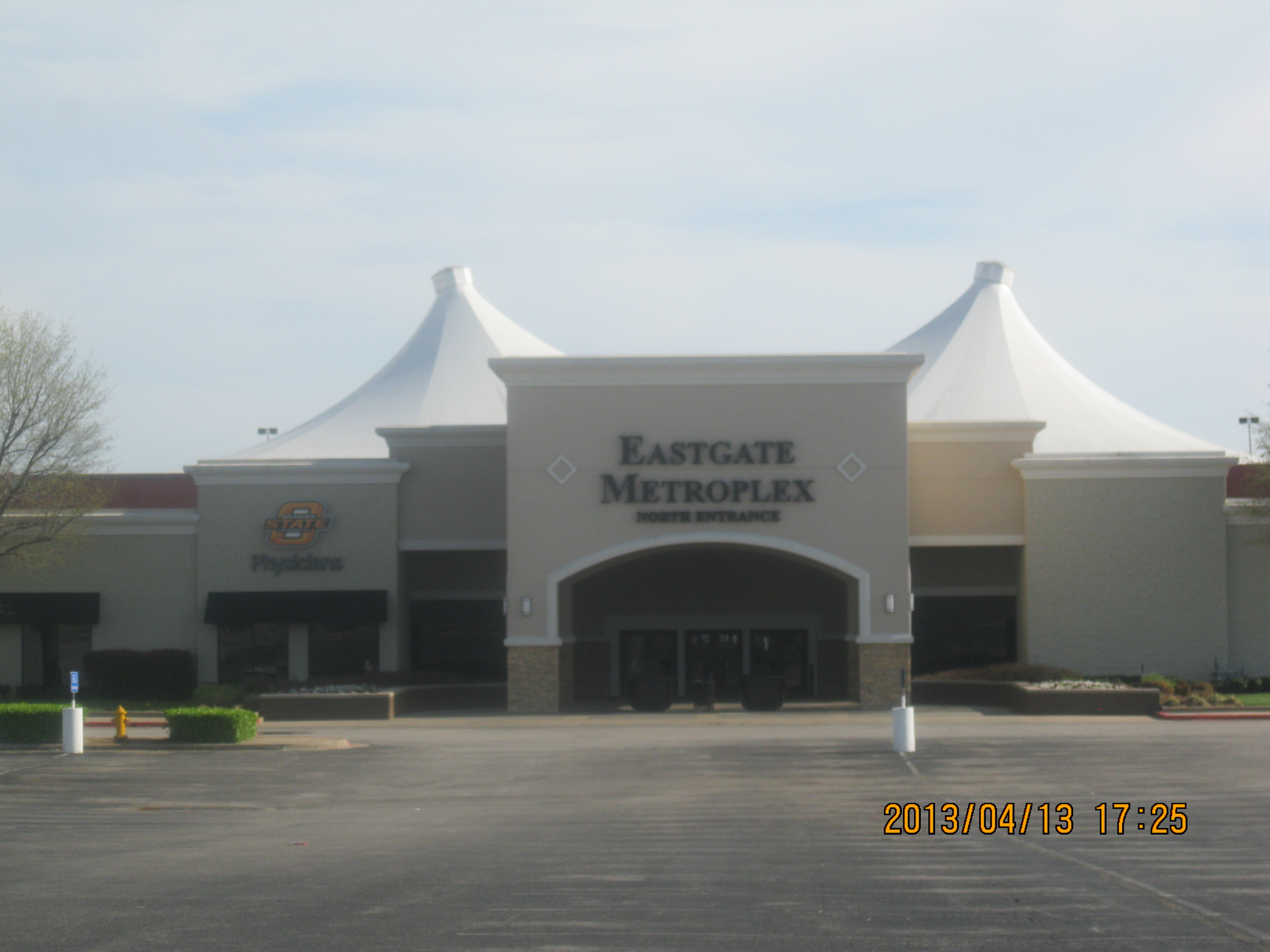

== See also ==
- Tension fabric building
