= E.J. Nutter Training Facility =

College football training facility in Lexington, KY, USA

Coordinates: 38.026854°N 84.500624°W

The E.J. Nutter Training Facility, also called the Nutter Center, is a college football training facility on the University of Kentucky campus built for practice and training of the Kentucky Wildcats football team.

The facility was built to honor Ervin J. Nutter, a UK alumnus from Ohio, who contributed money to build the facility and was active in alumni affairs.
