= Halas Hall =

Building complex in Lake Forest, Illinois

Coordinates: 42.2573°N 87.8951°W

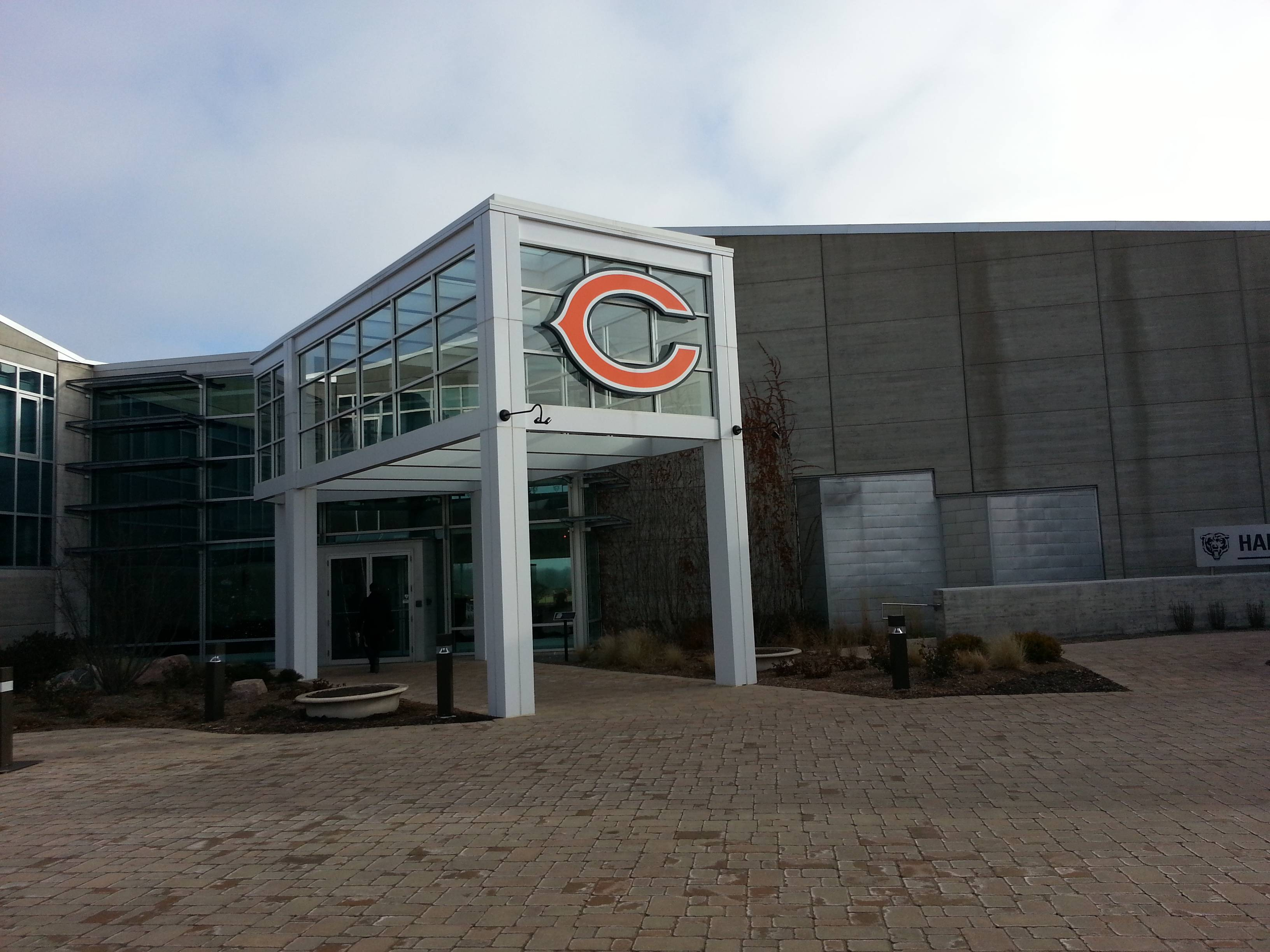
- Halas Hall in 2014
- Interactive map of Halas Hall
- Address: 1920 Football Dr (N Field Dr.); Lake Forest, IL 60045
- Owner: Chicago Bears

Construction
- Opened: March 3, 1997
- Renovated: 2013, 2018
- Construction cost: $20 million ($40.1 million in 2025 dollars)
- Architect: Peter D. Rose (original design); HOK (2018 renovation)

Halas Hall (officially the PNC Center at Halas Hall) is a building complex in Lake Forest, Illinois, that serves as the headquarters of the Chicago Bears of the National Football League (NFL). The 38-acre (15 ha) complex opened on March 3, 1997 and was expanded in 2013 and 2018.

== History ==
=== Background ===
Named after founder George Halas and designed by Peter Rose of Peter Rose + Partners, the building hosts the team's front office, as well as indoor and outdoor practice facilities and cost $20 million.

The location is 4 miles (6.4 km) west of the original Halas Hall which opened in 1977, which was named after George Halas Jr., who died unexpectedly in 1979. It was located at Lake Forest College and contained 2 practice fields (one regulation-size outdoor field as well as a 70-yard practice field) and front office facilities, which is now used by the Foresters Athletics Department. Since 1990 the Bears also leased an indoor 60 by 80 yard practice facility in Waukegan.

=== Renovations ===
In 2013, the Bears announced that Halas Hall would be renovated to include an event center, broadcast studio, outdoor patio, and dining facility, as well as additional conference rooms and staff offices. They also announced that they would expand the parking lot and renovate the entrance to the lobby. The event centers feature interactive digital displays, video monitors and memorabilia such as the Bears' 1963 NFL Championship Game trophy. The new facility was designed by Richard Preves & Associates, PC. On April 21, 2015, PNC Financial Services purchased the naming rights to the new building, naming it the PNC Center at Halas Hall.

On November 17, 2017, Ted Phillips announced the franchise would expand and renovate Halas Hall to effectively double its size. The project was designed by HOK began in March 2018 and concluded in August 2019.

The expanded Halas Hall included: 162,500 square feet (15,100 m^{2}) football operations addition to the existing 143,000 square feet (13,300 m^{2}) facility and a 30,600 square feet (2,840 m^{2}) renovation on the building’s northeast side. A 3,250 square feet (302 m^{2}) players' lounge was created and a 1,700 square feet (160 m^{2}) players locker room. Also, two additional football fields were added, which brought the total to four fields (not including the indoors Walter Payton Center).

After renovations were finished in which training rooms were expanded and new playing fields were added, the Bears moved their training camp to Halas Hall for the 2020 season.

== Features ==
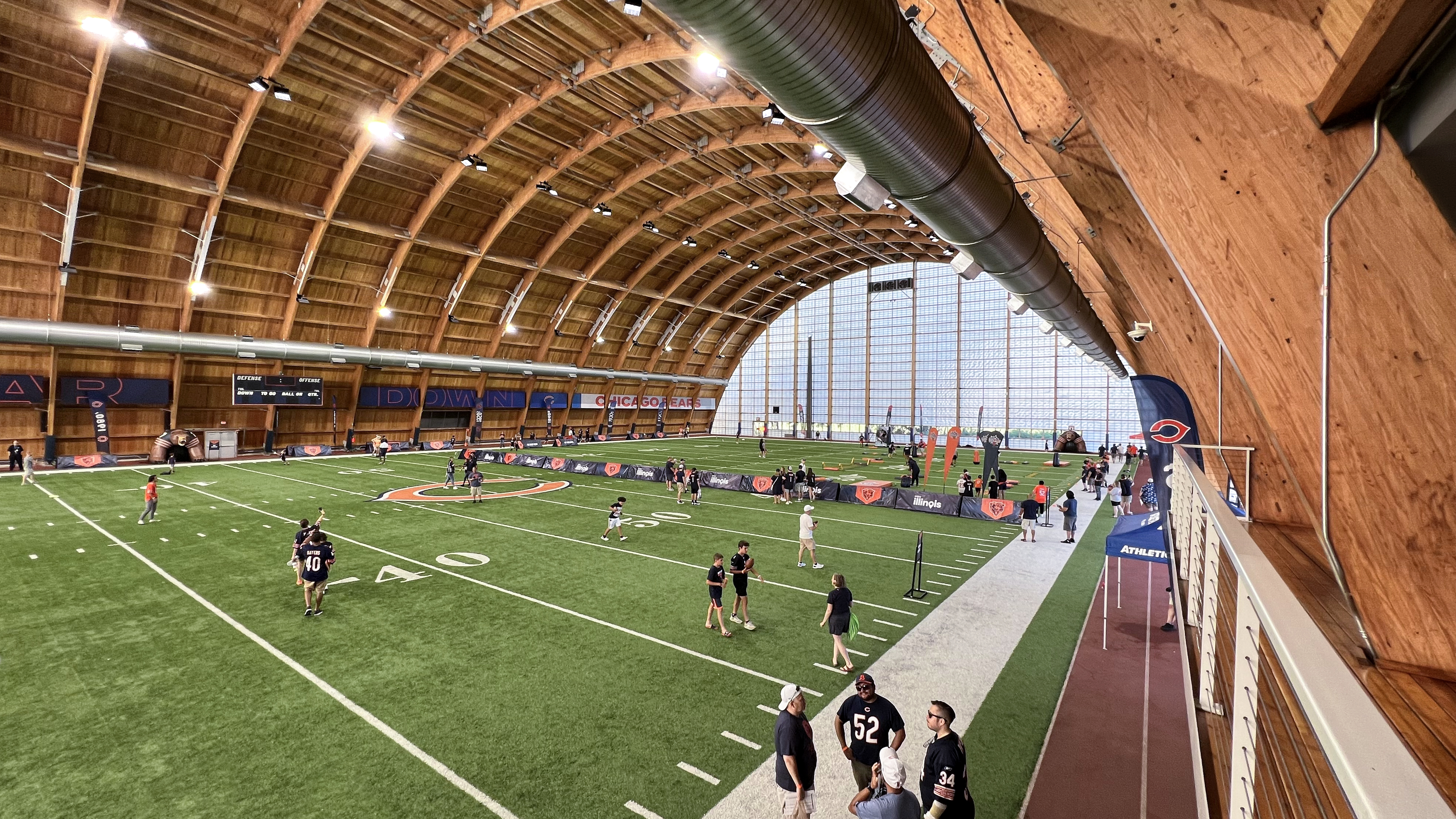
Walter Payton Training Center located within Halas Hall

- Four outdoors practice fields - with approximately 12,000 temporary seats during training camp and a practice 40-person viewing suite for corporate partners in the main field. It also includes a training slope and a storage facility.
- Walter Payton Training Center - an artificial turf indoors practice field with a viewing suite for corporate partners and other VIP guests.
- 13,000 square feet (1,200 m^{2}) Indoor turf space - for training and walkthroughs with a 133x26 video board and adjacent virtual reality room.
- "Mugs" Halas Auditorium - with 130 seats capacity.
- Conference rooms - Halas Hall features 20 conference rooms named after Bears legends and football terminology, such as the Bronko Nagurski Room, Red Grange Room, Brian Piccolo Room, Wrigley Room and Decatur Room.
- Press conference room and media courtyard - A 60 participants conference room plus a work space and office for media members.
- PNC Center - a ballroom that can hold dining events for 120, business meeting for 150 and parties for 200, with adjacent TV production studio.
- Football operations facilities - includes: position meeting rooms, coaches' offices, 3,250 square feet (302 m^{2}) players' lounge and 4,300 square feet (400 m^{2}) team and 7,608 square feet (706.8 m^{2}) staff café with outdoor patio space at a capacity of 100 people.
- Locker rooms - 1,700 square feet (160 m^{2}) players' locker room, separate coaches/scouts locker room and weight room name after former Bears strength coach Clyde Emrich which includes a lap pool.
- Sports medicine space - including two hydrotherapy pools, two plunge pools, a float pod, sauna and steam room.
- Event center - features Chicago Bears themed memorabilia and players exhibits, such as the 1985 Lombardi Trophy and 1963 Championship Trophy.
- A 1.5-mile (2.4 km) running and cycling path and a racquetball and basketball courts.
