= Geiger Engineers =

American structural engineering firm

- Company type: Private company
- Industry: Structural Engineering
- Founded: 1988
- Headquarters: Suffern, New York
- Key people: Karen A. Lynch, P.E. (Principal, President); David M. Campbell, P.E. (Principal, CEO Emeritus); Paul A. Gossen, P.E., F.ASCE (Principal Emeritus); Stephen P. Emery, P.E. (Principal); Timothy D. Mills (Principal ) Eric E. Dahl, P.E. (Principal); Dorota Rogulska (Principal)
- Services: Consulting; Tensile Membrane Structures; Long Span Structures; Sports Facilities; Retractable Roofs; Entertainment Engineering
- Website: www.geigerengineers.com

Geiger Engineers is the doing business name of Geiger Lynch Emery Campbell Engineers, P.C., an American structural engineering consulting firm located northwest of New York City. Founded in 1988 by David H. Geiger, Paul A. Gossen, Kris P. Hamilton, David D. Chen, David M. Campbell, and Mike Liao, the company has worked on large projects throughout the world. Starting from long span and tensile membrane structures, Geiger Engineers has branched out over the years into a range of specialties from designing sports facilities to providing engineering services for the entertainment industry.

Recent high-profile projects include the new roof on the JMA Dome (formerly the Carrier Dome) at Syracuse University, winner of NCSEA's 2021 Excellence in Structural Engineering Award for Forensic/Renovation/Retrofit/Rehabilitation Structures over $20 Million; the Credit One Stadium renovations, new Stage House and canopy; the USTA's Louis Armstrong Stadium which was a finalist in the SEAoNY 2020 Excellence in Structural Engineering (EiSE) Awards; and Ariens Hill at Titletown, winner of the ASLA 2019 Wisconsin Award and the AIA 2018 Michigan Building Award, among others.

In addition to providing a wide range of engineering services, Geiger Engineers remains involved in industry innovations. For example, Tensotherm (trademark) - a composite fabric insulated with Lumira aerogel - was developed by Cabot Corporation, Birdair, and Geiger Engineers. In 2008 it was used for the first time on the Dedmon Athletic Center’s new roof.

More recently, Geiger developed a nonlinear bearing for large moveable structures such as retractable roofs. This now patented nonlinear bearing is an improvement on the commonly used linear bearing in that it can combine rotation and translation in varying ways, giving structural designers greater flexibility.

== History ==
In 1968 while David Geiger was an adjunct professor at Columbia University with a part-time practice, he was contacted by Davis-Brody, a New York architectural firm. With their design of a 30-story tall, air-supported fabric structure, Davis-Brody had won the design competition for the U.S. exhibition hall at Expo '70 in Osaka, Japan. They needed a structural engineer with the expertise to implement their design and they turned to Dr. Geiger. In order to meet the lower than expected budget passed by Congress, Geiger changed the design and invented the low profile cable-restrained air-supported roof. The success of the Osaka Pavilion led to a surge in the design and construction of air-supported roofs.

During the Osaka project, Horst Berger joined Geiger and their firm became Geiger Berger Associates which remained central to the new-found interest in utilizing air-supported roofs. Eight stadia were built with air-supported roofs in the U.S. during the 1970s and early 1980s with Geiger Berger Associates as the structural engineers for all of them.

As important as the air-supported roof projects, was Geiger Berger's work in pioneering long-span cable, tensile membrane, and tensegrity structures. Among the notable structures engineered by Geiger Berger are the tensile membrane Hajj Terminal which in 2010 won the AIA 25-Year Award; the first tensegrity type dome which was built for the Olympic Gymnastics Venue in Seoul, Korea; and the world's first translucent insulated fabric roof for the Talisman Centre (now the MNP Community & Sport Centre), in Calgary, Alberta, Canada. In addition, Geiger Berger was involved in the development of structural fabric materials such as Teflon PTFE coated fiberglass.

By the early 1980s, the partnership between David Geiger and Horst Berger began to break apart and in 1983 Geiger Berger Associates again became Geiger Associates upon the departure of Berger. Geiger Associates was bought by KKBN in 1986. In 1988, the year before he died, David Geiger and his associates Kris Hamilton, David Chen, Paul Gossen, David Campbell, and Mike Liao founded Geiger Engineers with a group of other former colleagues from Geiger Associates.

== Notable projects ==
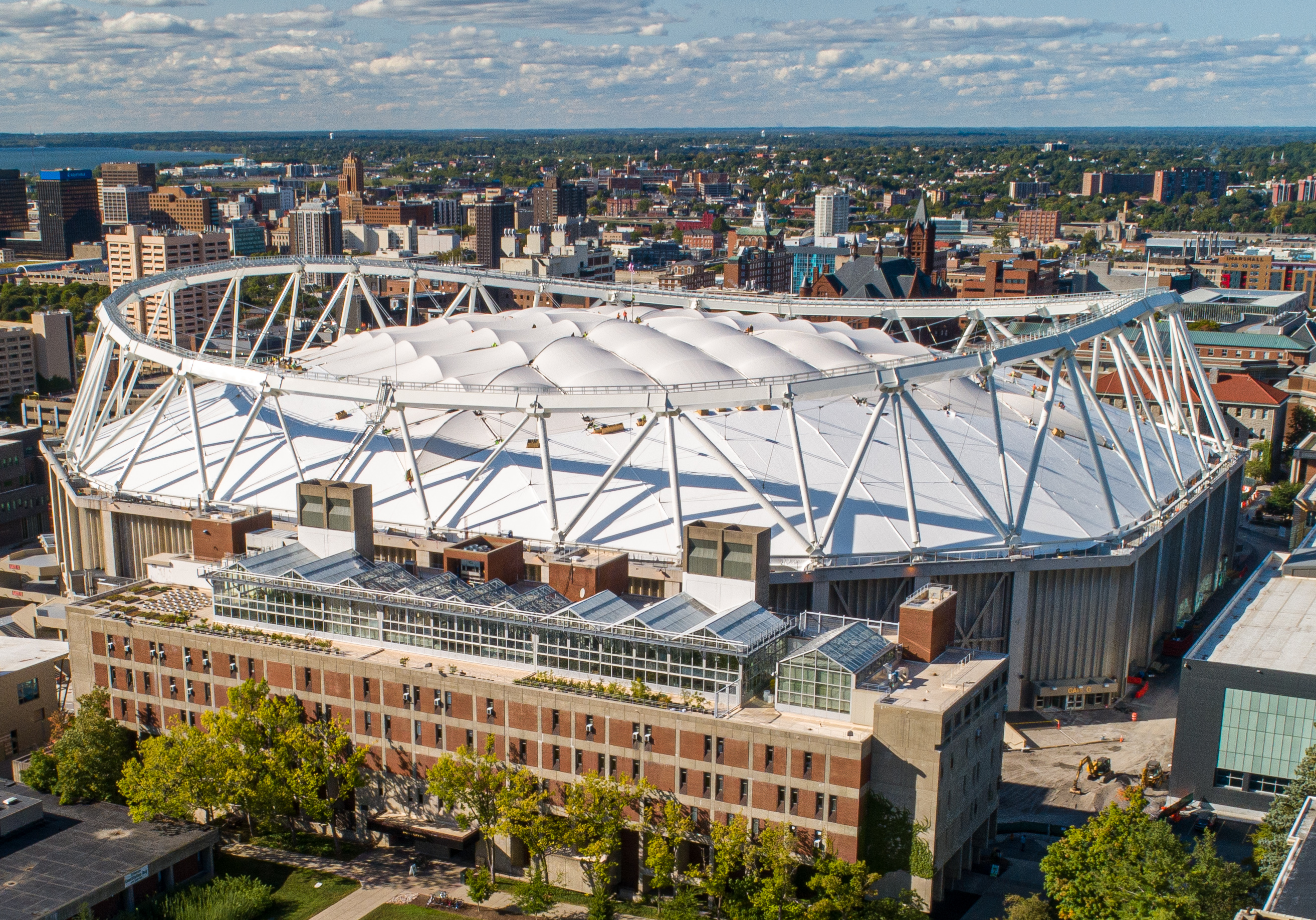
Syracuse University JMA Dome (Photo: Jimhoward03)

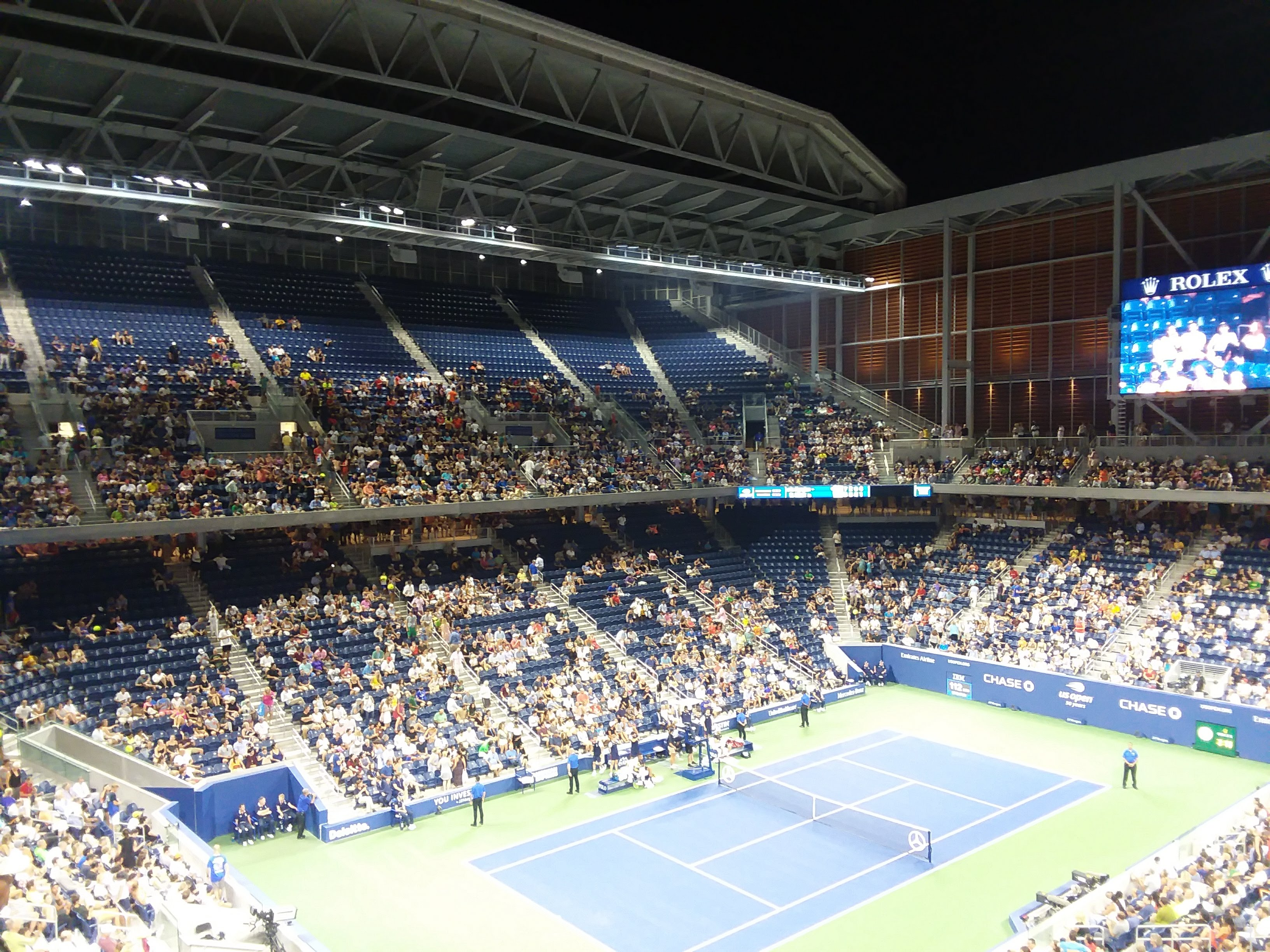
Louis Armstrong Stadium interior, retractable roof open (Photo: G. Capo)

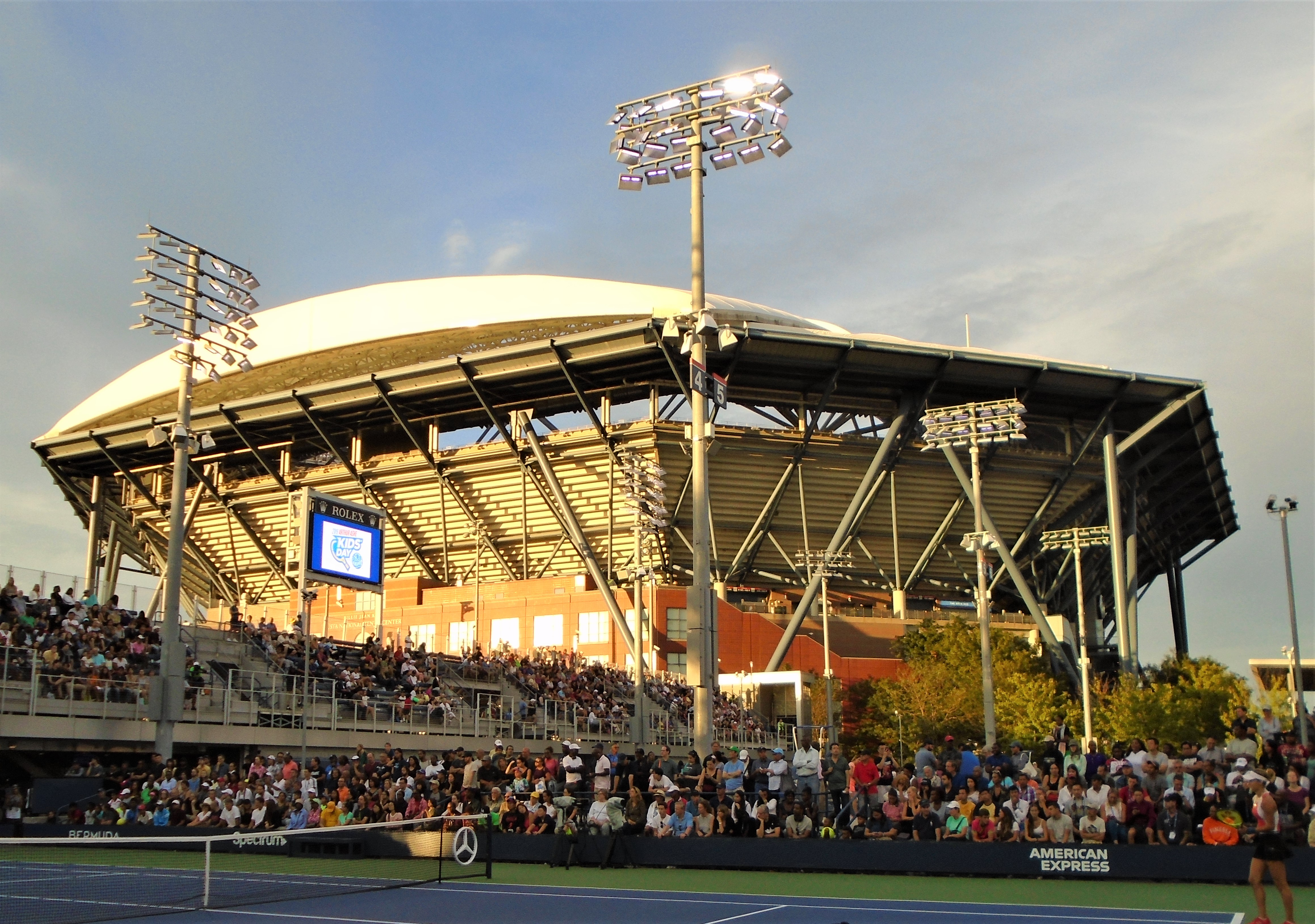
Arthur Ashe Stadium with new roof (Photo: Beyond My Ken)

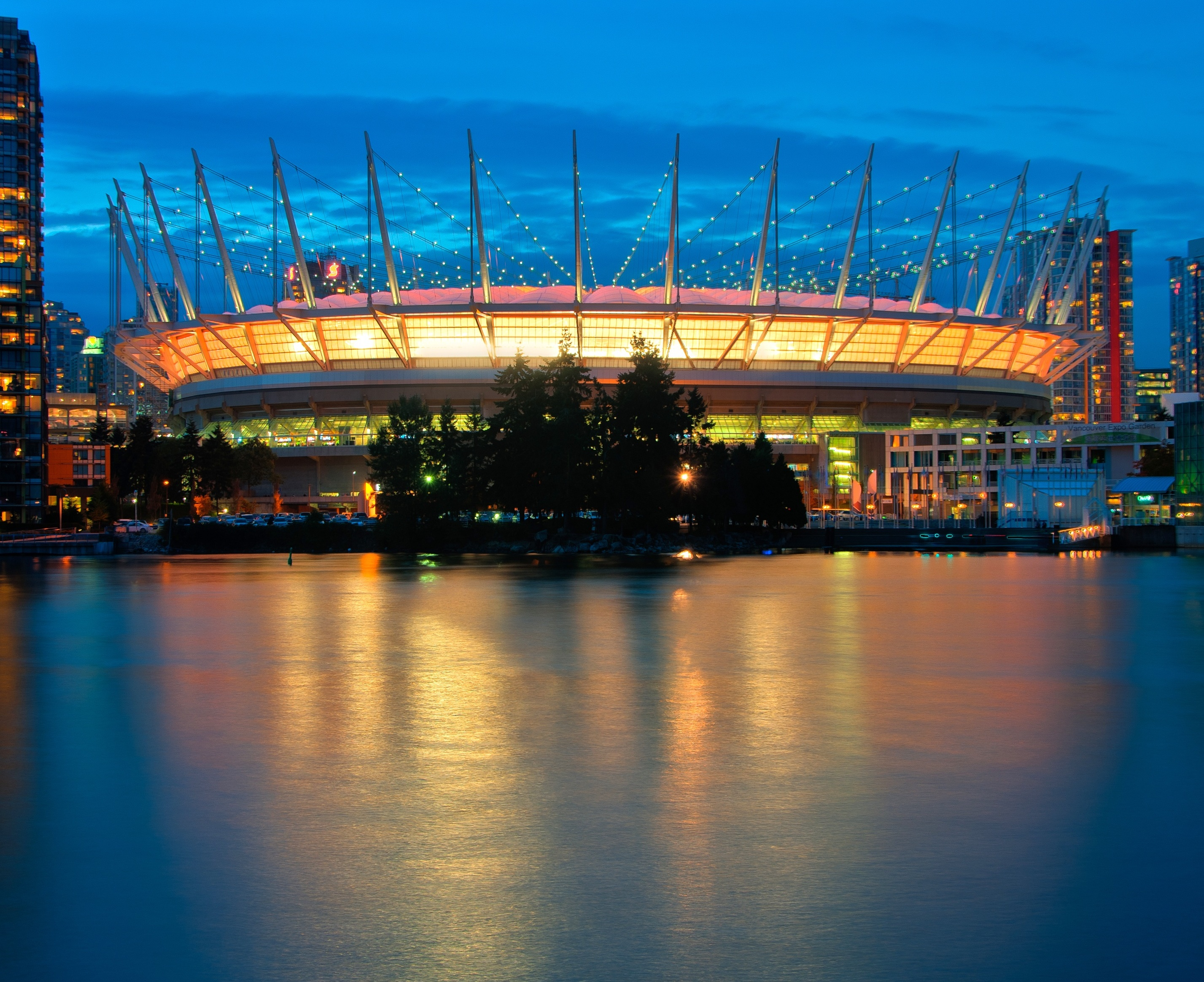
New Roof on BC Place (Photo: Yvrphoto)

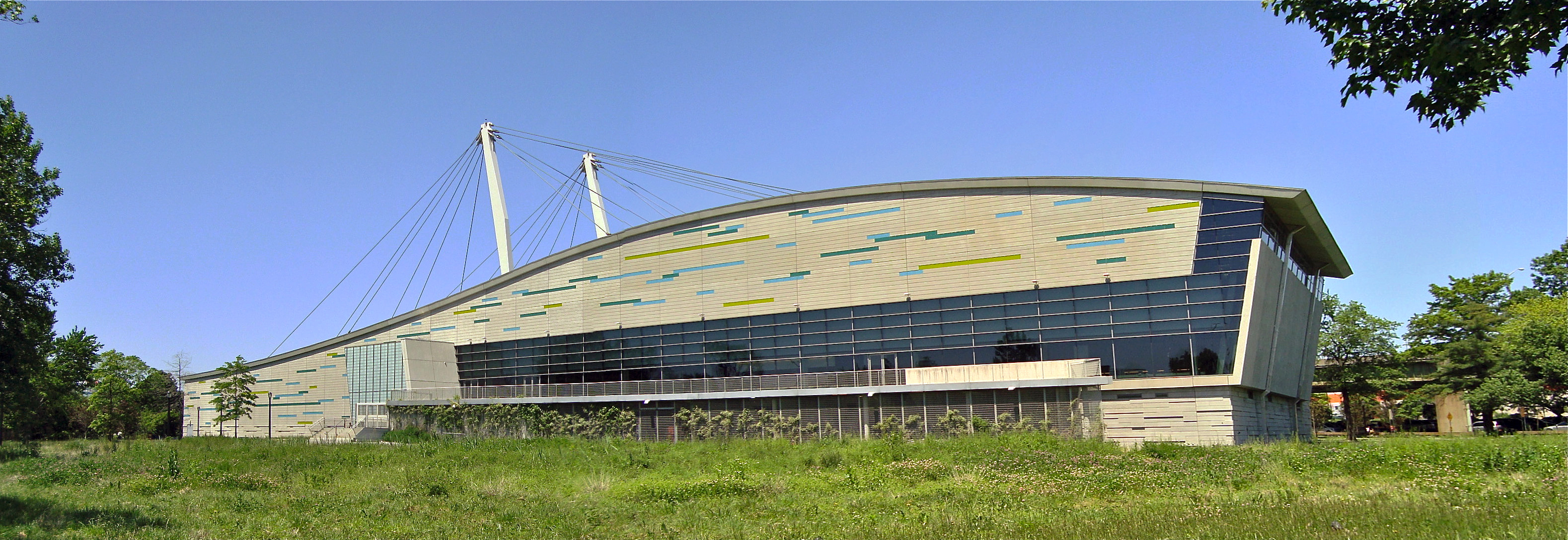
Flushing Meadows-Corona Park Pool and Rink (Photo: JChenK)

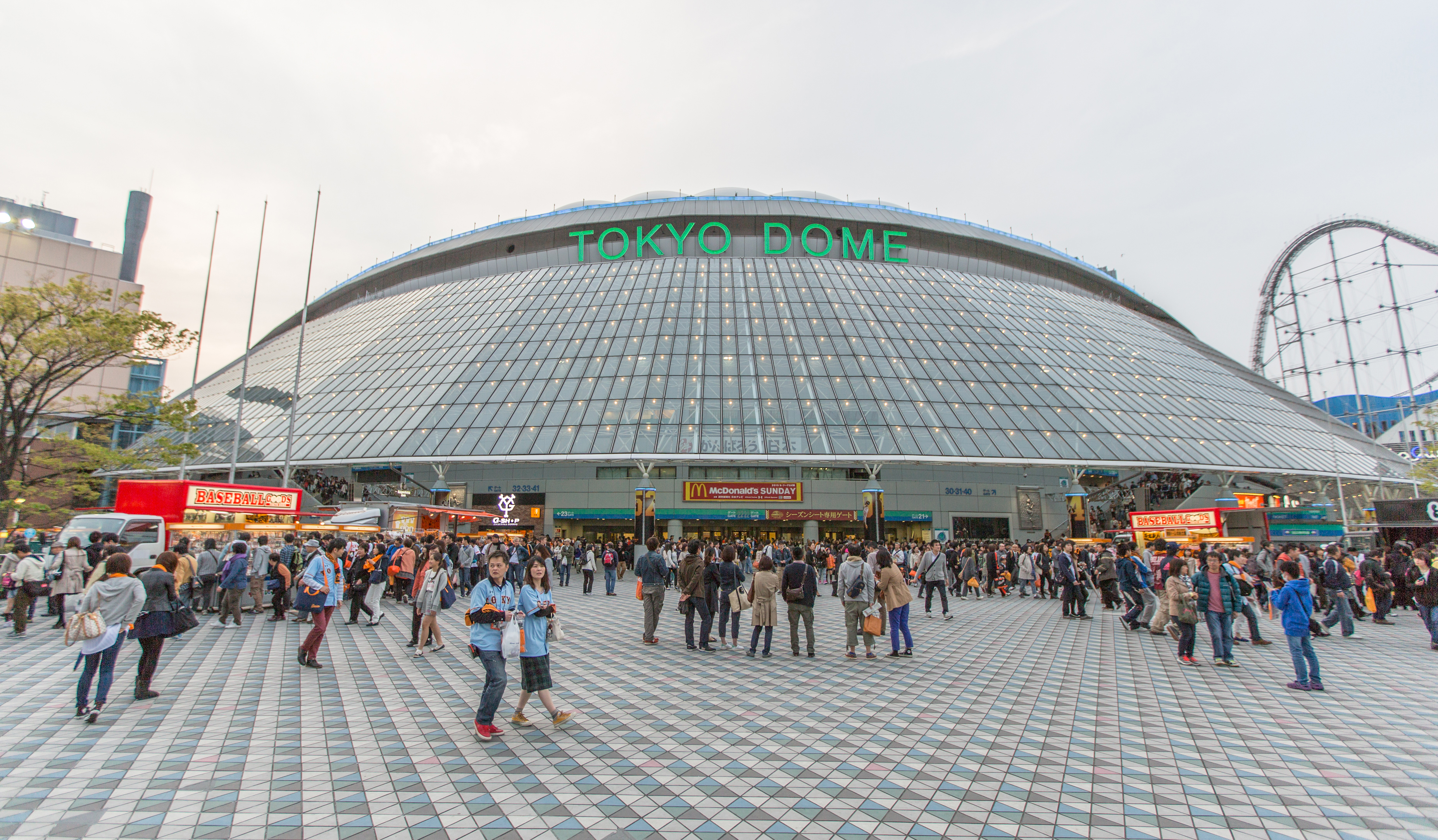
Tokyo Dome (Photo: IQRemix)

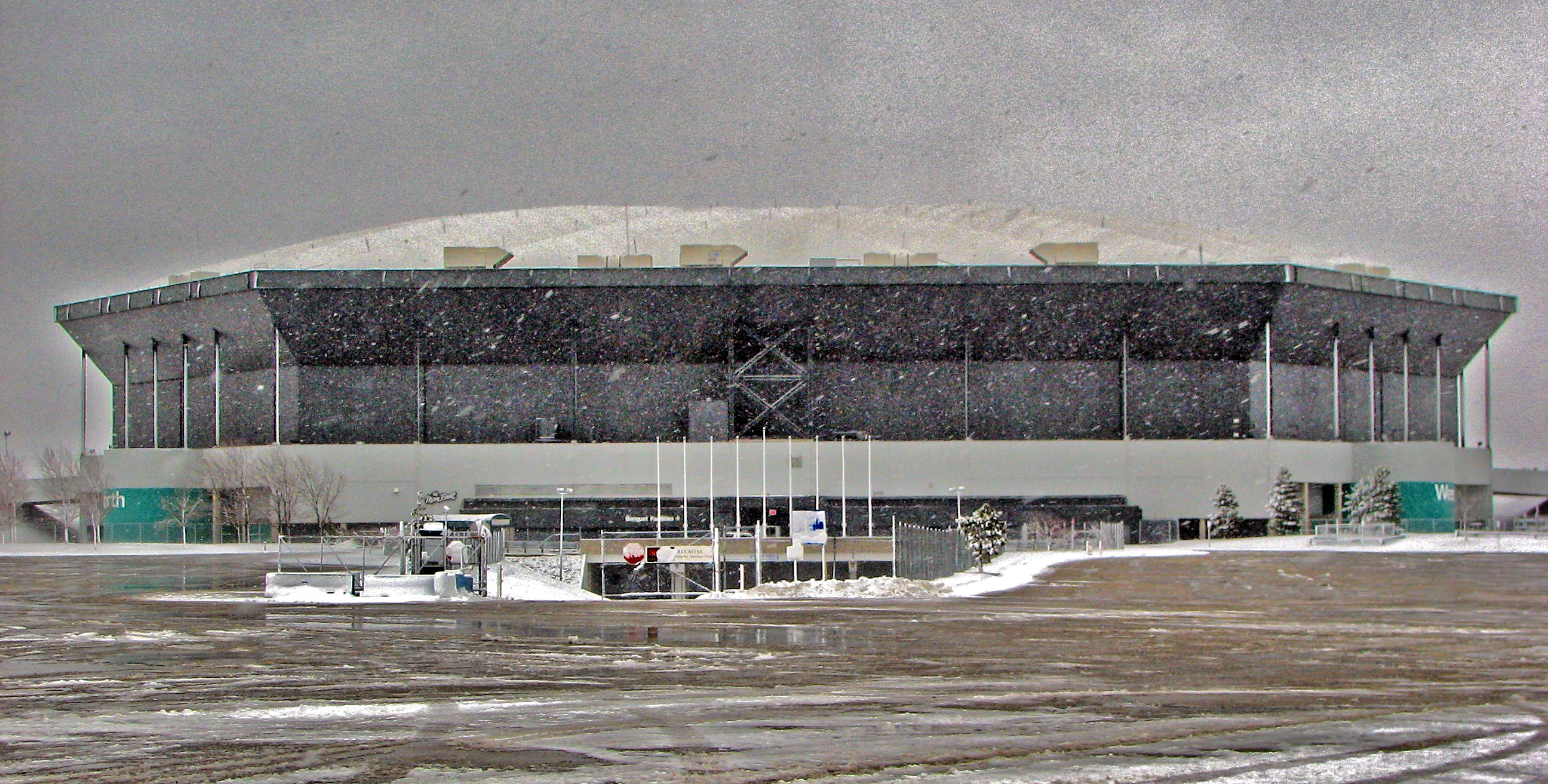
Pontiac Silverdome (Photo: Dave Hogg, Royal Oak, MI, USA)

=== Sports facilities and convention centers ===
- Louis Armstrong Stadium, USTA Billie Jean King National Tennis Center, Queens, New York, U.S.
- U.S. Bank Stadium - Snow Catchment Walls, Minneapolis, Minnesota, U.S.
- Flushing Meadows-Corona Park Pool and Rink, Queens, New York, U.S.
- TD Arena, College of Charleston, Charleston, South Carolina, U.S.
- Athletic and Wellness Center, SUNY at New Paltz, New Paltz, New York, U.S.
- Resch Center Arena, Green Bay, Wisconsin, U.S.
- Grand Casino Arena, St. Paul, Minnesota, U.S.
- Lenovo Center, Raleigh, NC, U.S.
- Simmons Bank Arena (formerly Verizon Arena and Alltel Arena), Little Rock, Arkansas, U.S.
- Bon Secours Wellness Arena (formerly the Bi-Lo Center), Greenville, South Carolina, U.S.
- Icahn Stadium, Randall's Island, New York, New York, U.S.
- Myao Li Arena, Myao Li County, Taiwan, R.O.C.

=== Renovations and expansions ===
- Credit One Stadium, New Stage House with Canopy, Additional Seating, New Entrance; Daniel Island, Charleston, South Carolina, U.S.
- JMA Dome (formerly Carrier Dome), New Roof, Syracuse University, Syracuse, New York, U.S.
- Arthur Ashe Stadium, New Retractable Roof, USTA Billie Jean King National Tennis Center, Queens, New York, U.S.
- BC Place Stadium Revitalization, New Roof, Vancouver, British Columbia, Canada
- Hubert H. Humphrey Metrodome Roof Replacement, Minneapolis, Minnesota, U.S.
- Canada Harbour Place, Fabric Roof Replacement, British Columbia Trade & Convention Centre, Vancouver, British Columbia, Canada
- Dedmon Center Roof Replacement, Radford University, Radford, Virginia, U.S.
- Littlejohn Coliseum Renovation, Clemson University, Clemson, South Carolina, U.S.
- Purcell Pavilion at the Joyce Center, University of Notre Dame, Notre Dame, Indiana, U.S.
- USTA National Tennis Center, Stadium 3 Renovation, Queens, New York, U.S.

=== Entertainment and recreation projects ===
- Brooklyn Mirage, outdoor live music venue, Brooklyn, New York, U.S.
- Metropolitan Museum of Art, About Time: Fashion and Duration Installation, New York, New York, U.S.
- MGM National Harbor, Seasonal Decor Installations, Oxon Hill, Maryland, U.S.
- Centerhung LED Scoreboard (Main Videoboard), Golden1 Center, Sacramento, California, U.S.
- Sami Family Amphitheater, Zoo Miami, Miami, Florida, U.S.
- Lyric Theater, modular stage apron, New York, New York, U.S.
- Marvel Experience, touring interactive show in air-inflated domes, various cities, U.S.
- NBC's Million Second Quiz, prime-time outdoor stage structure and set, New York, New York, U.S.
- 150th Cinco de Mayo Celebration outdoor stage and set, Puebla, Puebla, Mexico
- Halo for 2011 Pan American Games Opening Ceremonies, Omnilife Stadium, Guadalajara, Jalisco, Mexico
- Spider-Man: Turn Off the Dark, New York, New York, U.S.
- Stage Lifts, Le Rêve's "aqua" theater, Wynn Casino, Las Vegas, Nevada, U.S.
- Aria Pool Deck Structures, Aria Resort & Casino, Las Vegas, Nevada, U.S.
- Conference Table in the Sky, Butler Amusements, Fairfield, California, U.S.
- Large onstage tilting turntable for LA Opera, Los Angeles, California, U.S.
- Wrestlemania XXVI, Phoenix, Arizona, U.S.
- Wrestlemania XXIV, Orlando, Florida, U.S.

=== Tensile Membrane ===
- Allianz Field, Fabric Facade, Saint Paul, Minnesota
- Memorial Square at Meridian Place, Stage Canopy, Barrie, Ontario, Canada
- Skyline, Station Canopies, Honolulu, Hawaii, U.S.
- Raleigh-Durham International Airport, Parking Structures, Raleigh, North Carolina, U.S.
- Jacobs Pavilion, Nautica Entertainment Complex, Cleveland, Ohio, U.S.
- Florida Festival Seaworld (as Geiger Berger Associates), Orlando, Florida, U.S.
- Gran Telescopio Milimetrico Alfonso Serrano, Cupula Rotatario, Cerro La Negra, Puebla, Mexico
- Hajj Terminal at New Jeddah International Airport (as Geiger Berger Associates), Jeddah, Saudi Arabia
- Ja-Yi Sports Gymnasium, Ja-Yi, Taiwan, R.O.C.
- Canada Harbour Place, Exhibit Hall Roof, British Columbia Trade & Convention Centre (as Geiger Associates, Ltd), Vancouver, British Columbia, Canada
- 2002 World Cup Main Stadium, Seoul, Korea
- Dean Smith Center, Chapel Hill, North Carolina, U.S.

=== Domes (primarily as Geiger Berger Associates) ===
- 1988 Summer Olympics venues in Seoul, Korea

- Olympic Weightlifting Gymnasium
- Olympic Fencing Gymnasium (renamed the SK Olympic Handball Gymnasium in 2012)
- Olympic Gymnastics Arena

- BC Place, Vancouver, British Columbia, Canada
- JMA Wireless Dome (formerly the Carrier Dome), Syracuse University, Syracuse, New York, U.S.
- Hubert H. Humphrey Metrodome, Minneapolis, Minnesota, U.S.
- MNP Community & Sport Centre (originally the Lindsay Park Sports Centre), Calgary, Alberta, Canada
- RCA Dome (originally the Hoosier Dome), Indianapolis, Indiana, U.S.
- Redbird Arena, Normal, Illinois, U.S.
- UNI-Dome, Cedar Falls, Iowa, U.S.
- Pontiac Silverdome, Pontiac, Michigan, U.S.
- Stephen C. O'Connell Center or the O'Dome, University of Florida, Gainesville, Florida, U.S.
- Tokyo Dome, Tokyo, Japan
- Tropicana Field (originally the Florida Suncoast Dome), St. Petersburg, Florida, U.S.

=== Center Hung Scoreboards and LED Structures ===
- Center Hung Scoreboard - KeyBank Center, Buffalo, New York, U.S.
- Center Hung Scoreboard - PPG Paints Arena, Pittsburgh, Pennsylvania, U.S.
- Center Hung Scoreboard - Golden1Center, Sacramento, California, U.S.

== Gallery ==
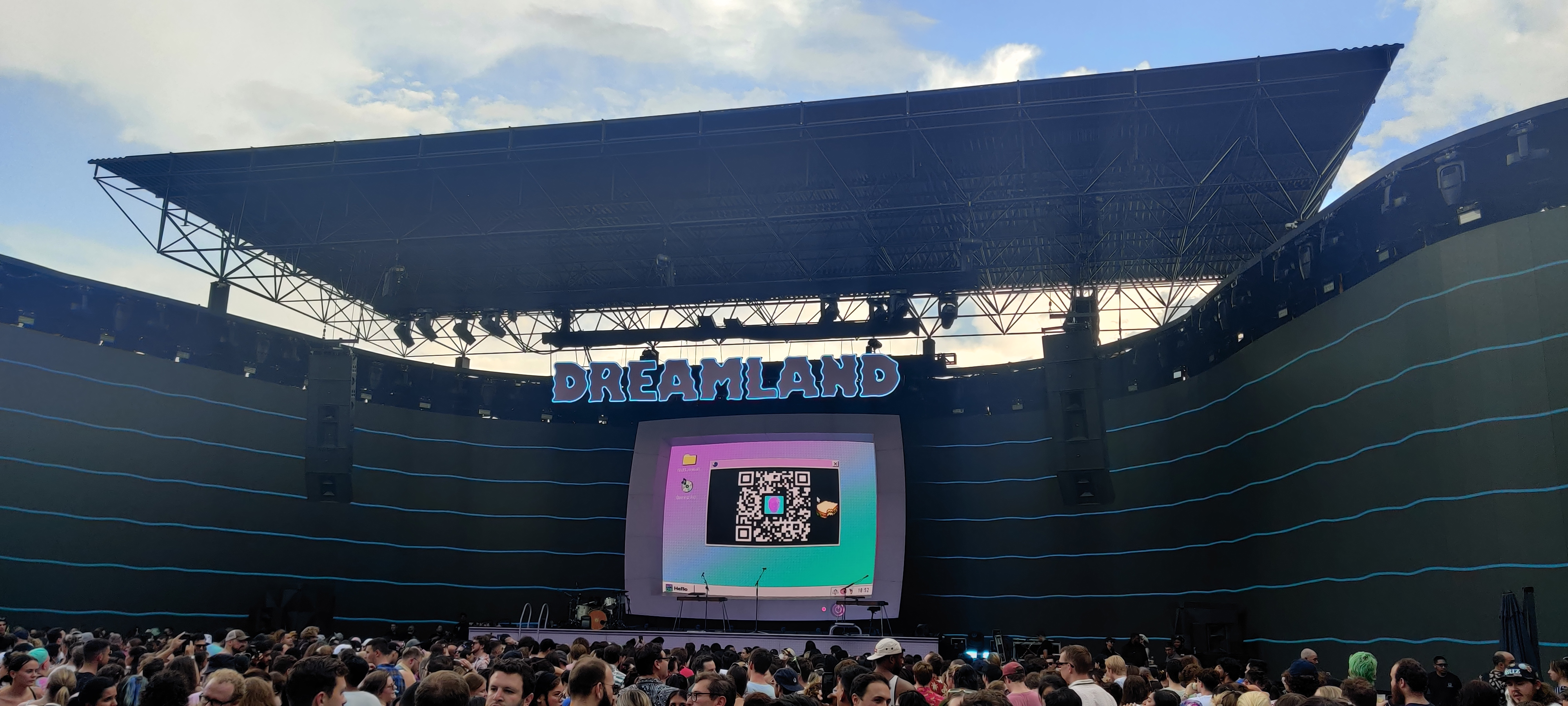
Brooklyn Mirage, Brooklyn, NY (Photo: Legoktm)

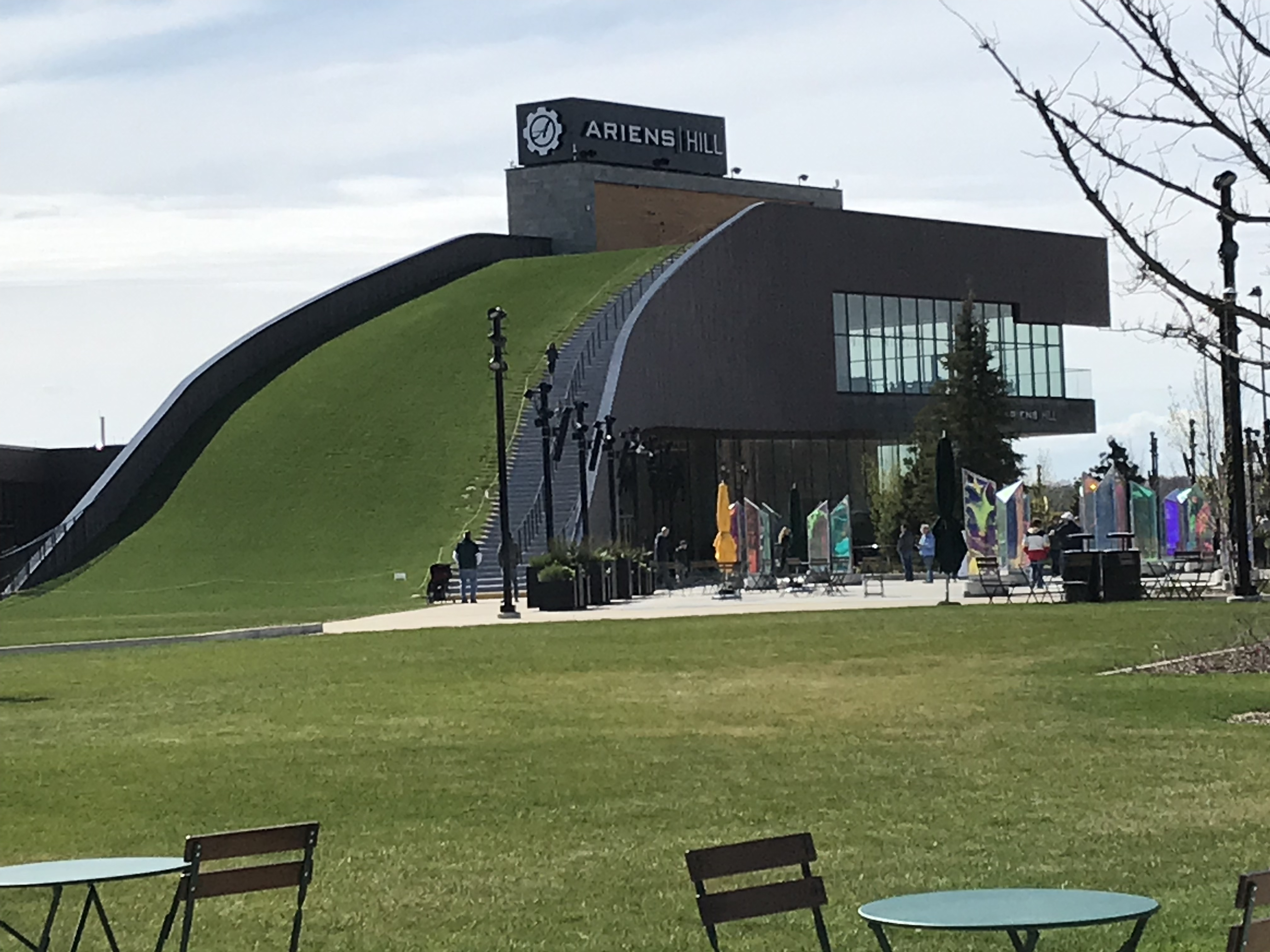
Ariens Hill, Titletown District, Greenbay, WI (Photo: Wilsome429)

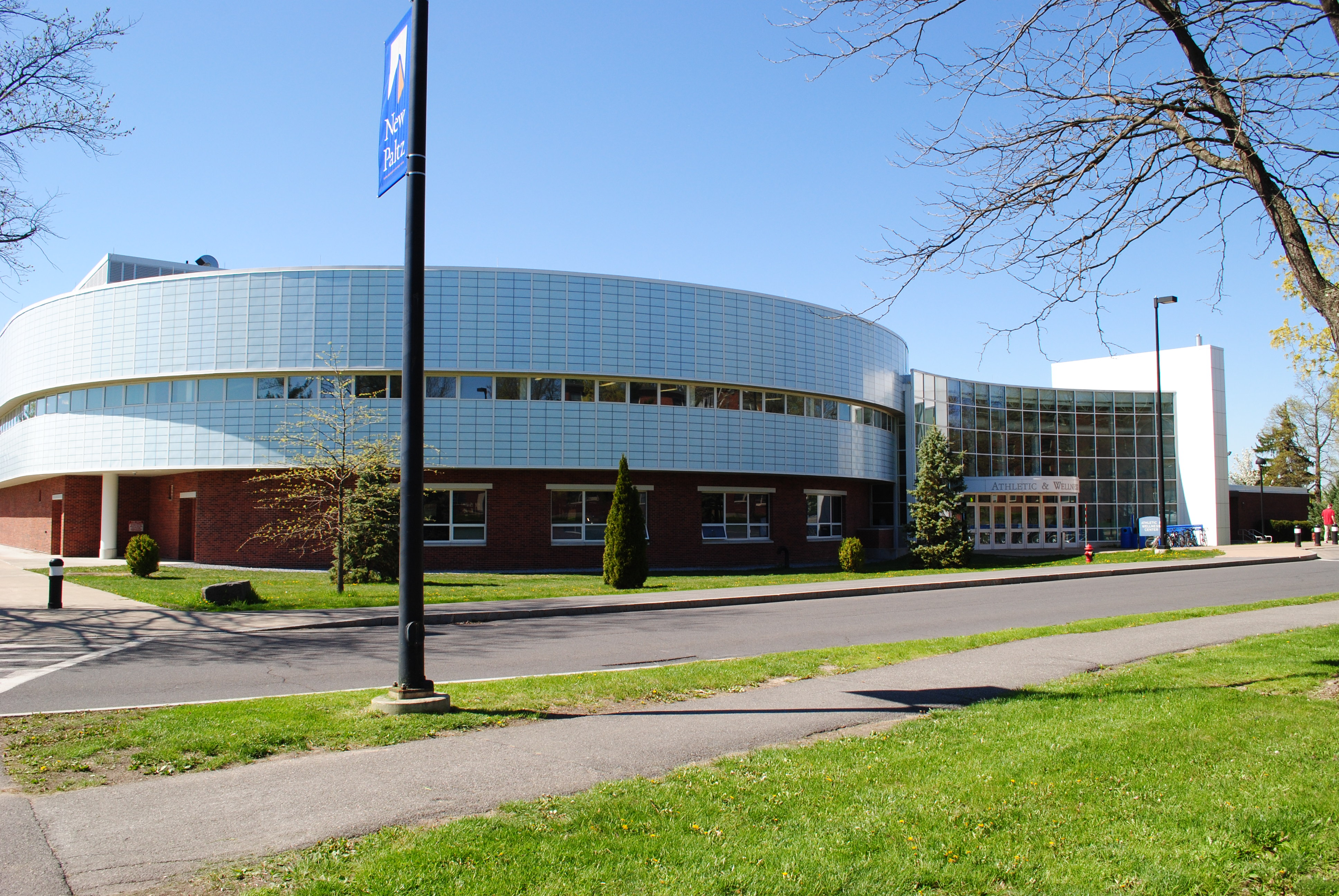
Athletic and Wellness Center at SUNY New Paltz, New Paltz, NY (Photo: crz4mets2)

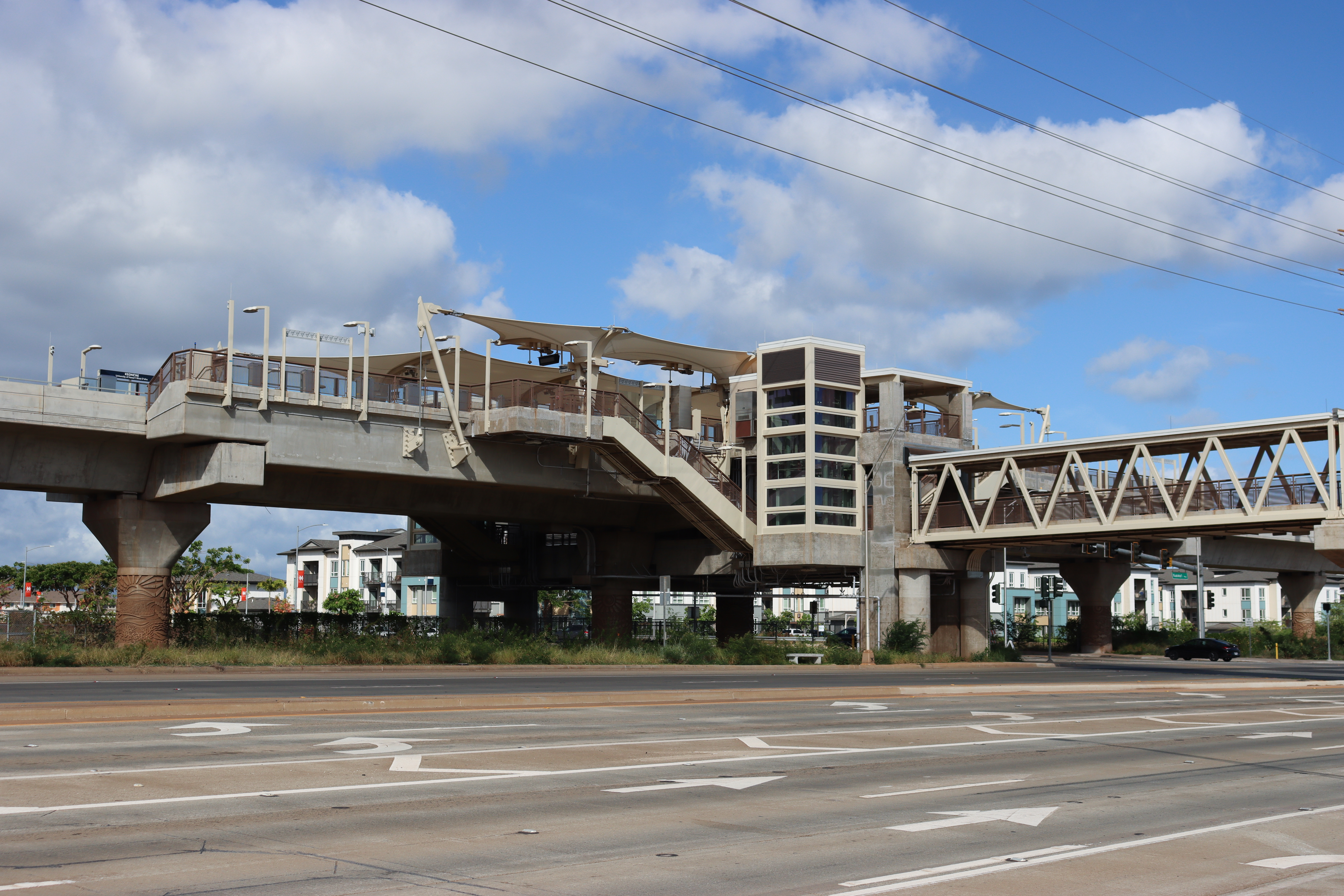
Skyline Keoneae Station fabric canopies, Honolulu, HI (Photo: Musashi1600)

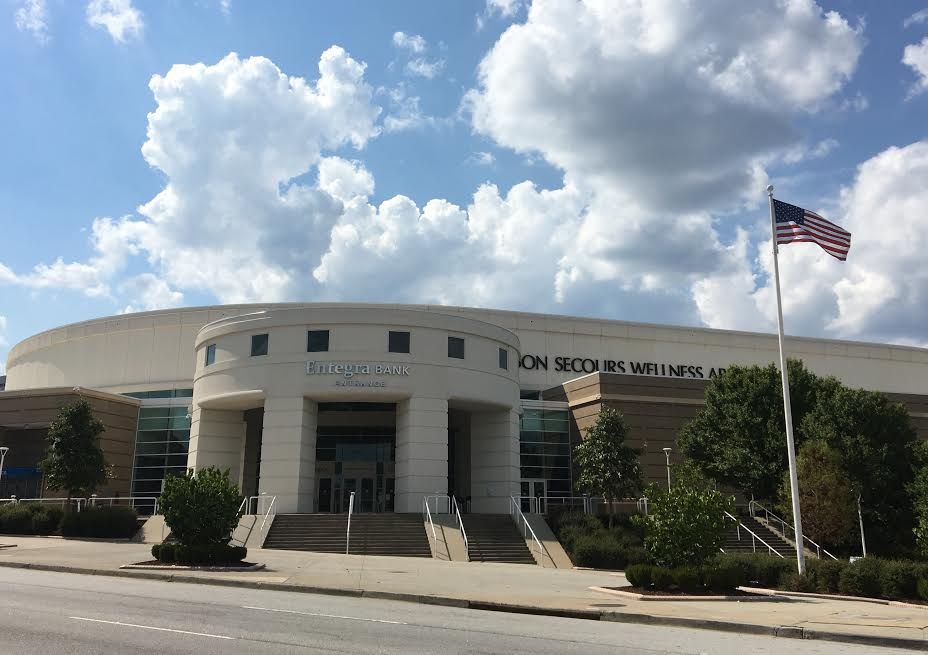
Bon Secours Wellness Arena, Greenville, SC (Photo: Excel23)

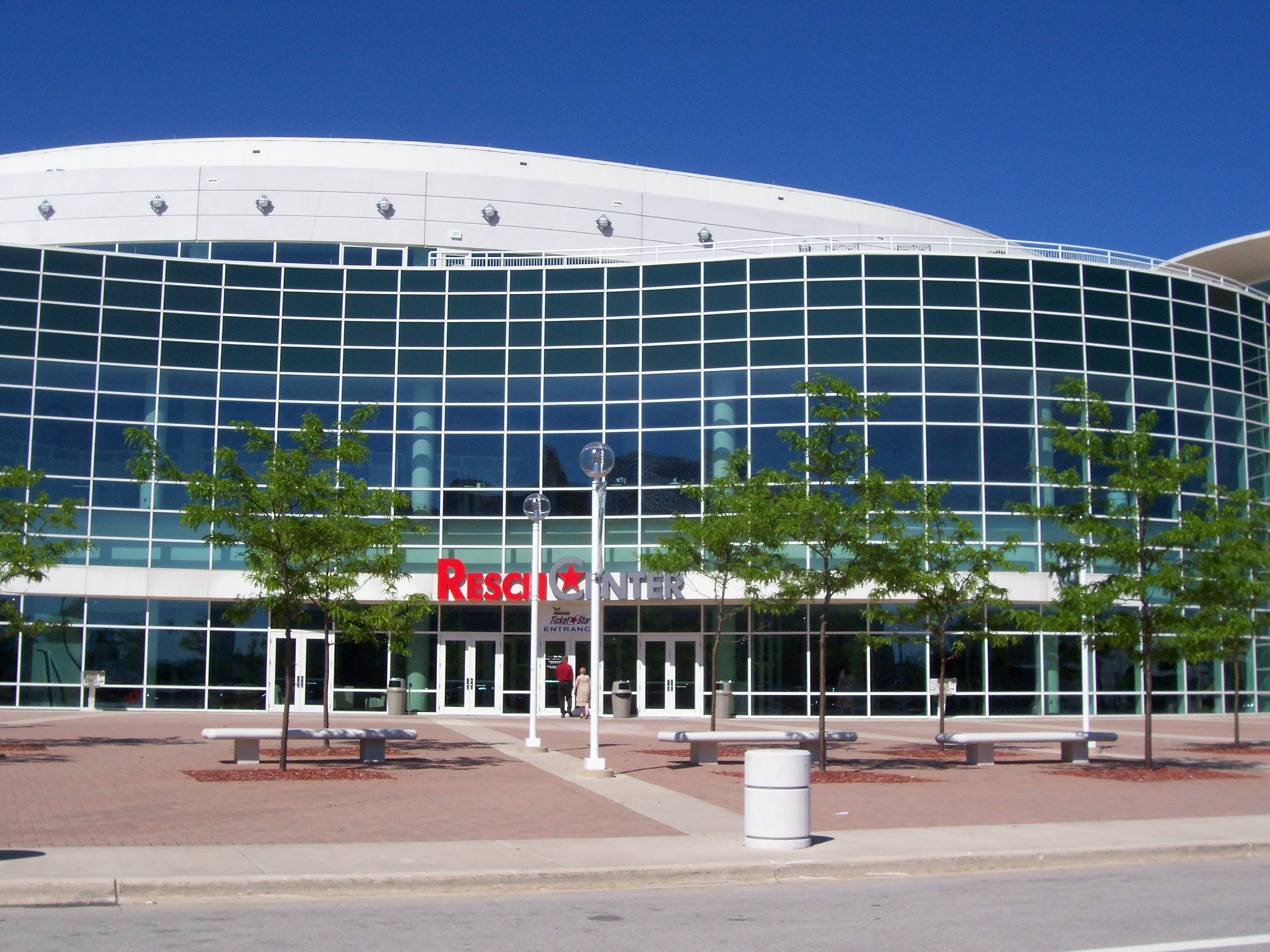
Resch Center (Photo: Royalbroil)

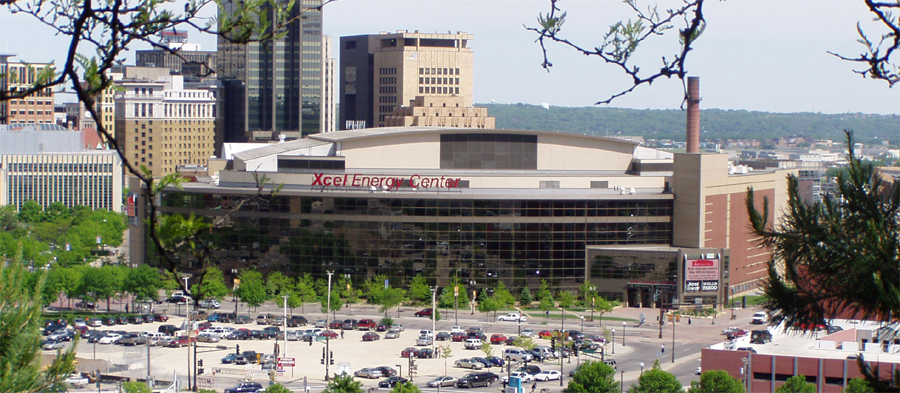
Grand Casino Arena

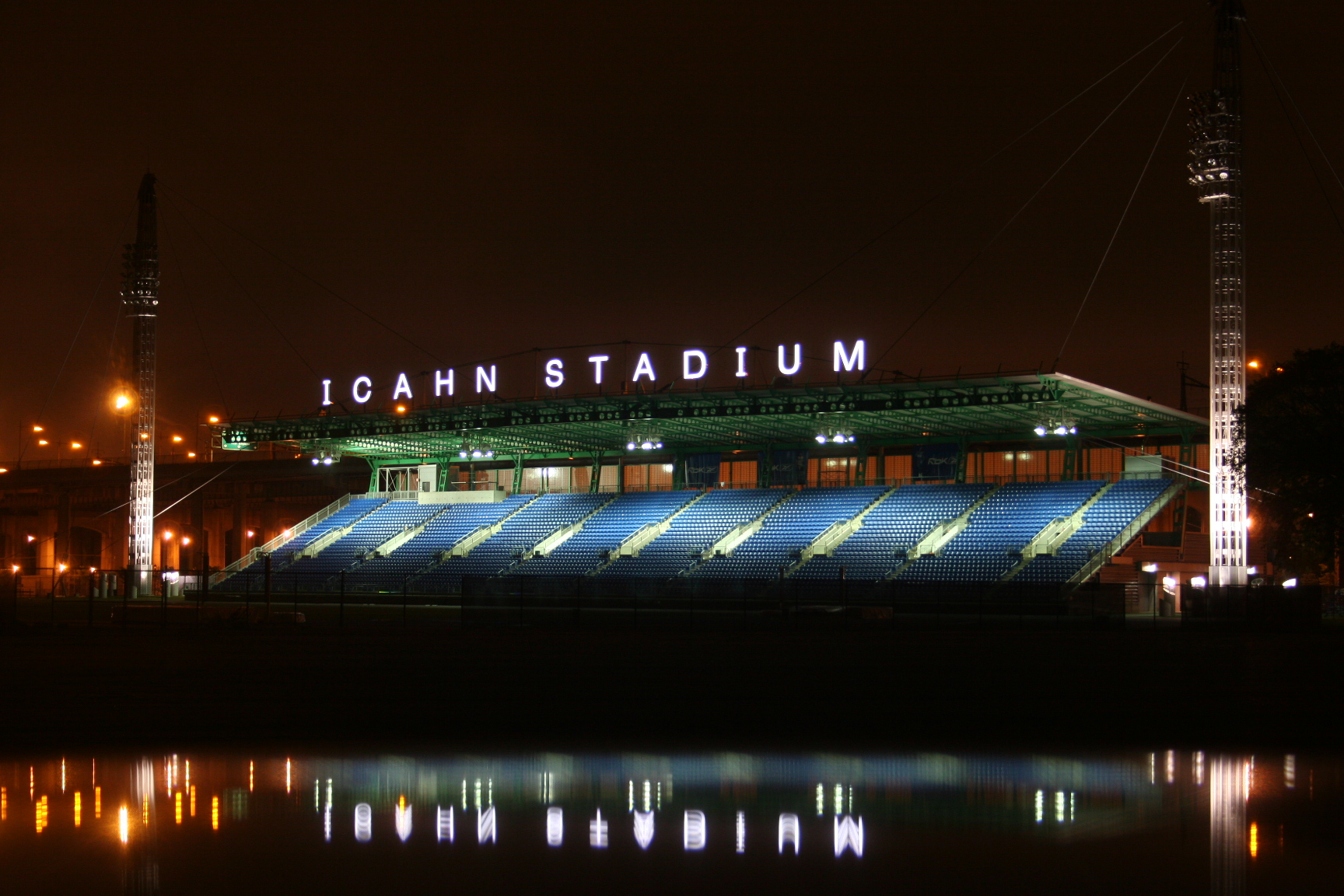
Icahn Stadium (Photo: Tom Paliswiat)

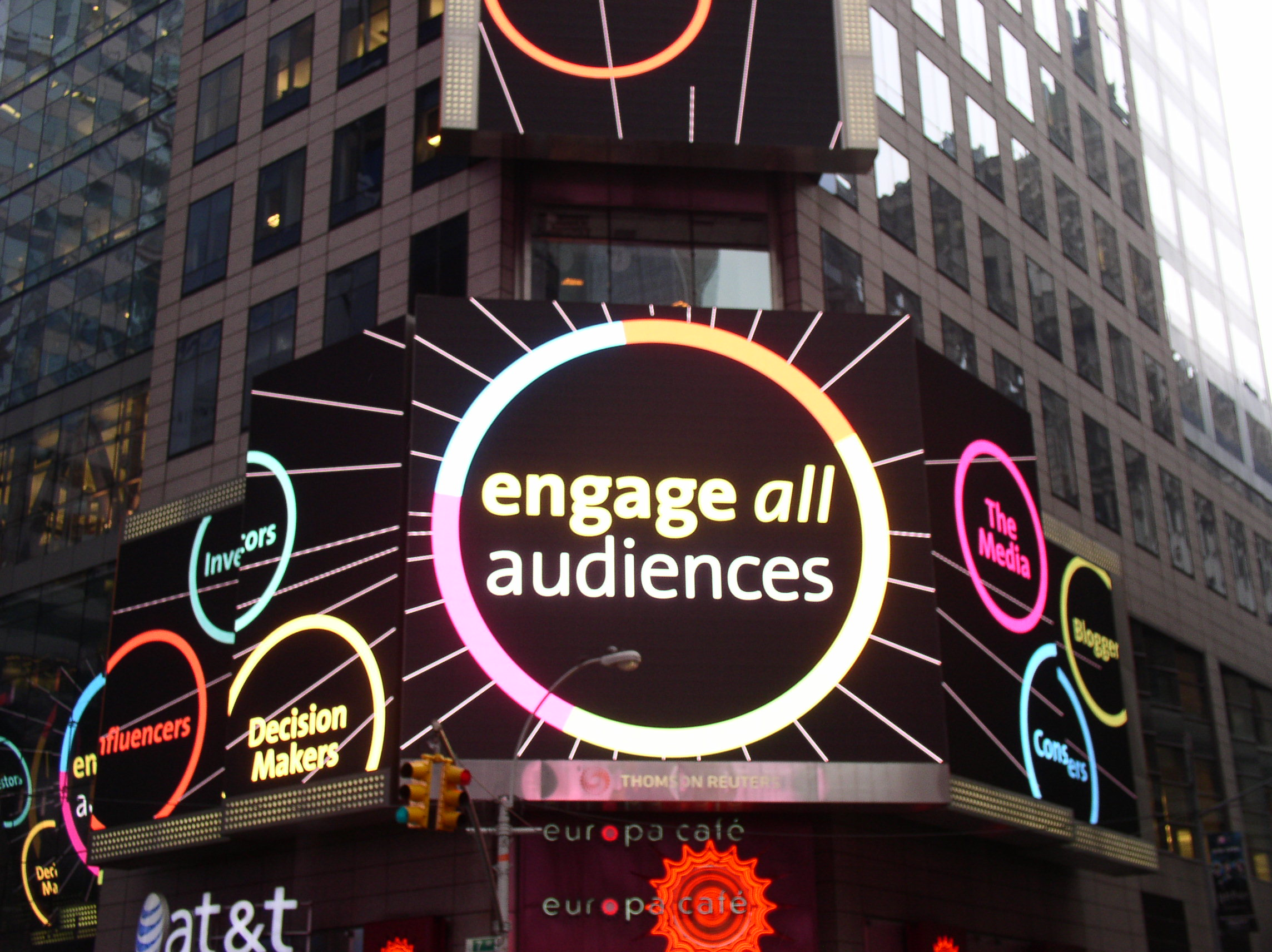
LED screens at 3 Times Square

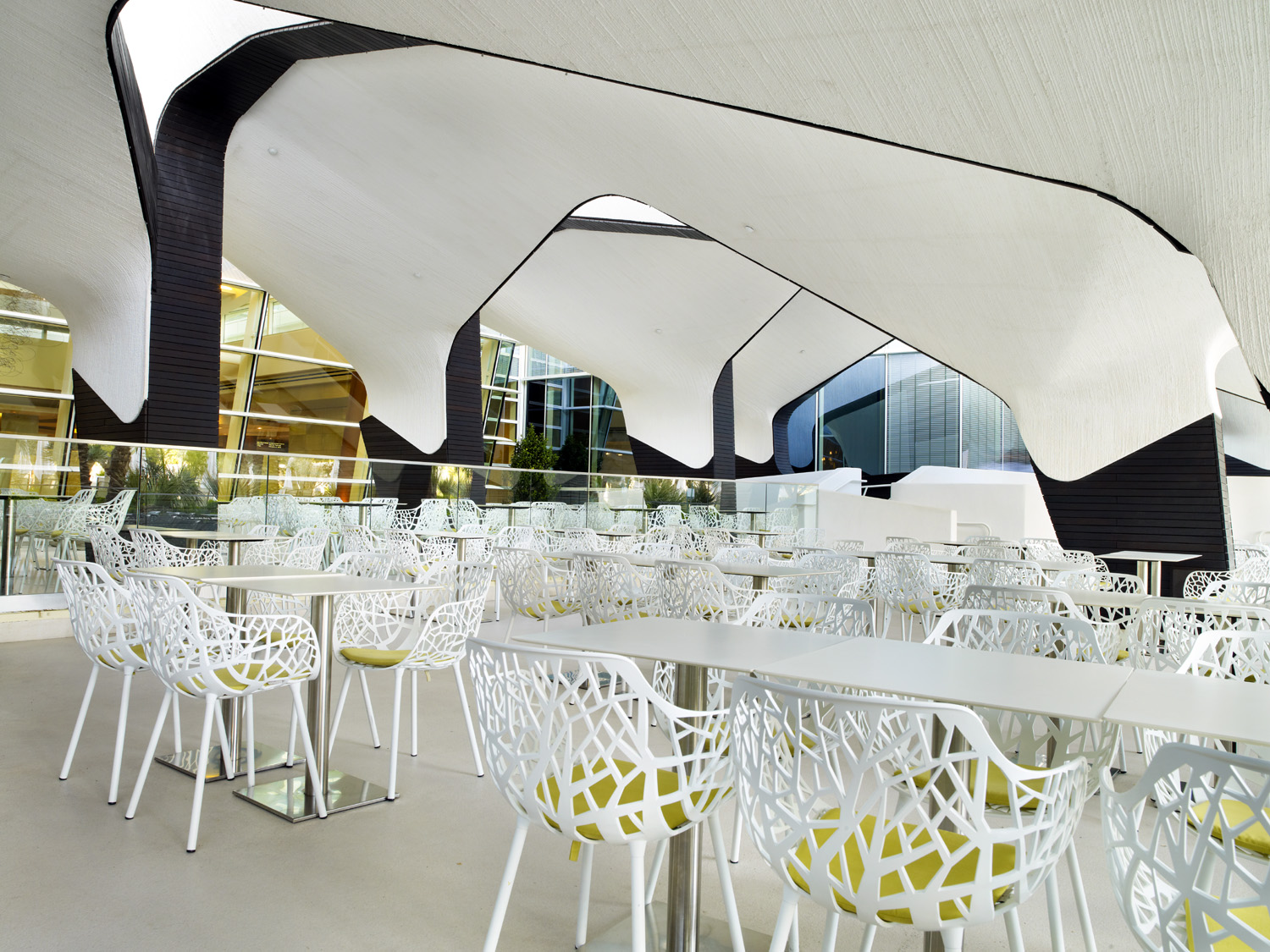
Breeze Cafe on the Pool Deck, The Aria Resort & Casino

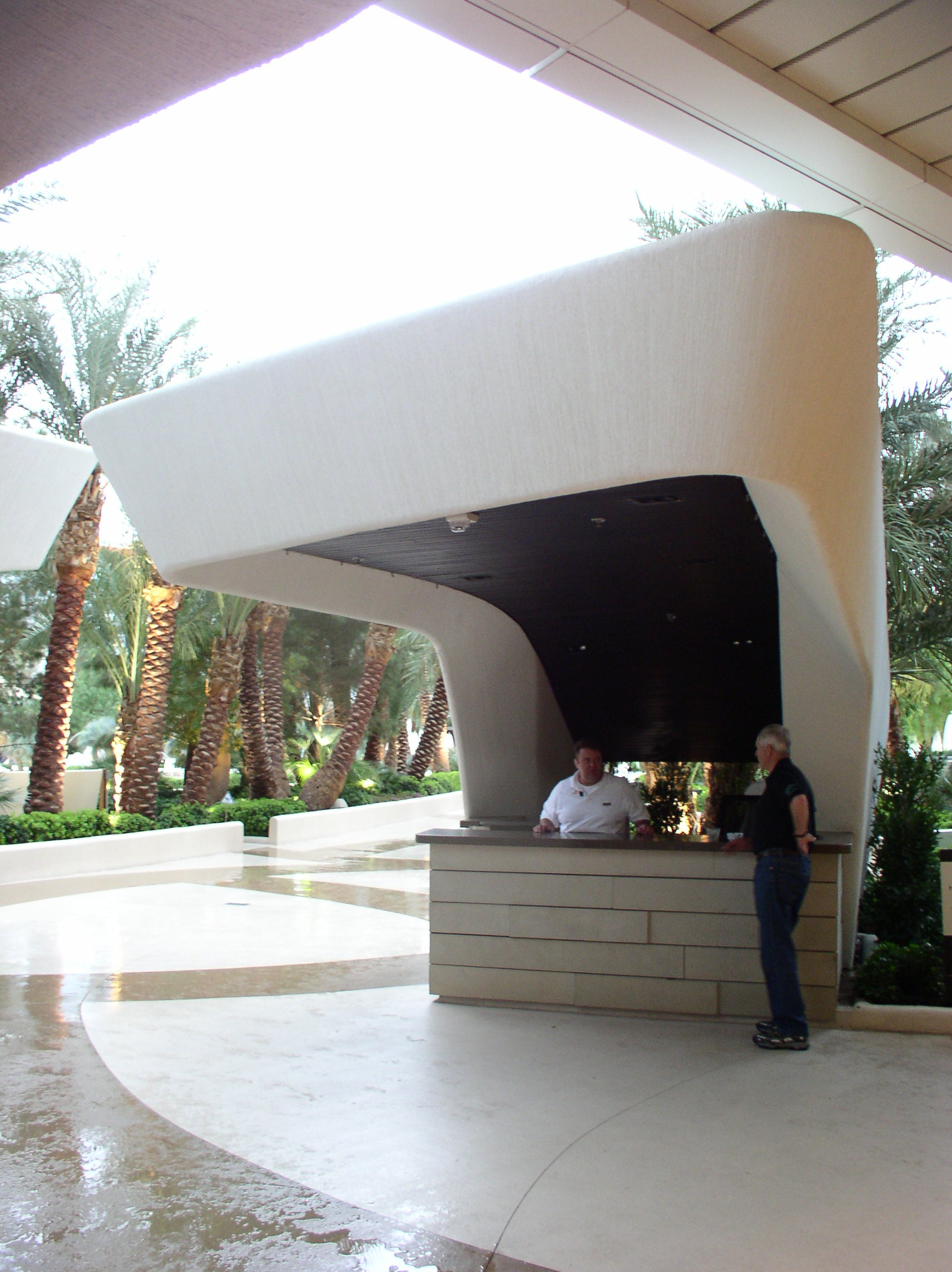
Pool Deck Security Kiosk, The Aria Resort & Casino

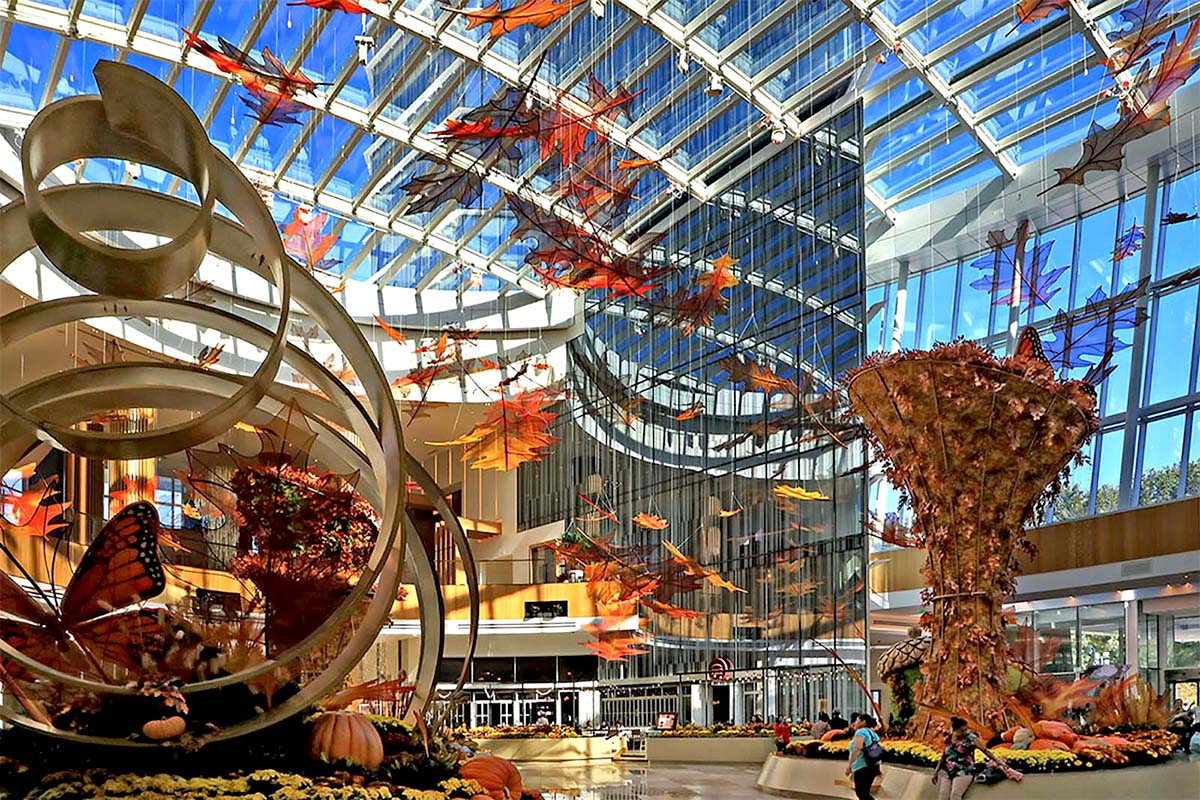
MGM National Harbor Conservatory with Autumn Decor

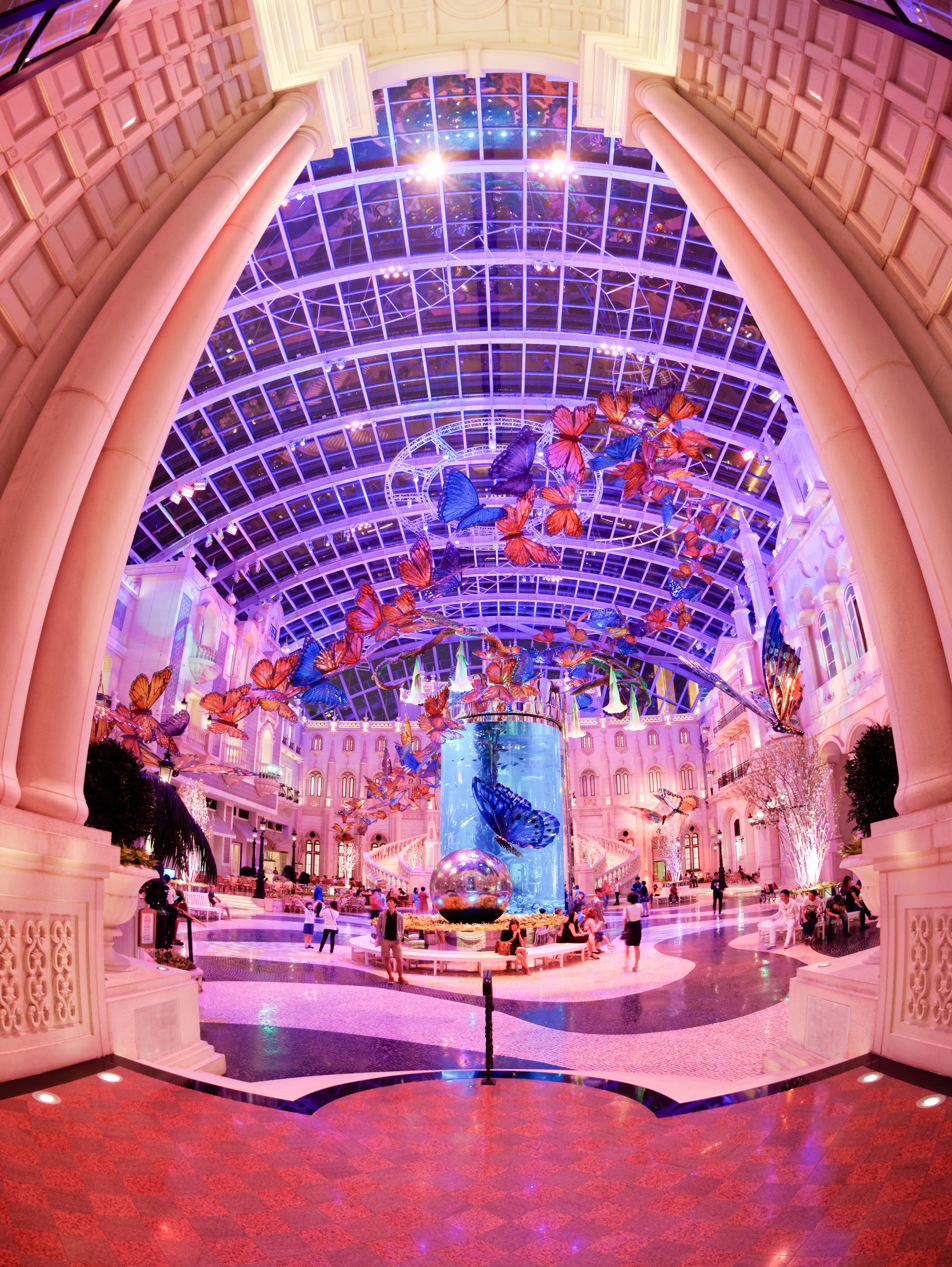
MGM Macau Conservatory with Spring Decor (Photo: Melv_L - MACASR)

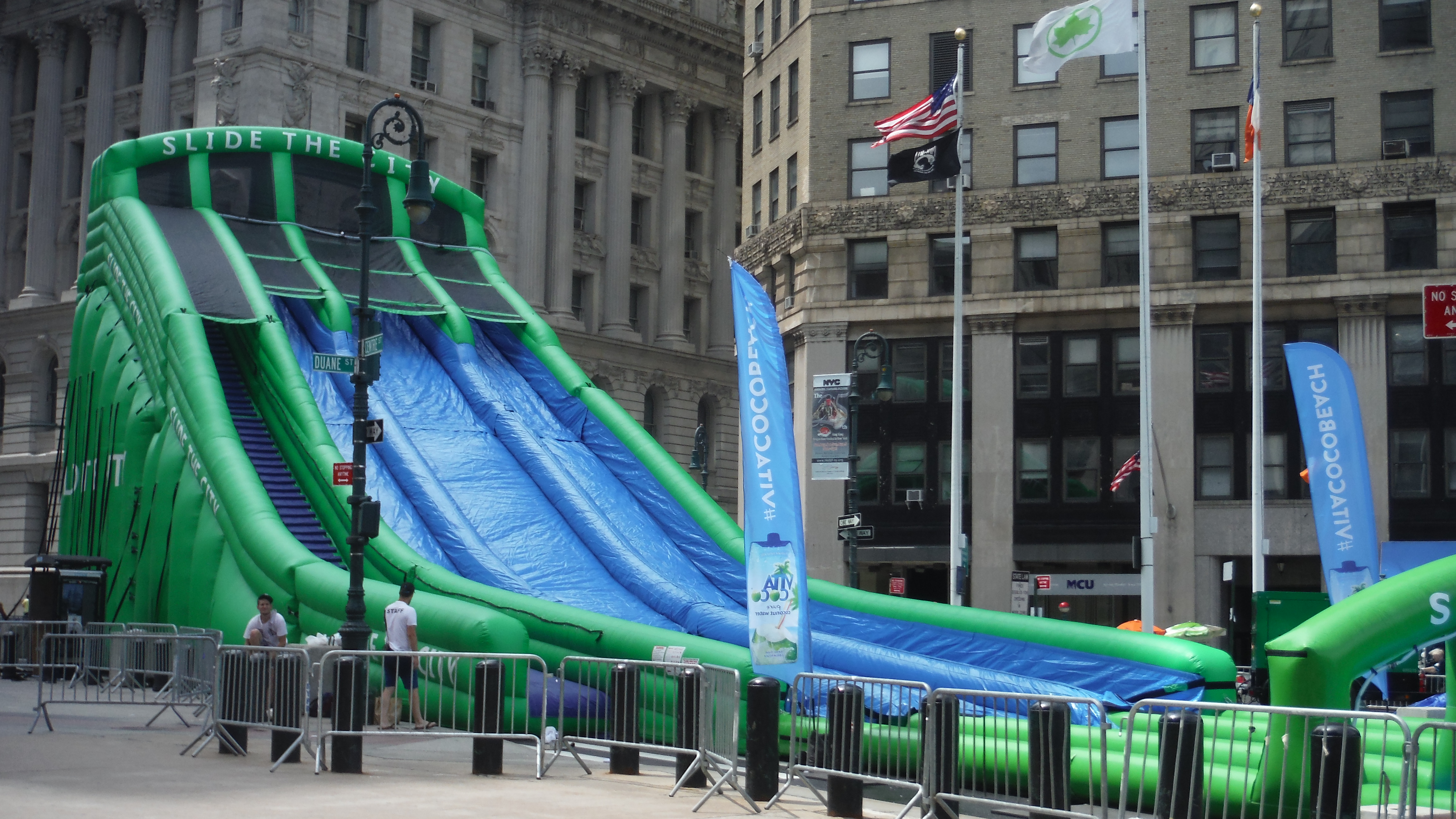
Slide the City at NYC Summer Streets 2015, 2016, & 2017

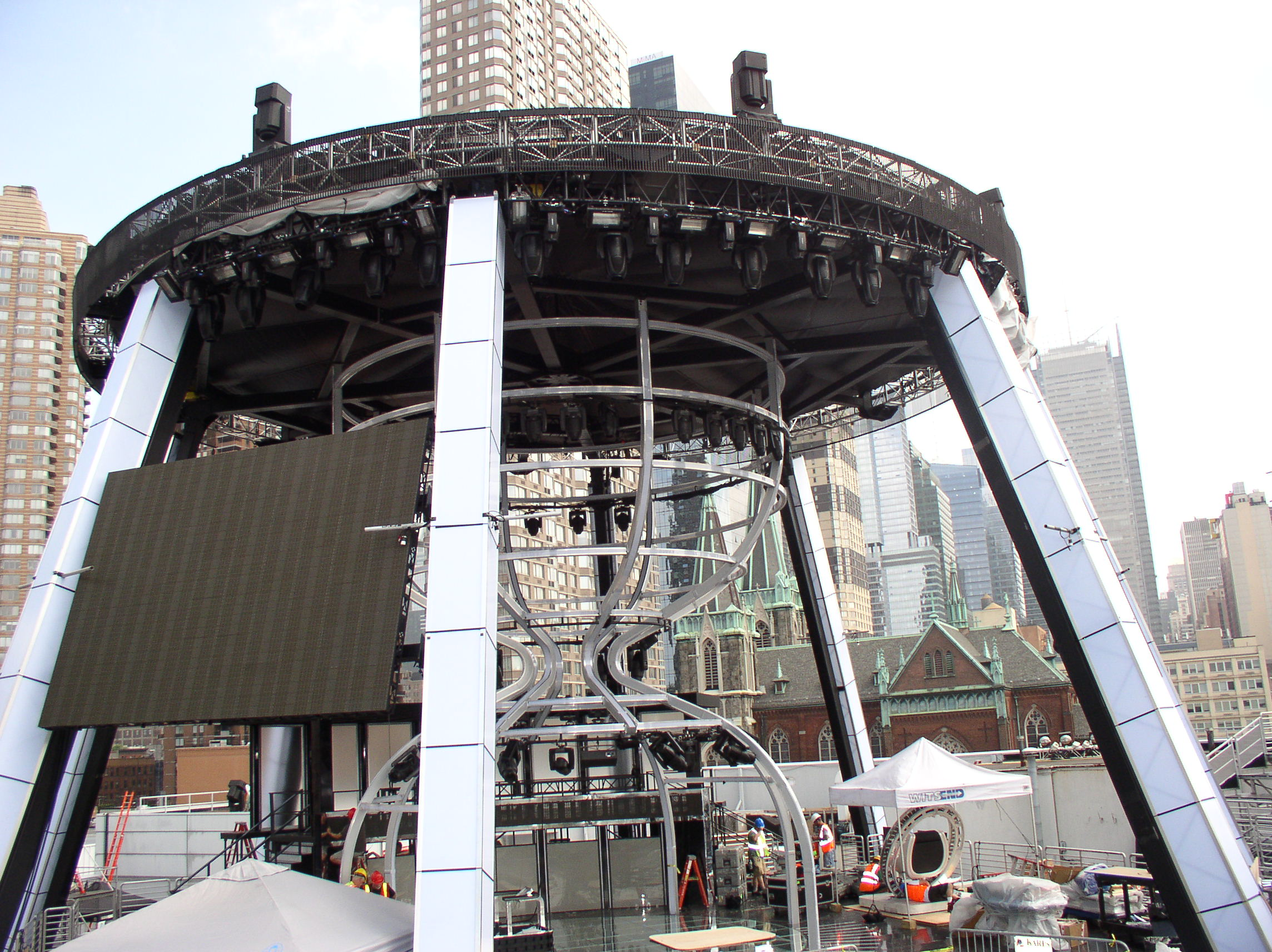
NBC's Million Second Quiz stage under construction

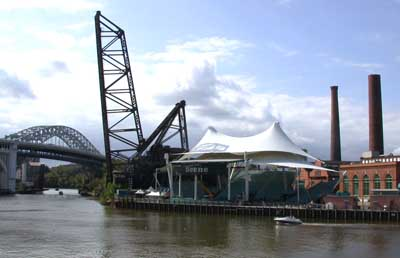
Jacobs Pavilion at Nautica Entertainment Complex (Photo: Decumanus)

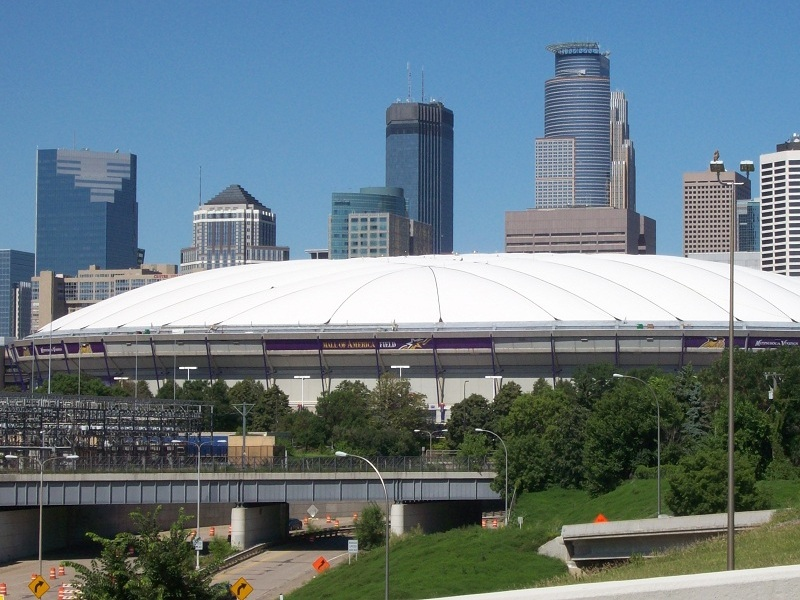
Metrodome

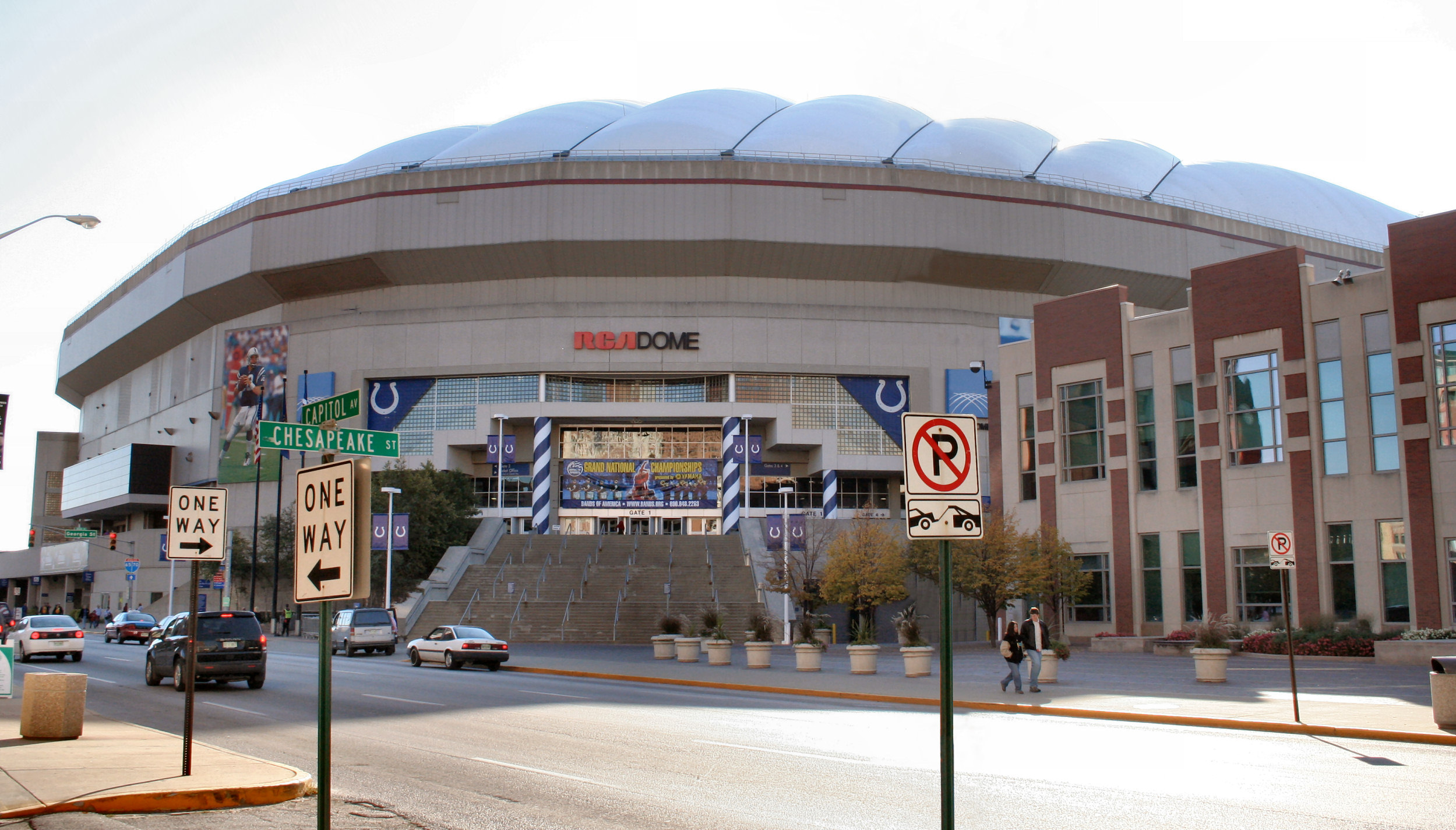
RCA Dome

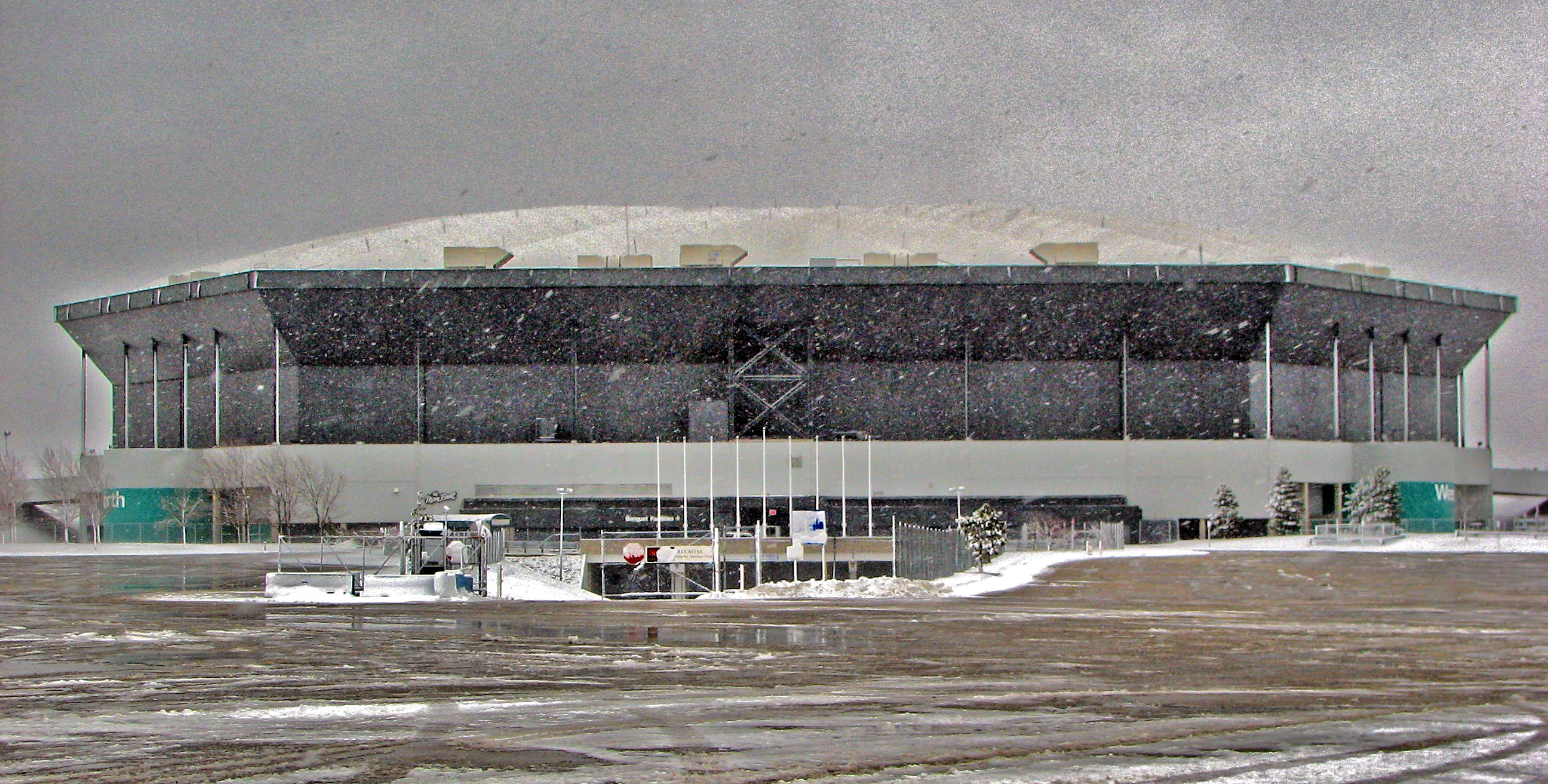
Silverdome (Photo: Dave Hogg, Royal Oak, MI, USA)

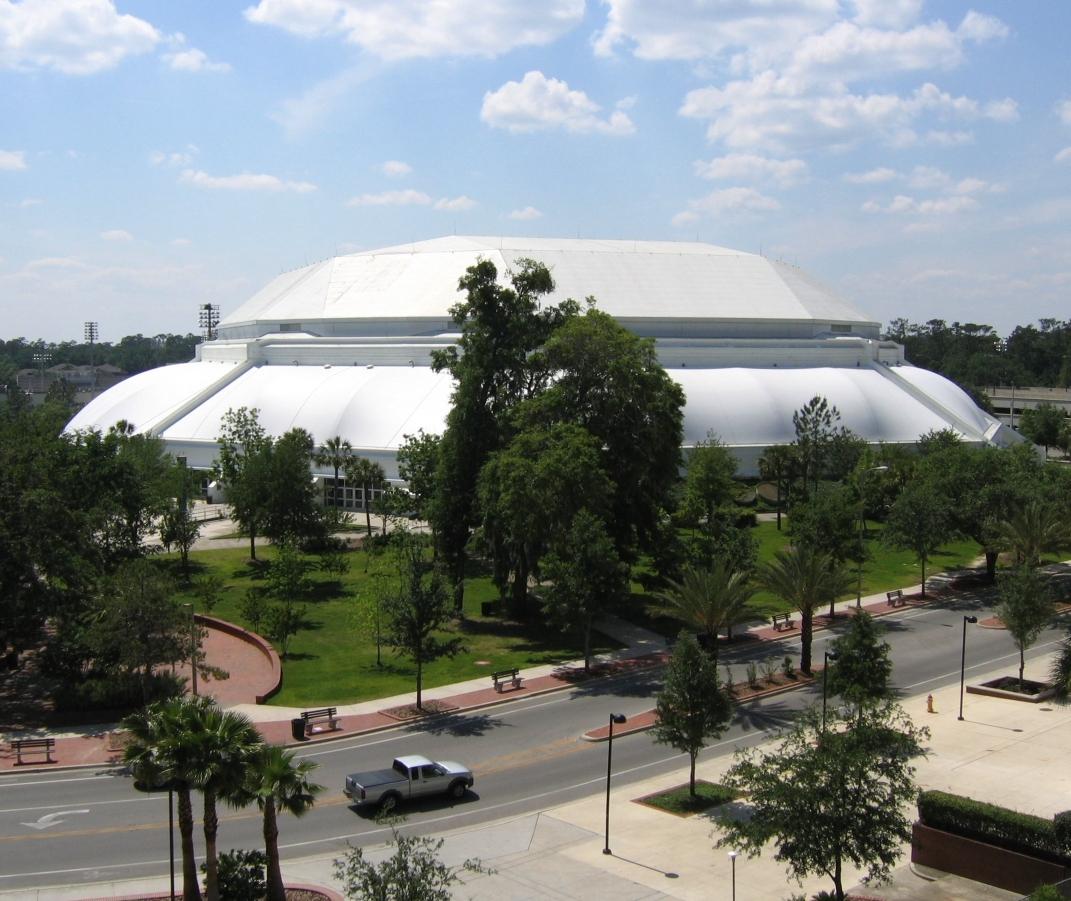
O'Connell Center (Photo: DouglasGreen)

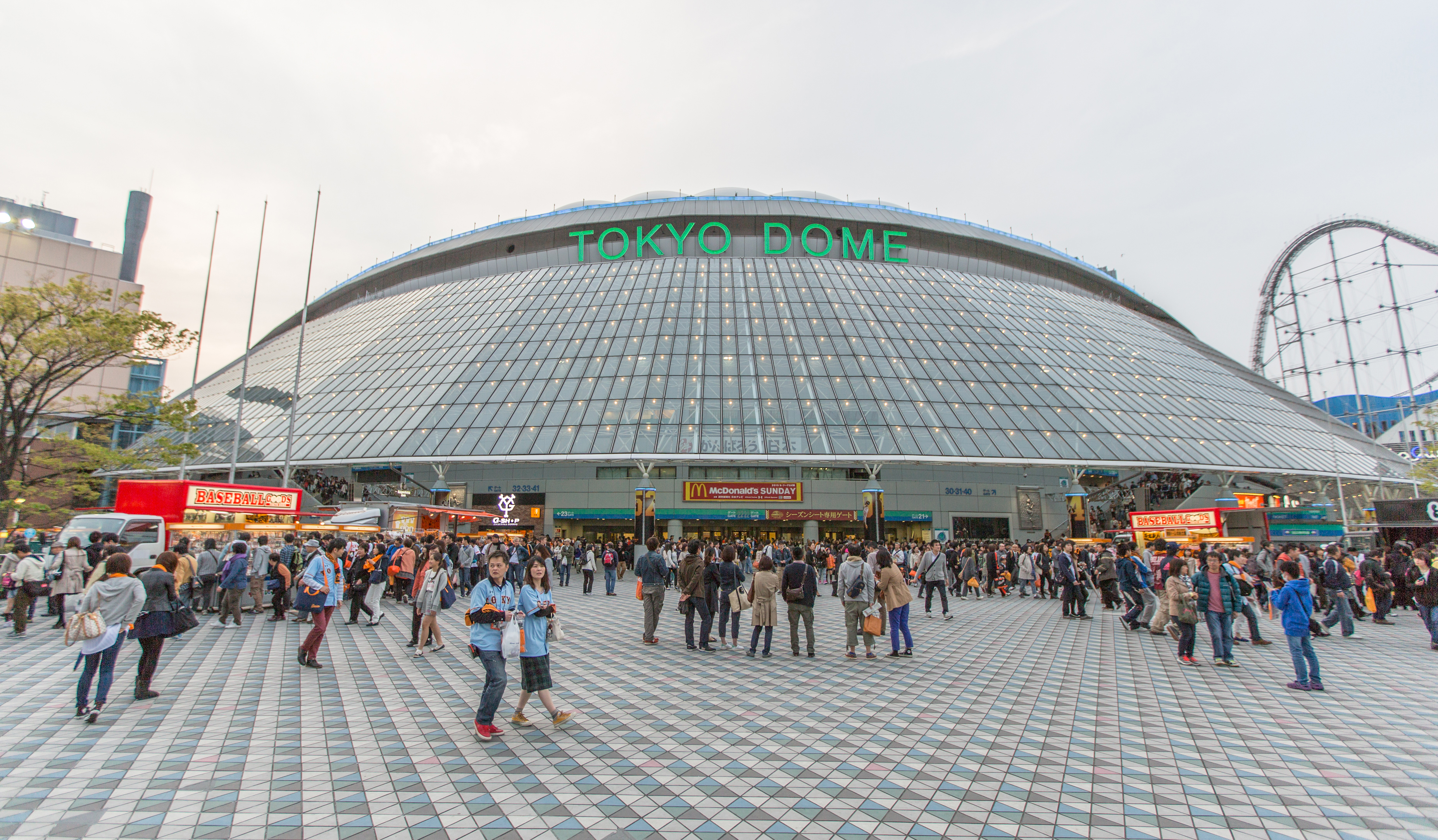
Tokyo Dome (Photo: IQRemix)
