= David H. Geiger =

American engineer (1935–1989)

David H. Geiger (1935 – October 3, 1989) was an American engineer who invented the air-supported fabric roof system that at the time of his death was in use at almost half the domed stadiums in the world.

Geiger was born in Philadelphia, Pennsylvania, received a bachelor's degree from Drexel University, master's degree from the University of Wisconsin–Madison and PhD in engineering from Columbia University.

While an adjunct professor at Columbia University with a part-time engineering practice, Geiger designed the enclosure for the United States pavilion at Expo '70 in Osaka, Japan. He had been tapped after the architecture firm Davis-Brody won the design contest for the building. Davis Brody's winning design was a 30-story high air filled "pumpkin" atop the pavilion and they needed an engineer with the expertise to implement it. Geiger was designing the US Pavilion to be capable of withstanding Japan's earthquakes and typhoons when Congress approved only half of the expected budget. To accommodate this severely reduced budget, he drastically cut the proposed height and used a low profile cable-restrained air-supported roof of his own invention, employing a super-elliptical perimeter compression ring and diagonally-run pattern of cables which prevented fabric sag around the edges. Geiger's fabric air-supported roof invention was significantly cheaper than the largest fixed dome structure of the day: the Astrodome.

After Osaka, Horst Berger joined Geiger's practice which became Geiger Berger Associates. Around the U.S. in the 1970s and early 1980s, Geiger Berger built eight stadia with air-supported roofs. They also went on to produce pioneering designs for a series of low-cost long-span cable, tensile membrane structures including the first tensegrity type dome for the Olympic Gymnastics Venue, Seoul, Korea (which had been inspired by the work of R. Buckminster Fuller), first translucent insulated fabric roof at MNP Community & Sport Centre (originally the Lindsay Park Sports Centre), Calgary, Alberta, Canada, first “permanent” low profile air-supported fabric roof to cover a stadium at the Pontiac Silverdome in Pontiac, Michigan.

The partnership with Berger dissolved in 1983 and Geiger formed Geiger Associates, which was acquired by KKBNA in 1986. In 1988, Geiger in partnership with former Principals and colleagues from Geiger Associates went on to found Geiger Engineers.

Geiger died in 1989 while traveling in Seoul where he had designed three venues for the 1988 Olympics.

== Notable domes ==
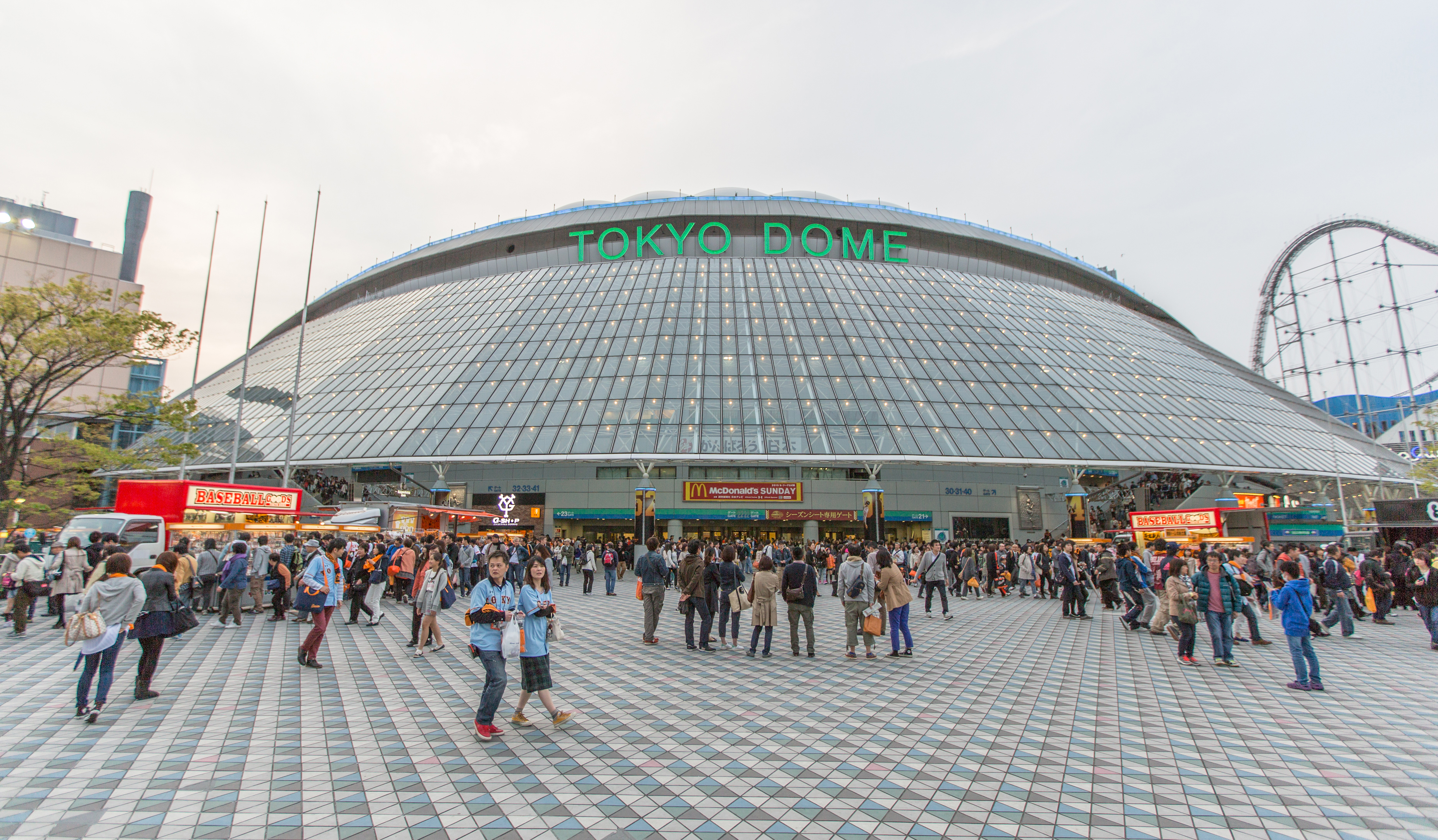
Tokyo Dome (Photo: IQRemix)

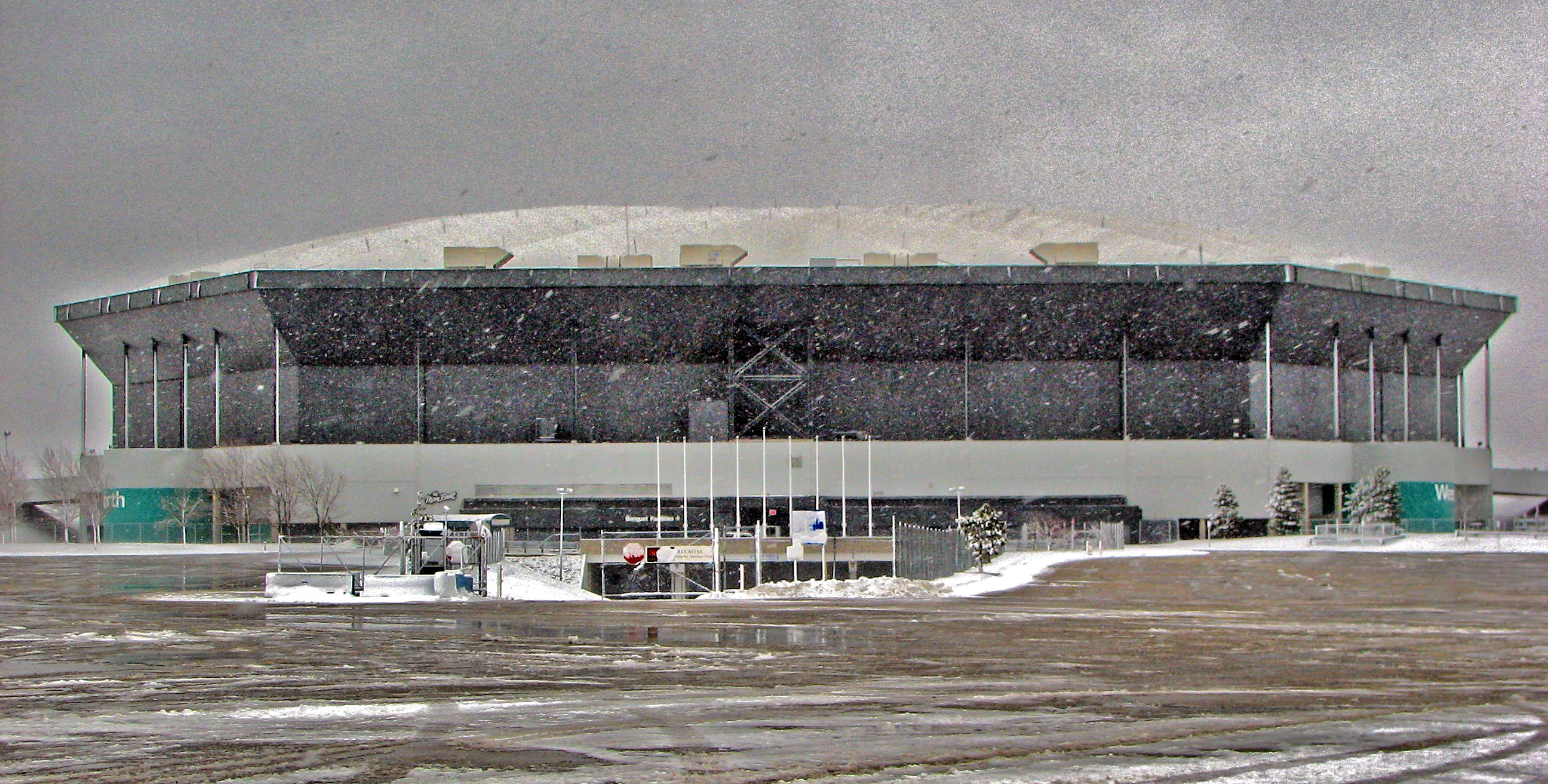
Pontiac Silverdome (Photo: Dave Hogg, Royal Oak, MI, USA)

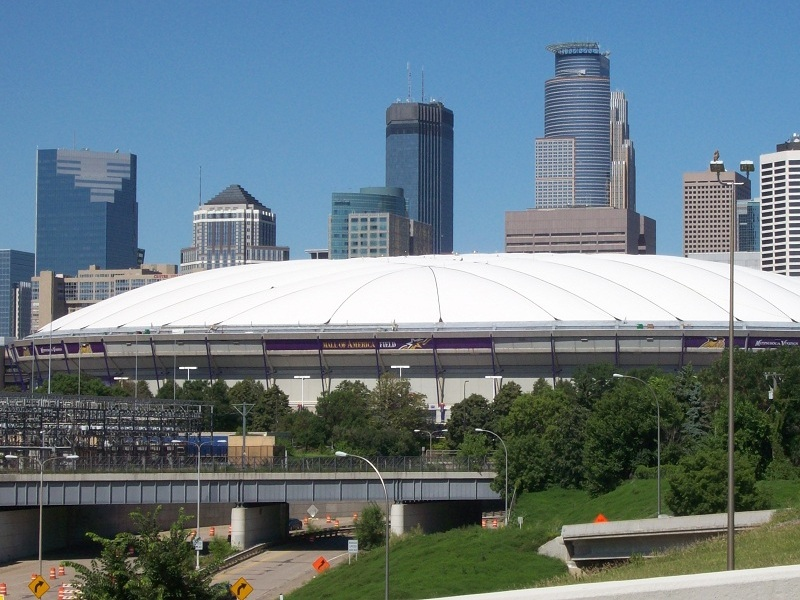
Metrodome

- Pontiac Silverdome, Pontiac, Michigan (1975)
- DakotaDome, Vermillion, South Dakota (1979)
- Stephen C. O'Connell Center (1980)
- Hubert H. Humphrey Metrodome, Minneapolis, Minnesota (1982)
- BC Place, Vancouver, British Columbia, Canada (1983)
- MNP Community & Sport Centre (formerly Talisman Centre and originally Lindsay Park Sports Centre), Calgary, Alberta (1983)
- RCA Dome, Indianapolis, Indiana (1984)
- Tokyo Dome, Tokyo (1988)
- Redbird Arena (1988)
- 1988 Summer Olympics venues in Seoul, Korea
  - Olympic Weightlifting Gymnasium
  - Olympic Fencing Gymnasium
  - Olympic Gymnastics Arena
- Tropicana Field (1989)
