= The Color Run =

Series of 5K races

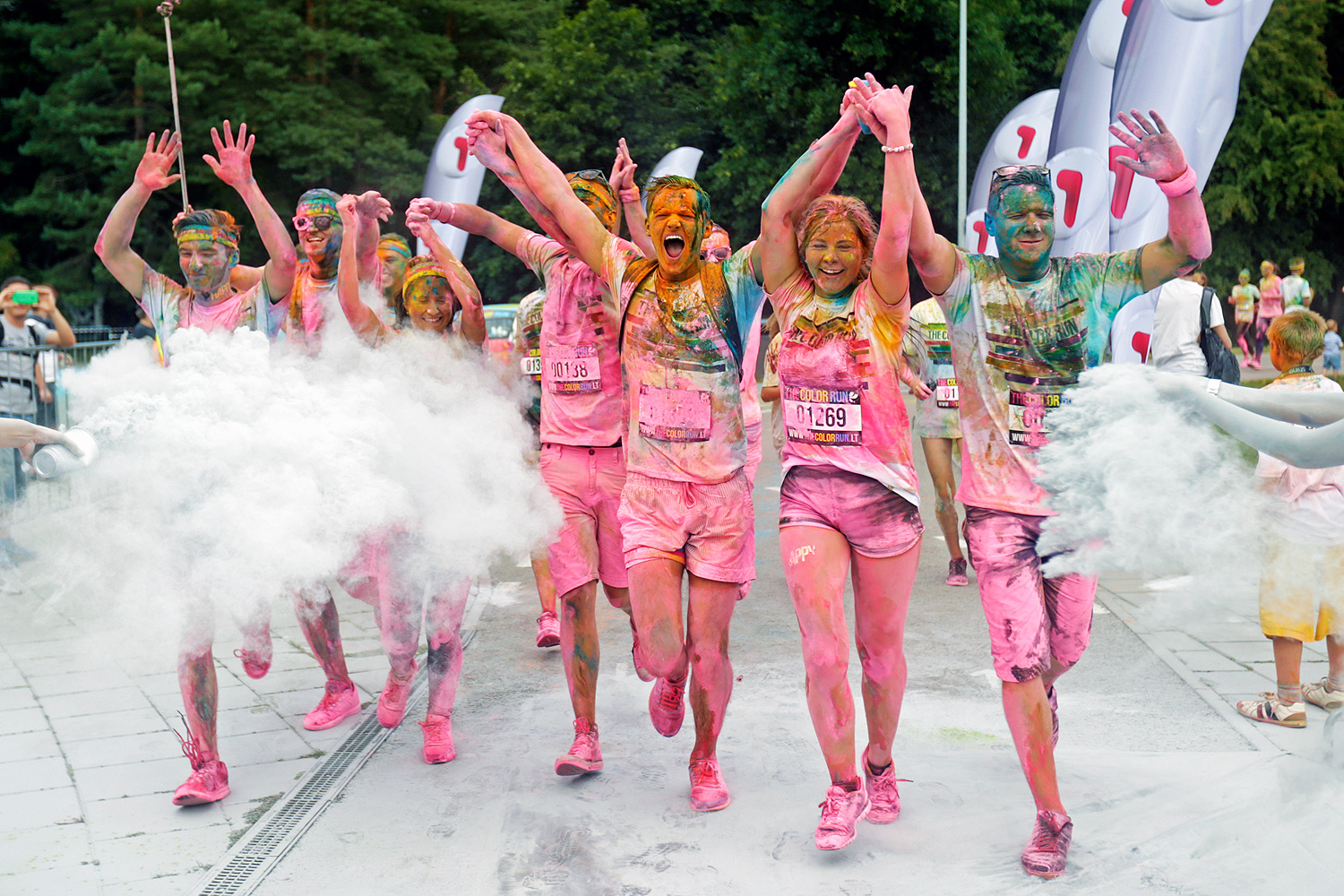
- The Color Run in Vilnius
- Genre: 5K run (untimed)
- Location: International
- Years active: 2012; 14 years ago
- Inaugurated: January 2012 in Phoenix, Arizona
- Website: http://thecolorrun.com http://thecolorrun.com.au http://ca.thecolorrun.com http://www.thecolorrun.be http://thecolorrun.cl http://www.thecolorrun.com.cn http://thecolorrun.fi http://thecolorrun.fr http://thecolorrun.de

The Color Run is an event series and five kilometer paint race, inspired by the Hindu festival of Holi, that is owned and operated by The Color Run LLC, a for-profit company. It takes place in North America, South America, Europe, Asia, New Zealand, Australia, Africa, Qatar and the United Arab Emirates. The untimed event has no winners or prizes, but runners are showered with colored powder, made of food-grade corn starch, at stations along the run.

== Timeline ==
In March 2011, it was first held in Phoenix, Arizona with 6,000 people joined. It was created by Travis Snyder, a Utah native and event producer. His idea was to encourage professionals and novices to have fun together. Influenced by World of Color, Life in Color, and Mud Runs, he further blended the both elements, donation and running for five kilometers, together in order to promote health awareness.

In 2012, it was held over 50 cities in North America with more than 600,000 people joined, making it the largest five-kilometer event series in the United States. It was also held in Flemington Racecourse, Melbourne, Sydney, Brisbane, Gold Coast, Townsville, Sunshine Coast, Perth, Newscastle, Wollongong, Adelaide, Canberra and previously Cairns with more than 12,000 Australian joined and the money was partly donated to the Australian Paralympic Committee.

In 2013, it was held 100 times in North America, South America, Europe, Africa and Australia. It was expanded to Asia and Europe under partnership with IMG Worldwide since February, 2013. In Australia, it was held at Sydney Olympic Park during February and 20,000 Australian joined and helped raise $200,000 for Heartkids.

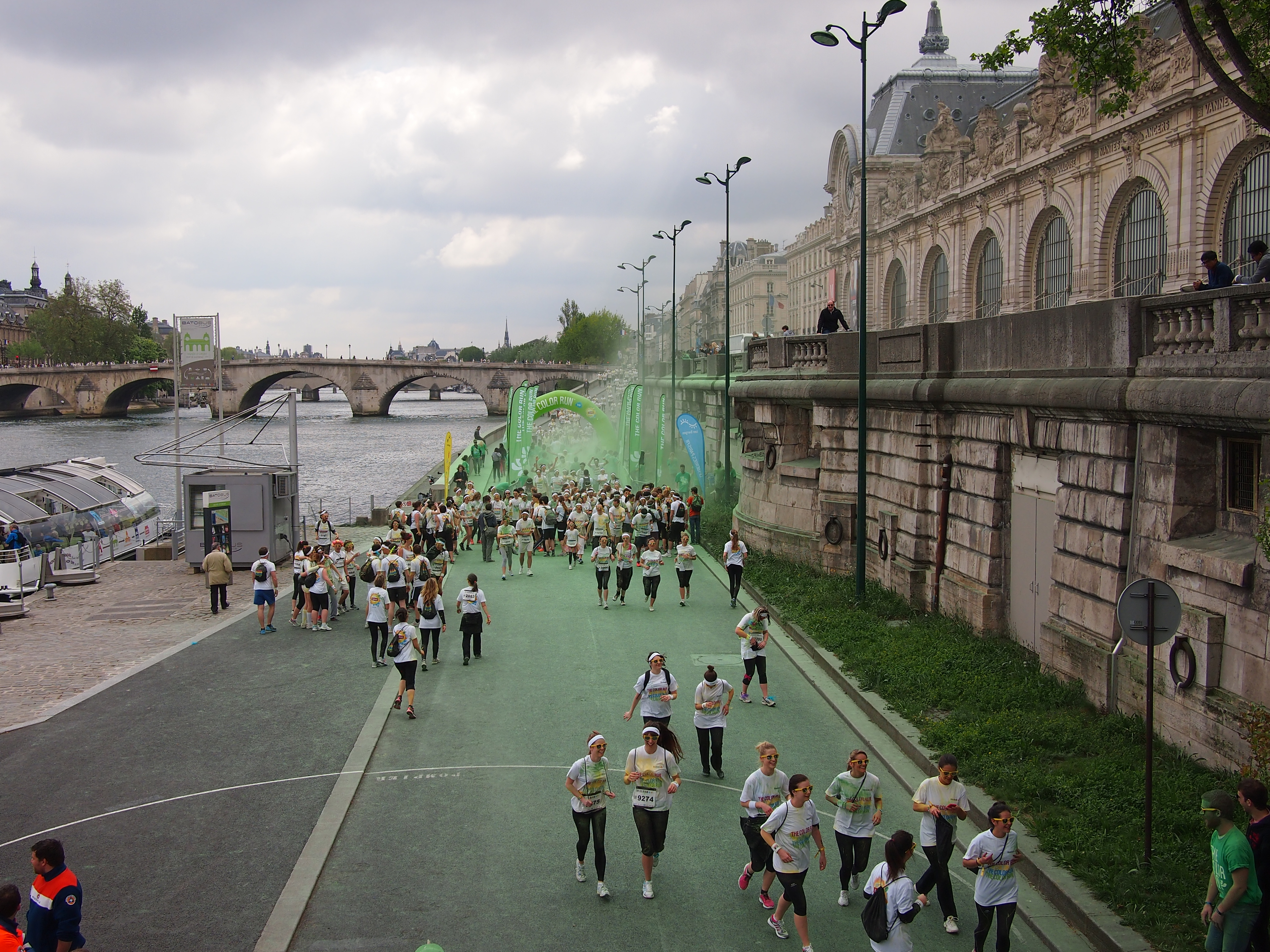
Participants in the 2014 Color Run in Paris passing the green station, located next to the Musée d'Orsay

In 2014, it was held 300 times in over 50 countries worldwide. "The Color Run Night" was first introduced. In April, 2014, It was extended to Seoul, Beijing, Shanghai, Hong Kong, Vietnam, Bangkok, Singapore, and Kuala Lumpur in Asia; Dubai, Qatar, Kuwait, Lebanon and Egypt in Middle East, and Barcelona, Madrid, Amsterdam, Brussels, London, Manchester, and Dublin in Europe. Toronto, Vancouver were also introduced to. Charity partners include Australian Red Cross, Beyond Blue, Vision Australia, Cancer Council, Starlight Children’s Foundation Australia, RSPCA, Heartkids and Fight Dementia. The sponsor, Swisse, were planning to generate over AUD$1 million in charitable contributions through all 13 Color Runs in Australia in 2014.

In 2015 it was held 112 times in the United States, 7 in the United Kingdom, 6 in Australia and 4 in China. Starting in 2016, the Budapest Color Run has been hosted in Hungary.

== Course and participants ==
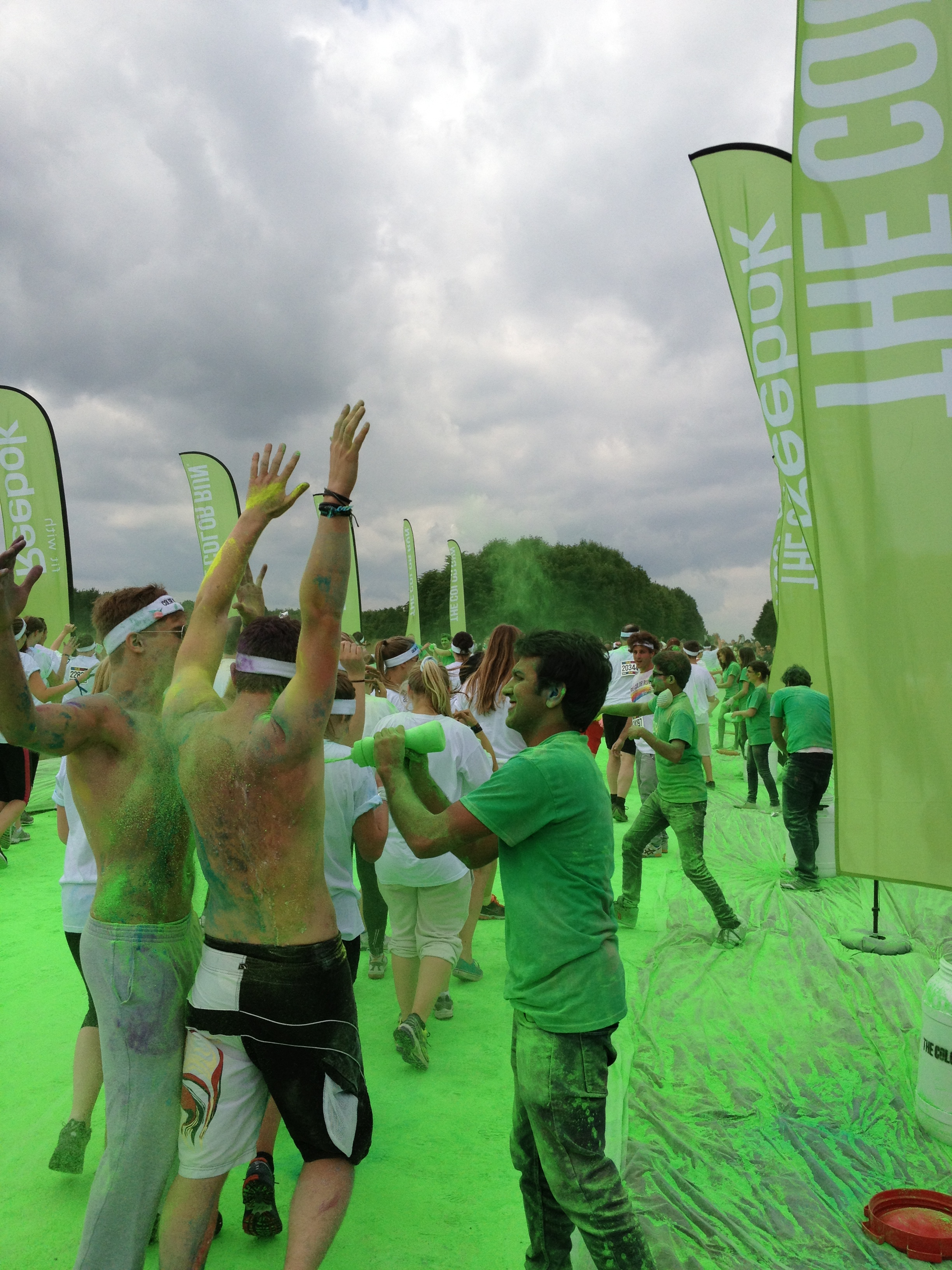
Runners at the green color station at the Color Run in Munich, Germany, 2013

The untimed event emphasizes fun over competition. Open to first-time runners as well as families and children, the event is for runners and walkers. Registration fees typically start at around $24 US but can vary depending on region and package. According to The Color Run’s 2012 figures, over 60% of the participants were running a five-kilometer race for the first time, and over 70% of the participants were women ages 18–40. In 2013, there are expected to be a million participants.

Runners begin dressed in clean white T-shirts, and pass through 5 color stations, one every kilometer. Each color station is associated with a different color, with volunteers blasting the runners with dyed cornstarch out of bottles. At the finish line following the untimed run, there are typically celebrations featuring a dance party and food vendors.

The Color Run currently holds the title of the largest running event in the world. Since early 2011, Travis Snyder has grown The Color Run from a start up to over 200 annual events and over 2 million annual participants in countries throughout North and South America, Europe, Africa, UAE, Australia, and Asia.

=== Tropicolor World Tour ===
In 2016, The Color Run theme was the Tropicolor World Tour featuring new experiences including the Tropicolor Zone where runners were covered in a tropical array of colors and island scents as they passed through palm trees and island-style music. Each runner received a limited-edition race shirt, finisher's medal, and an embroidered headband to wear in the 5k.

=== Shine Tour ===
In 2015, The Color Run's new tour was the Shine Tour. The Shine tour added glitter to the powder and other elements.

=== Kaleidoscope Tour ===
The Kaleidoscope Tour was The Color Run's new tour for 2014. The planned features were to include kaleidoscope attractions on the course, photo opportunities and "Kaleidoscope fun" at the finish festival. The Color Run Erie, one of 98+ tour stops in the Kaleidoscope Tour, sold out in less than a month with 10,000 participants.

=== The Color Run Night ===
On Saturday, October 18, 2014, the very first Color Run Night took place in the United States in the Philadelphia area. Around 10,000 people gathered for the event. The run involved glow-in-the-dark powder, glowing color zones, black lights along the course, and a black light head lamp for each participant to run with.

Participants dress in black and get coated with fluorescent powder on this 5k course. The run finishes with a festival that includes more color and light, and much music and dancing.

On Saturday September 5 at the Circuit Gilles Villeneuve at parc Jean-Drapeau, Montreal will host the first edition of Color Run Night in Canada.

In 2016 The Color Run Night included glowing t-shirt, black light headlamp, and glow color packet.

== Corporate sponsorship ==
Finish Festival at The Color Run in Munich, 2013

A variety of corporations sponsor The Color Run in different locations. For example Chevrolet sponsored The Color Run US in 2012 and 2013, Shout in 2014, Swisse in Australia, and Dulux in the UK and Ireland. Mitsubishi was named the “Official Vehicle Partner” of “The Color Run Night” on October 18, 2014. In South Africa, Capitec Bank is the official sponsor.

Major League Baseball and the Minnesota Twins teamed up to host the inaugural "The Color Run MLB All-Star 5K presented by Nike" on July 13, 2014, at the Minnesota State Fairgrounds in Falcon Heights, Minnesota as part of the festivities of All-Star Week. On hand to get runners started were Hall of Famers Juan Marichal and Dave Winfield; former Twins Scott Erickson and Doug Mientkiewicz; MLB executive vice president of business Tim Brosnan; The Color Run founder Travis Snyder; actor/comedian Rob Riggle; and T.C. plus eight of his fellow MLB mascots, along with Runicorn, mascot for The Color Run. Kat Perkins, the Minneapolis-based singer and top-five contestant on The Voice, performed "The Star-Spangled Banner" before the race.

In 2015 Major League Baseball and The Color Run partnered together during All-Star week in Cincinnati for "The Color Run MLB All-Star 5K, Presented by Nike". The event featured appearances by baseball legends, mascots and other special guests.

In 2016 Major League Baseball and The Color Run partnered for the third year in a row during All-Star Week in San Diego for "The Color Run MLB All-Star 5k, Presented by Nike." The event featured baseball legends and MLB mascots, and singer Michael Franti performed at The Color Run's new yoga event, Soul Pose.

In 2016 The Color Run partnered with Sparkling Fruit2O for races in Canada where participants were given samples of the carbonated waters and teas at the finish line. The Color Run also partnered with Epson in 2016, where they provided an Epson EcoTank tent for post-race photo ops and new technology to check out. In addition to these companies, The Color Run also partnered with Sally Hansen Canada where they did a giveaway for some beauty products as well as tickets to a Color Run event. In the same year Alcatel, Kohls, and KIND partnered with The Color Run in U.S. and Canada. KIND gave away a bike once a month and products at select Color Run cities.

In 2016 The Color Run partnered with Radio Disney Latin America for races in Argentina where the brand was in charge of selecting the disc jockey in charge of musicalizing The Color Run Argentina, who summoned Facu Rodriguez Casal, also distributed the promotional kits, in addition to adding a Disney stand and animators.

== Charity partnerships ==
The Color Run, LLC a for-profit organization, partners with a national or local charity at each event, such as a children’s hospital or a local food pantry.

Global Poverty Project was The Color Run's global charity partner in 2013. According to a Huffington Post article, "Color Runners around the country will have the opportunity to not only run in the happiest race ever, but also get involved in the movement to end extreme poverty through GlobalCitizen.org, where they can learn about issues, take actions, and raise funds for non-profits."

For 2016 along with local charities for each city, The Color Run partnered with the Huntsman Cancer Foundation and the Sigma Chi International Fraternity to be the generation to end cancer.

== Reception ==
According to Running USA, non-traditional running events have increased from low six figures in 2009 to 4 million in 2013. About 60% of The Color Run entrants have never run a 5K. Most are brand new runners of all ages.

=== Media ===
The Color Run was featured on an episode of ABC’s Extreme Weightloss which aired on September 2, 2014. A Color Run was filmed for Australian soap opera Home and Away in October 2014, which was broadcast on April 7, 2015.

=== Awards and recognition ===
The Color Run was honored as the "Best B2C Marketing Team" at the 2014 Utah Marketing Awards.

Travis Snyder, founder and CEO of The Color Run, was selected as part of the Utah Business Magazine "2015 Forty under 40". He was the keynote speaker at Running USA’s "The Next Evolution" conference held June 2015 in Chicago, with a focus on non-traditional races. Runners World named Snyder one of "The 50 Most Influential People in Running" for his innovation, social media savvy, and strategic influence in the running industry.

The Color Run LLC in 2016 was ranked number 3420 on Inc. 5000 list of top 5000 fastest growing private companies.

=== Safety concerns ===
On June 27, 2015, a serious outdoors dust explosion occurred in Taiwan's New Taipei City due to colored cornstarch powder, injuring over 500 participants and causing 15 deaths. This brought public attention to the possible health and safety dangers of airborne powders such as the combustible starch powder used by The Color Run. The Taiwanese government has since banned events islandwide involving combustible colored powder.

On June 30, 2015, the Singapore Police Force (SPF) and Singapore Civil Defence Force (SCDF) said in a joint statement that they will assess all safety aspects associated with the use of colored powder before granting approval for the upcoming Color Run event to be held in Singapore. Additional measures such as changing the colored powder to non-combustible materials such as colored water mist may be required before the event is given approval to proceed.

Due to ongoing safety concerns, Shanghai called off its Color Run. On 2 July 2015, Shenyang also decided to call off its Color Run and promised full refunds to all participants.

Hong Kong officials also considered banning the use of colored powder spray in public events, and the cancellation of two upcoming events that employed the use of these colored powders – a music party called "Life in Color" scheduled to be held on July, 25 and “The Color Run” set for December 6, 2015.

The Color Run has since returned to China where IMG hosted five events in 2016.

The organizers of The Color Run have disclosed that the colored powders they use are "a combination of cornstarch, baking soda, and FD&C dyes". They have said they are committed to staging safe and secure events, asserting that they have "not had any fire-related incidents in over 500 events around the world involving more than 4 million participants". They have also stated that "as a professional events company with highly vetted policies and processes, we conduct thorough testing to ensure the safety of our materials and their application, and we are confident in the safety of our events". However, details about the nature and extent of safety and health effects testing have not been publicly released.

== See also ==
- Slide the City
