= Horst Berger =

American engineer

Horst Berger (1928-2019) was a structural engineer and designer known for his work with lightweight tensile architecture. After receiving a degree in Civil Engineering in 1954 from Stuttgart University in Stuttgart, Germany, he began working in 1955 at the Bridge and Special Structures Department of Wayss and Freitag in Frankfurt. In 1960, he joined Severud Associates in New York city and worked on projects such as the St. Louis Arch, Madison Square Garden, and Toronto City Hall.

After forming Geiger Berger Associates in 1968 with air supported roof inventor David Geiger, the firm gained international recognition for its incorporation of lightweight fabric structures into permanent architectural designs.

During his time at Geiger Berger Associates, Horst Berger had the challenge of engineering the 105-acre (0.42 km^{2}) roof designed by architect Fazlur Rahman Khan of Skidmore, Owings and Merrill for the Haj Terminal at the Jeddah Airport. This tensile fabric structure consists of 210 roof units contained in ten modules that are supported on steel pylons.

In 1990 Horst Berger was asked to create a tensile fabric roof for the Denver International Airport. Challenges of snow loading and attaching the rigid walls to the fabric roof made it one of Berger’s toughest projects. The unique design with the roofing structure gave the terminal a more spacious layout.

In 1990 he became a professor at the School of Architecture of the City College of New York.

While studying and working in New York, Berger married an American woman Gretchen (Gay) Smart. They had four children, Ralf, Susie, Paul and Barbara; Barbara died in 2011, aged 53.

== Notable works ==
- Hajj terminal, King Abdul Aziz International Airport, Jeddah, Saudi Arabia
- King Fahd International Stadium, Riyadh, Saudi Arabia
- Seaworld Pavilion, San Diego, California
- San Diego Convention Center, San Diego, California
- Wimbledon Tennis Arena, Wimbledon, London, United Kingdom
- Great Hall, Alexandra, London, United Kingdom
- Shoreline Amphitheater, Mountain View, California
- Whale Pool Enclosure for the New York Aquarium, Brooklyn, New York
- Denver International Airport, Colorado
- Eilat Performing Arts Center, Elat, Israel
- Metrodome, Minneapolis

== See also ==
- Tensile architecture
- Tensile and membrane structures
