= Slide the City =

International event company

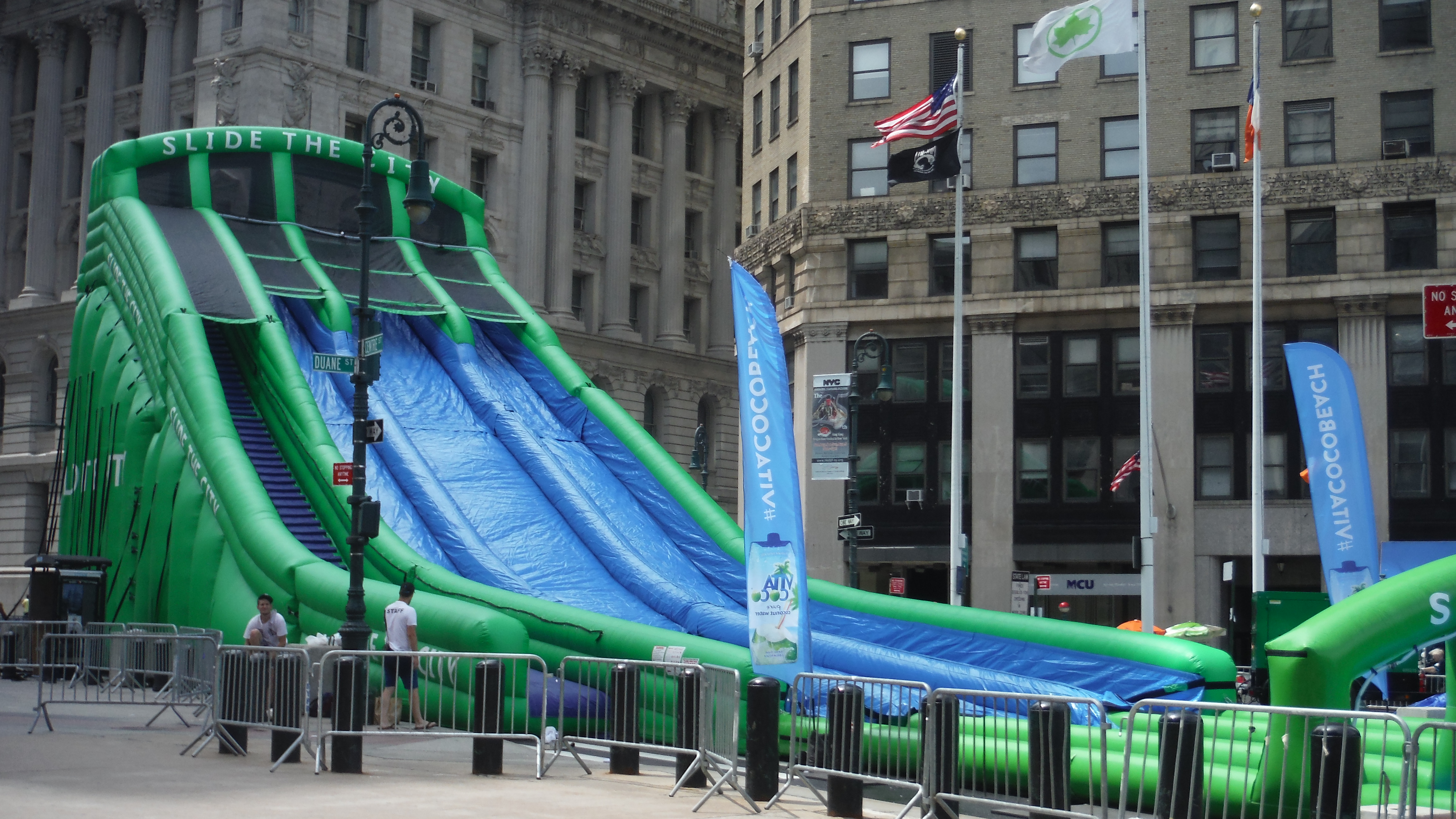
Slide the City 2015, NYC

Slide the City was a Slip 'N Slide water party event provider. Slide the City events took place in more than 200 cities around the world including, Salt Lake City, Hong Kong, Vancouver, Arizona, and Cape Town. The main attraction of the events was a 1,000-foot (300 m) long water slide, made of vinyl material. Other than the slide, “live music, food and drinks” were provided to participants.

From 2019 onwards, Slide the City's website has been inactive. The company appears to have become insolvent and no longer holds any events.

== History ==
According to CNN, Slide the City was founded by T.R. Gourley, John Malfatto and David Wulf in 2013, who claim that they were “inspired by their own childhood memories” to create the event.

Slide the City is owned by Sack Lunch Productions, a Utah-based for-profit company.

The company seems to have closed/ceased-doing-business as its website is locked by its host provider, and no 2019 dates are available.

== Aims ==
The company promotes Slide the City as an event which provides an opportunity for the sliders to go back to the old days of the 1980s, when backyard water slides were generally in demand among children. However, it features a larger community water slide of 1,000 feet (300 m).

The event is promoted as a “family friendly slip-and-slide water party event” in the summertime. “The main goal is just to bring communities together. We want people to have something to come and do, something that’s fun, something that builds a community up,” said Kurt Jackson, the slide manager. As stated on the official website, apart from the entertaining value that the event offers, Slide the City is also aiming at raising water conservation awareness, and providing clean water around the world. T R Gourley, the cofounder of Slide the City, claims to minimize water usage at their event, making minimization of environmental impact on the communities a priority concern

== Charity partnerships ==
Slide the City is described as an event that couples fun with fundraising. Part of the proceeds from each event will be contributed to a cause local to the venue. Slide the City is held in various locations and there are different forms of charity, including donation, fund-raising and free tickets giveaway. It supports nonprofit organization or charities with different nature and aspiration.

For example, Slide the City in Hong Kong supports a charity called "A Drop of Life" by donation. Slide the City in Allentown also raised funds for the non-profit organization, "Allentown Youth Organizations United to Help". Other than that, in Slide the City of Lancaster, by typing the promotional code offered by the host when purchasing tickets, 15% of the sale will be transferred directly to the organization, "The Mix". The event has delivered 500 free single-ride tickets and raised $10,000. Moreover, the donation of Slide the City in Boise goes to "Ronald McDonald House Charities of Idaho" (RMHCI); for each volunteer who applies for a shift during the event, RMHCI will receive a $50 donation.

== Criticism ==
There were complaints about poor organization and crowd control. The waiting time was up to two to three hours between slides and unlimited ticketholders were only able to slide two times. Participants expressed their complaints that they were unable to access unlimited rides and get into the number of rides they paid for.

Safety issues were also raised by the public. Some participants suffered minor injuries as the slides were too steep and they were unable to slow down at the end of the slide. However, at a different venue, participants complained about the water insufficiency and the lack of gradient of the slide which resulted in people crashing into each other . in response to these complaints, The organizer claimed that a team was put together to calculate the best slide inclination in advance to future events. Some participators complained that the organizers did not prevent participants using picture-taking devices, like selfie sticks and action cameras and this may pose risks to others and cause crashes.

There were also environmental concerns. More than 6000 people signed an online petition to stop this event from setting up in California and thousands of people have signed a petition demanding cancellation of the event in Johannesburg. Those signers said that it is “extremely irresponsible” to allow an event featuring giant water slide to take place as these places were facing water shortages. The organizers replied by claiming that the slide will use 12,000 to 16,000 US gallons (45,000 to 61,000 L; 10,000 to 13,300 imp gal) of water, and the slide was designed to recycle water throughout the day instead of pumping new water into the slide.

== Recognition ==
In 2015, the water slide of Slide the City was used by The Trinity River Vision Authority to set the world record for the “longest distance travelled on a slip and slide in one hour” on Panther Island, Texas. According to Guinness World Record, the participants collectively travelled a distance of 774,515.09 metres (2,541,060.0 ft) in an hour.

== See also ==
- The Color Run
- Water slide
