= Tensile structure =

Structure whose members are only in tension

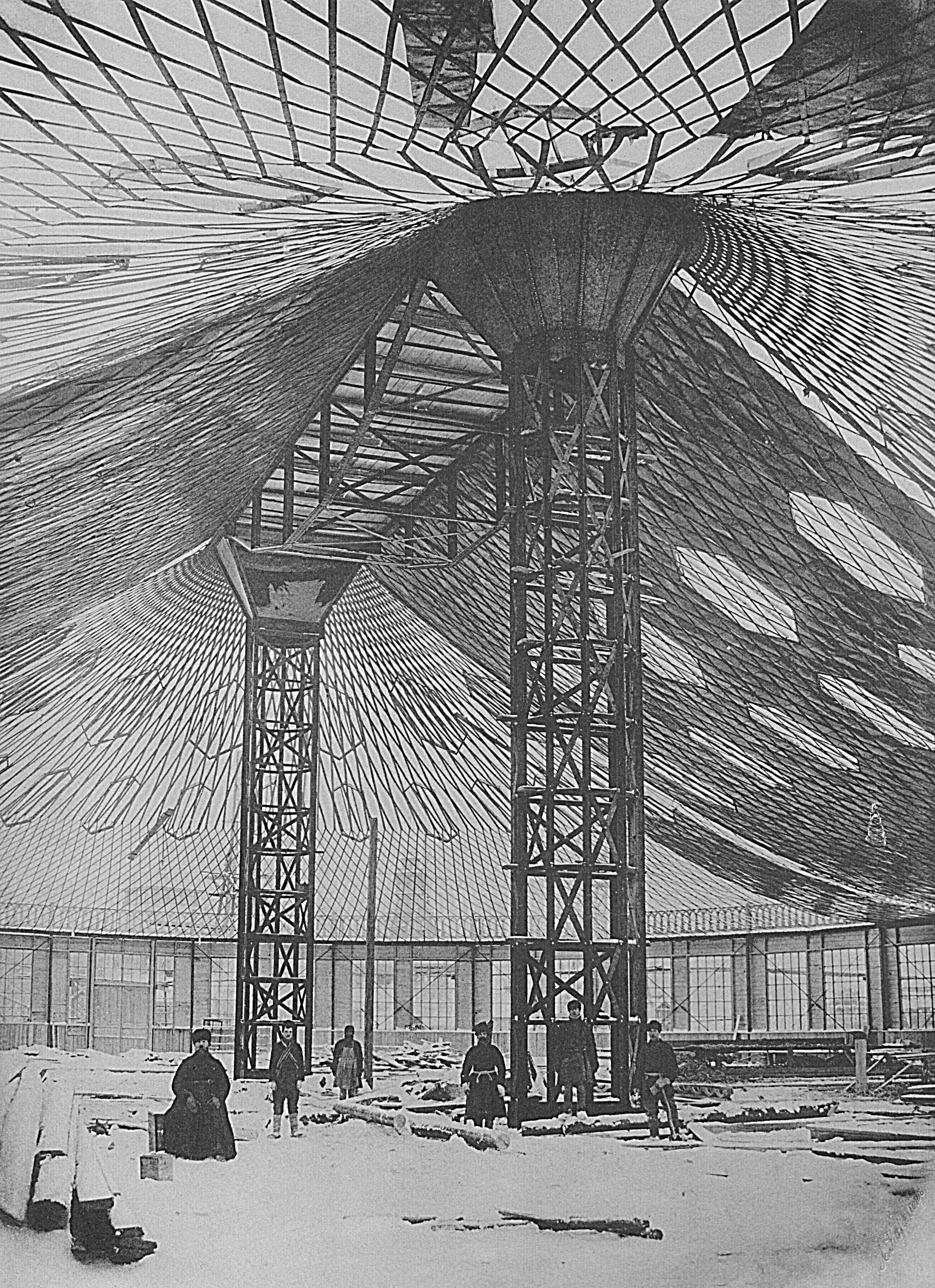
The world's first tensile steel shell by Vladimir Shukhov (during construction), Nizhny Novgorod, 1895

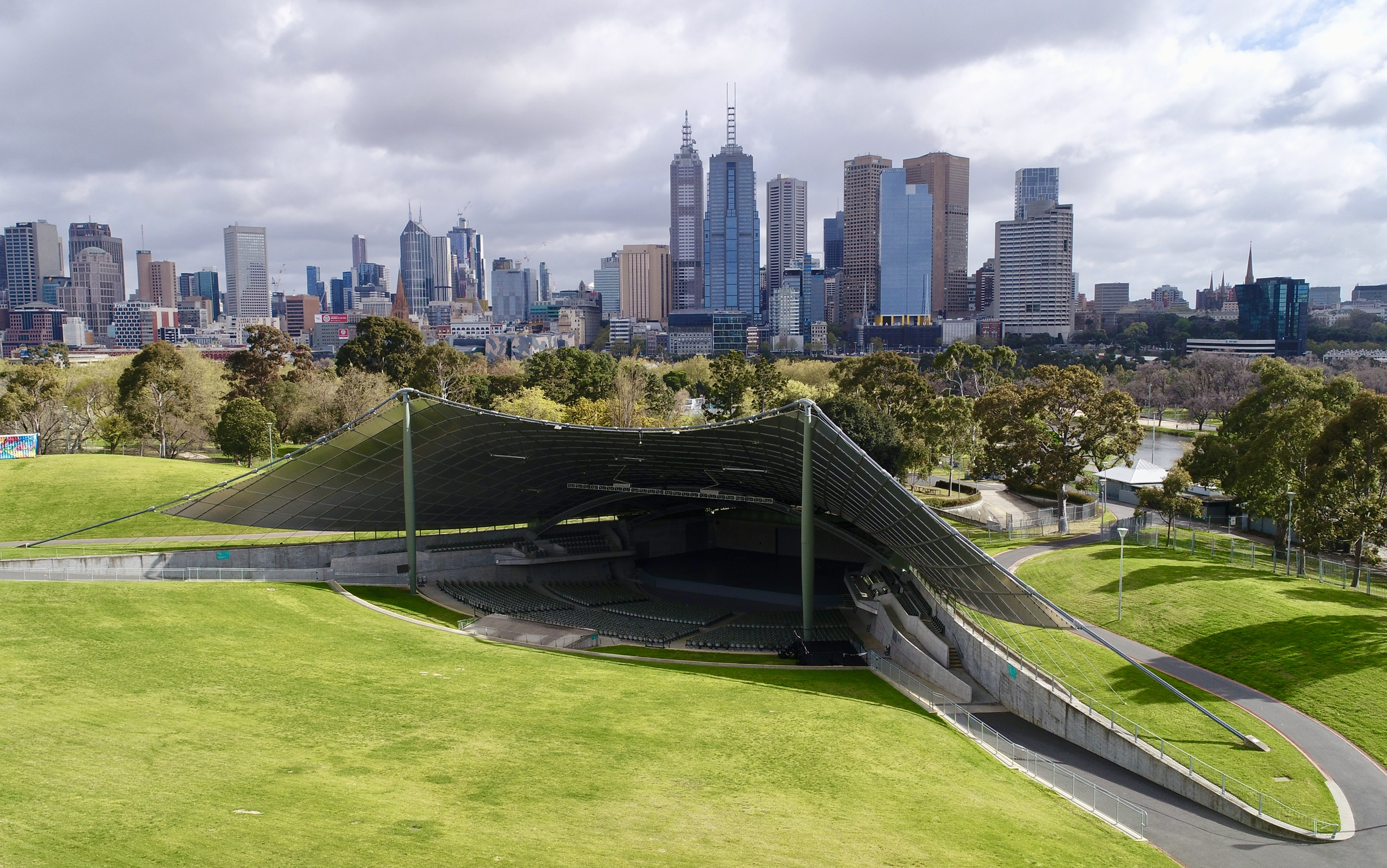
The Sidney Myer Music Bowl in Kings Domain, Melbourne

In structural engineering, a tensile structure is a construction of elements carrying only tension and no compression or bending. The term tensile should not be confused with tensegrity, which is a structural form with both tension and compression elements. Tensile structures are the most common type of thin-shell structures.

Most tensile structures are supported by some form of compression or bending elements, such as masts (as in The O_{2}, formerly the Millennium Dome), compression rings or beams.

A tensile membrane structure is most often used as a roof, as they can economically and attractively span large distances. Tensile membrane structures may also be used as complete buildings, with a few common applications being sports facilities, warehousing and storage buildings, and exhibition venues.

== History ==
This form of construction has only become more rigorously analyzed and widespread in large structures in the latter part of the twentieth century. Tensile structures have long been used in tents, where the guy ropes and tent poles provide pre-tension to the fabric and allow it to withstand loads.

Russian engineer Vladimir Shukhov was one of the first to develop practical calculations of stresses and deformations of tensile structures, shells and membranes. Shukhov designed eight tensile structures and thin-shell structures exhibition pavilions for the Nizhny Novgorod Fair of 1896, covering the area of 27,000 square meters. A more recent large-scale use of a membrane-covered tensile structure is the Sidney Myer Music Bowl, constructed in 1958.

Antonio Gaudi used the concept in reverse to create a compression-only structure for the Colonia Guell Church. He created a hanging tensile model of the church to calculate the compression forces and to experimentally determine the column and vault geometries.

The concept was later championed by German architect and engineer Frei Otto, whose first use of the idea was in the construction of the West German pavilion at Expo 67 in Montreal. Otto next used the idea for the roof of the Olympic Stadium for the 1972 Summer Olympics in Munich.

Since the 1960s, tensile structures have been promoted by designers and engineers such as Ove Arup, Buro Happold, Frei Otto, Mahmoud Bodo Rasch, Eero Saarinen, Horst Berger, Matthew Nowicki, Jörg Schlaich, and David Geiger.

Steady technological progress has increased the popularity of fabric-roofed structures. The low weight of the materials makes construction easier and cheaper than standard designs, especially when vast open spaces have to be covered.

== Types of structure with significant tension members ==
=== Linear structures ===
- Suspension bridges
- Stressed ribbon bridge
- Draped cables
- Cable-stayed beams or trusses
- Cable trusses
- Straight tensioned cables

=== Three-dimensional structures ===
- Bicycle wheel (can be used as a roof in a horizontal orientation)
- 3D cable trusses
- Tensegrity structures

=== Surface-stressed structures ===
- Prestressed membranes
- Pneumatically stressed membranes
- Gridshell
- Fabric structure

== Cable and membrane structures ==
=== Membrane materials ===
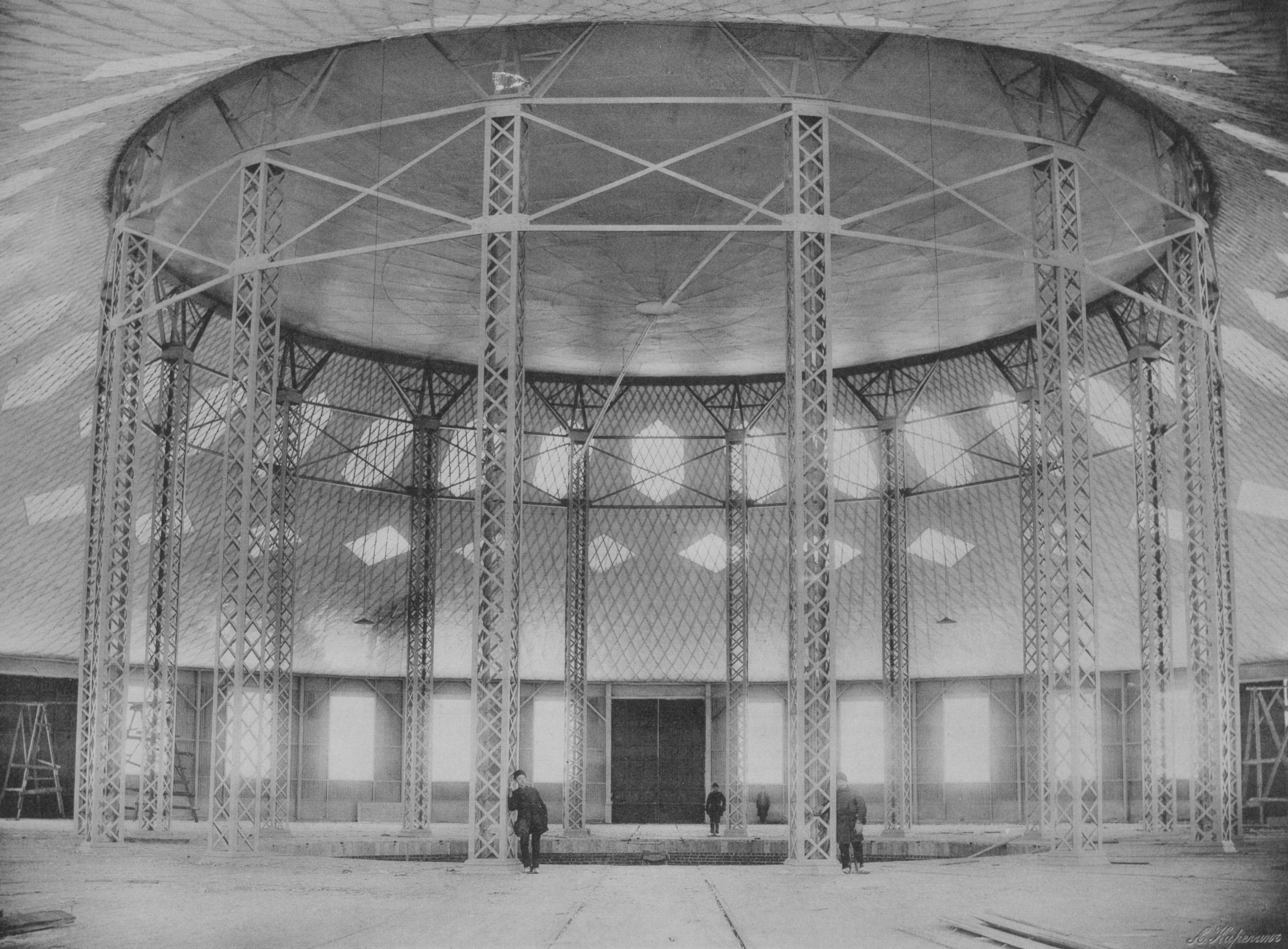
The world's first steel membrane roof and lattice steel shell in the Shukhov Rotunda, Russia, 1895

Common materials for doubly curved fabric structures are PTFE-coated fiberglass and PVC-coated polyester. These are woven materials with different strengths in different directions. The warp fibers (those fibers which are originally straight—equivalent to the starting fibers on a loom) can carry greater load than the weft or fill fibers, which are woven between the warp fibers.

Other structures make use of ETFE film, either as single layer or in cushion form (which can be inflated, to provide good insulation properties or for aesthetic effect—as on the Allianz Arena in Munich). ETFE cushions can also be etched with patterns in order to let different levels of light through when inflated to different levels.

In daylight, fabric membrane translucency offers soft diffused naturally lit spaces, while at night, artificial lighting can be used to create an ambient exterior luminescence. They are most often supported by a structural frame as they cannot derive their strength from double curvature.

=== Cables ===
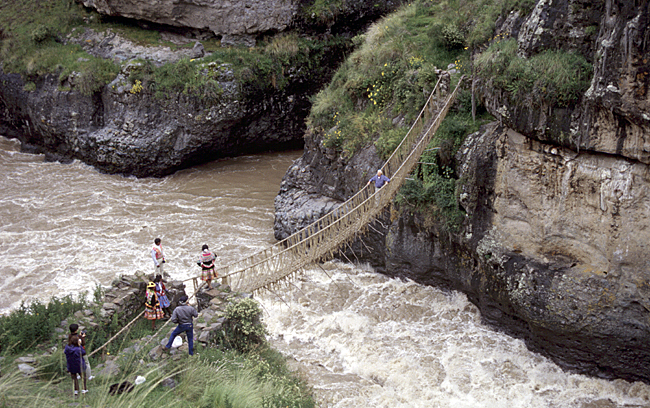
Simple suspended bridge working entirely in tension

Cables can be of mild steel, high strength steel (drawn carbon steel), stainless steel, polyester or aramid fibres. Structural cables are made of a series of small strands twisted or bound together to form a much larger cable. Steel cables are either spiral strand, where circular rods are twisted together and "glued" using a polymer, or locked coil strand, where individual interlocking steel strands form the cable (often with a spiral strand core).

Spiral strand is slightly weaker than locked coil strand. Steel spiral strand cables have a Young's modulus, E of 150±10 kN/mm^{2} (or 150±10 GPa) and come in sizes from 3 to 90 mm diameter. Spiral strand suffers from construction stretch, where the strands compact when the cable is loaded. This is normally removed by pre-stretching the cable and cycling the load up and down to 45% of the ultimate tensile load.

Locked coil strand typically has a Young's Modulus of 160±10 kN/mm^{2} and comes in sizes from 20 mm to 160 mm diameter.

The properties of the individual strands of different materials are shown in the table below, where UTS is ultimate tensile strength, or the breaking load:

Cable material	E (GPa)	UTS (MPa)	Strain at 50% of UTS
Solid steel bar	210	400–800	0.24%
Steel strand	170	1550–1770	1%
Wire rope	112	1550–1770	1.5%
Polyester fibre	7.5	910	6%
Aramid fibre	112	2800	2.5%

=== Structural forms ===
Air-supported structures are a form of tensile structures where the fabric envelope is supported by pressurised air only.

The majority of fabric structures derive their strength from their doubly curved shape. By forcing the fabric to take on double-curvature the fabric gains sufficient stiffness to withstand the loads it is subjected to (for example wind and snow loads). In order to induce an adequately doubly curved form it is most often necessary to pretension or prestress the fabric or its supporting structure.

=== Form-finding ===
The behaviour of structures which depend upon prestress to attain their strength is non-linear, so anything other than a very simple cable has, until the 1990s, been very difficult to design. The most common way to design doubly curved fabric structures was to construct scale models of the final buildings in order to understand their behaviour and to conduct form-finding exercises. Such scale models often employed stocking material or tights, or soap film, as they behave in a very similar way to structural fabrics (they cannot carry shear).

Soap films have uniform stress in every direction and require a closed boundary to form. They naturally form a minimal surface—the form with minimal area and embodying minimal energy. They are however very difficult to measure. For a large film, its weight can seriously affect its form.

For a membrane with curvature in two directions, the basic equation of equilibrium is:

$$w = \frac{t_1}{R_1} + \frac{t_2}{R_2}$$

where:

- R_{1} and R_{2} are the principal radii of curvature for soap films or the directions of the warp and weft for fabrics
- t_{1} and t_{2} are the tensions in the relevant directions
- w is the load per square metre

Lines of principal curvature have no twist and intersect other lines of principal curvature at right angles.

A geodesic or geodetic line is usually the shortest line between two points on the surface. These lines are typically used when defining the cutting pattern seam-lines. This is due to their relative straightness after the planar cloths have been generated, resulting in lower cloth wastage and closer alignment with the fabric weave.

In a pre-stressed but unloaded surface w = 0, so $\frac{t_1}{R_1} = -\frac{t_2}{R_2}$.

In a soap film surface tensions are uniform in both directions, so R_{1} = −R_{2}.

It is now possible to use powerful non-linear numerical analysis programs (or finite element analysis) to formfind and design fabric and cable structures. The programs must allow for large deflections.

The final shape, or form, of a fabric structure depends upon:

- shape, or pattern, of the fabric
- the geometry of the supporting structure (such as masts, cables, ringbeams etc.)
- the pretension applied to the fabric or its supporting structure

Hyperbolic paraboloid

It is important that the final form will not allow ponding of water, as this can deform the membrane and lead to local failure or progressive failure of the entire structure.

Snow loading can be a serious problem for membrane structure, as the snow often will not flow off the structure as water will. For example, this has in the past caused the (temporary) collapse of the Hubert H. Humphrey Metrodome, an air-inflated structure in Minneapolis, Minnesota. Some structures prone to ponding use heating to melt snow which settles on them.

Saddle Shape

There are many different doubly curved forms, many of which have special mathematical properties. The most basic doubly curved from is the saddle shape, which can be a hyperbolic paraboloid structure (not all saddle shapes are hyperbolic paraboloids). This is a double ruled surface and is often used in both in lightweight shell structures. True ruled surfaces are rarely found in tensile structures. Other forms are anticlastic saddles, various radial, conical tent forms and any combination of them.

=== Pretension ===
Pretension is tension artificially induced in the structural elements in addition to any self-weight or imposed loads they may carry. It is used to ensure that the normally very flexible structural elements remain stiff under all possible loads.

A day to day example of pretension is a shelving unit supported by wires running from floor to ceiling. The wires hold the shelves in place because they are tensioned – if the wires were slack the system would not work.

Pretension can be applied to a membrane by stretching it from its edges or by pretensioning cables which support it and hence changing its shape. The level of pretension applied determines the shape of a membrane structure.

=== Alternative form-finding approach ===
The alternative approximated approach to the form-finding problem solution is based on the total energy balance of a grid-nodal system. Due to its physical meaning this approach is called the stretched grid method (SGM).

== Simple mathematics of cables ==
=== Transversely and uniformly loaded cable ===
A uniformly loaded cable spanning between two supports forms a curve intermediate between a catenary curve and a parabola. The simplifying assumption can be made that it approximates a circular arc (of radius R).

By equilibrium:

The horizontal and vertical reactions :

$$H = \frac{wS^2}{8d}$$
$$V = \frac{wS}{2}$$

By geometry:

The length of the cable:

$$L = 2R\arcsin\frac{S}{2R}$$

The tension in the cable:

$$T = \sqrt{H^2+V^2}$$

By substitution:

$$T = \sqrt{\left(\frac{wS^2}{8d}\right)^2 + \left(\frac{wS}{2}\right)^2}$$

The tension is also equal to:

$$T = wR$$

The extension of the cable upon being loaded is (from Hooke's law, where the axial stiffness, k, is equal to $k = \frac{{EA}}{{L}}$):

$$e = \frac{TL}{EA}$$

where E is the Young's modulus of the cable and A is its cross-sectional area.

If an initial pretension, $T_0$ is added to the cable, the extension becomes:

$$e = L - L_0 = \frac{L_0(T-T_0)}{EA}$$

Combining the above equations gives:

$$\frac{L_0(T-T_0)}{EA} + L_0 = \frac{2T\arcsin\left(\frac{wS}{2T}\right)}{w}$$

By plotting the left hand side of this equation against T, and plotting the right hand side on the same axes, also against T, the intersection will give the actual equilibrium tension in the cable for a given loading w and a given pretension $T_0$.

=== Cable with central point load ===

A similar solution to that above can be derived where:

By equilibrium:

$$W = \frac{4Td}{L}$$

$$d = \frac{WL}{4T}$$

By geometry:

$$L = \sqrt{S^2 + 4d^2} = \sqrt{S^2 + 4\left(\frac{WL}{4T}\right)^2}$$

This gives the following relationship:

$$L_0 + \frac{L_0(T-T_0)}{EA} = \sqrt{S^2 + 4\left(\frac{W(L_0+\frac{L_0(T-T_0)}{EA})}{4T}\right)^2}$$

As before, plotting the left hand side and right hand side of the equation against the tension, T, will give the equilibrium tension for a given pretension, $T_0$ and load, W.

== Tensioned cable oscillations ==
The fundamental natural frequency, f_{1} of tensioned cables is given by:

$$f_1=\frac{\sqrt{\left(\frac{T}{m}\right)}}{2L}$$

where T = tension in newtons, m = mass in kilograms and L = span length.

== Notable structures ==
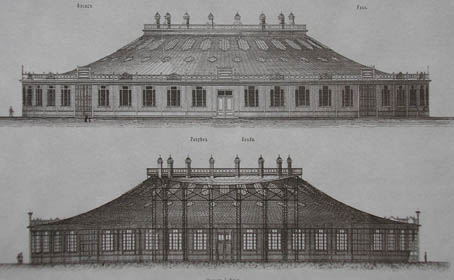
Rotunda by Vladimir Shukhov Nizhny Novgorod 1896

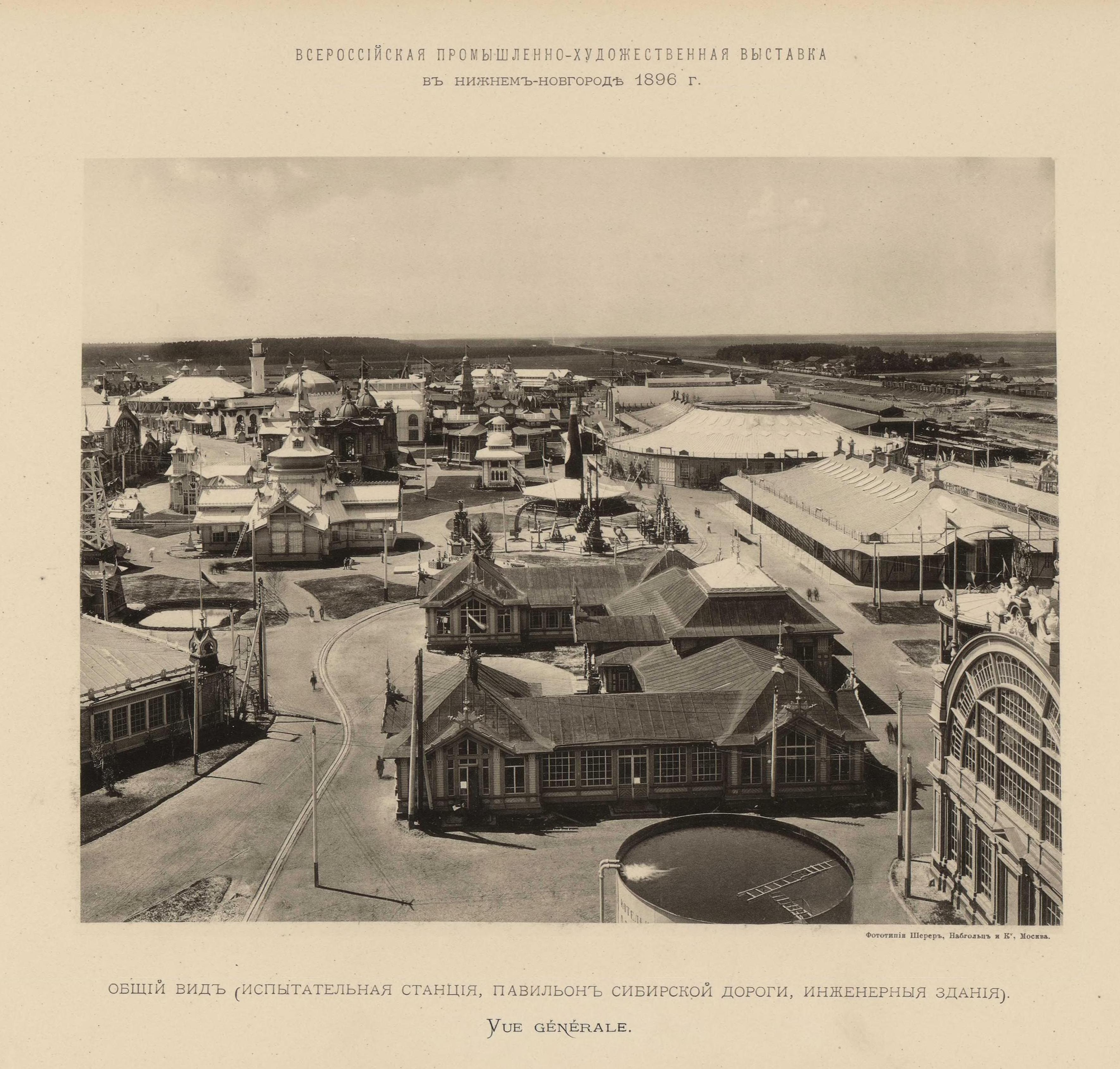
Rotunda and rectangular pavilion by Vladimir Shukhov in Nizhny Novgorod 1896

- Shukhov Rotunda, Russia, 1896
- Canada Place, Vancouver, British Columbia for Expo '86
- Yoyogi National Gymnasium by Kenzo Tange, Yoyogi Park, Tokyo, Japan
- Ingalls Rink, Yale University by Eero Saarinen
- Khan Shatyr Entertainment Center, Astana, Kazakhstan
- Tropicana Field, St. Petersburg, Florida
- Olympiapark, Munich by Frei Otto
- Sidney Myer Music Bowl, Melbourne
- The O_{2} (formerly the Millennium Dome), London by Buro Happold and Richard Rogers Partnership
- Denver International Airport, Denver
- Dorton Arena, Raleigh
- Georgia Dome, Atlanta, Georgia by Heery and Weidlinger Associates (demolished in 2017)
- Grantley Adams International Airport, Christ Church, Barbados
- Pengrowth Saddledome, Calgary by Graham McCourt Architects and Jan Bobrowski and Partners
- Scandinavium, Gothenburg, Sweden
- Hong Kong Museum of Coastal Defence
- Modernization of the Central Railway Station, Sofia, Bulgaria
- Redbird Arena, Illinois State University, Normal, Illinois
- Retractable Umbrellas, Al-Masjid an-Nabawi, Medina, Saudi Arabia
- Killesberg Tower, Stuttgart

== Gallery of well-known tensile structures ==
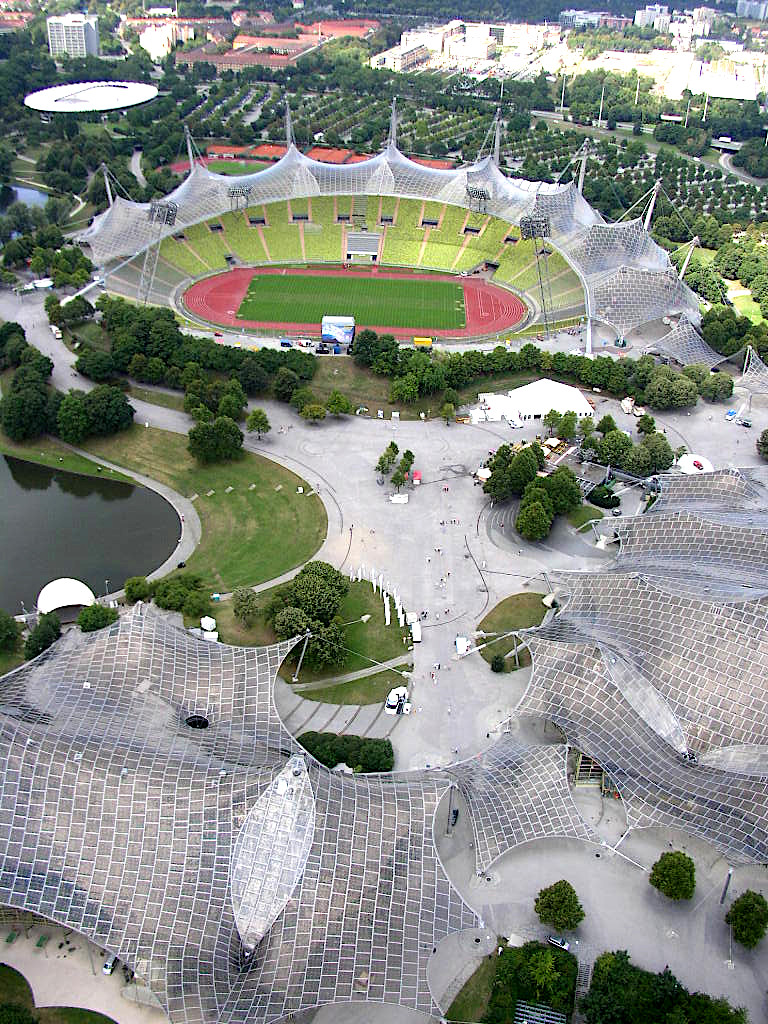
The roof tensile structures by Frei Otto of the Olympiapark, Munich

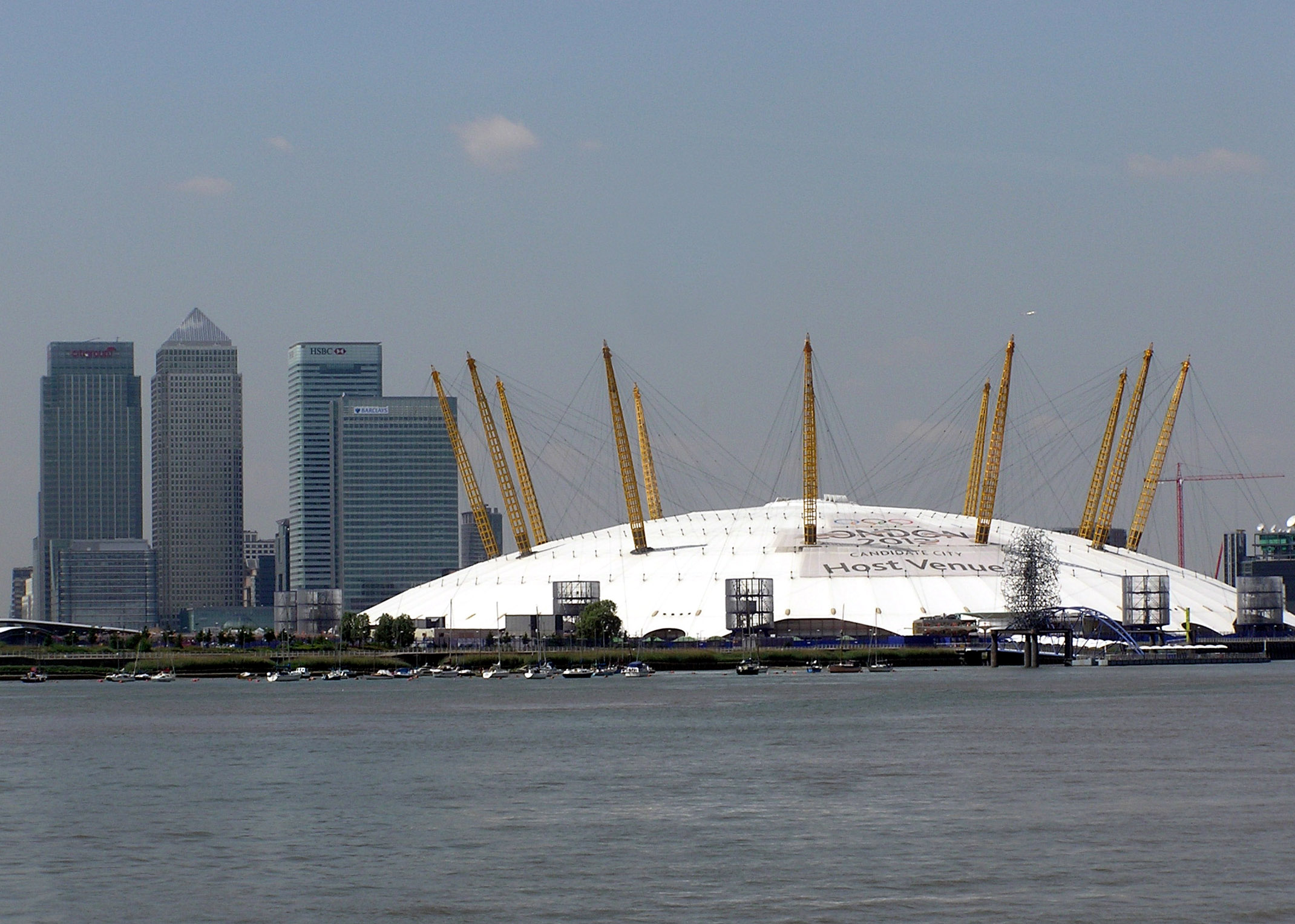
The Millennium Dome (now The O_{2}), London, by Buro Happold and Richard Rogers

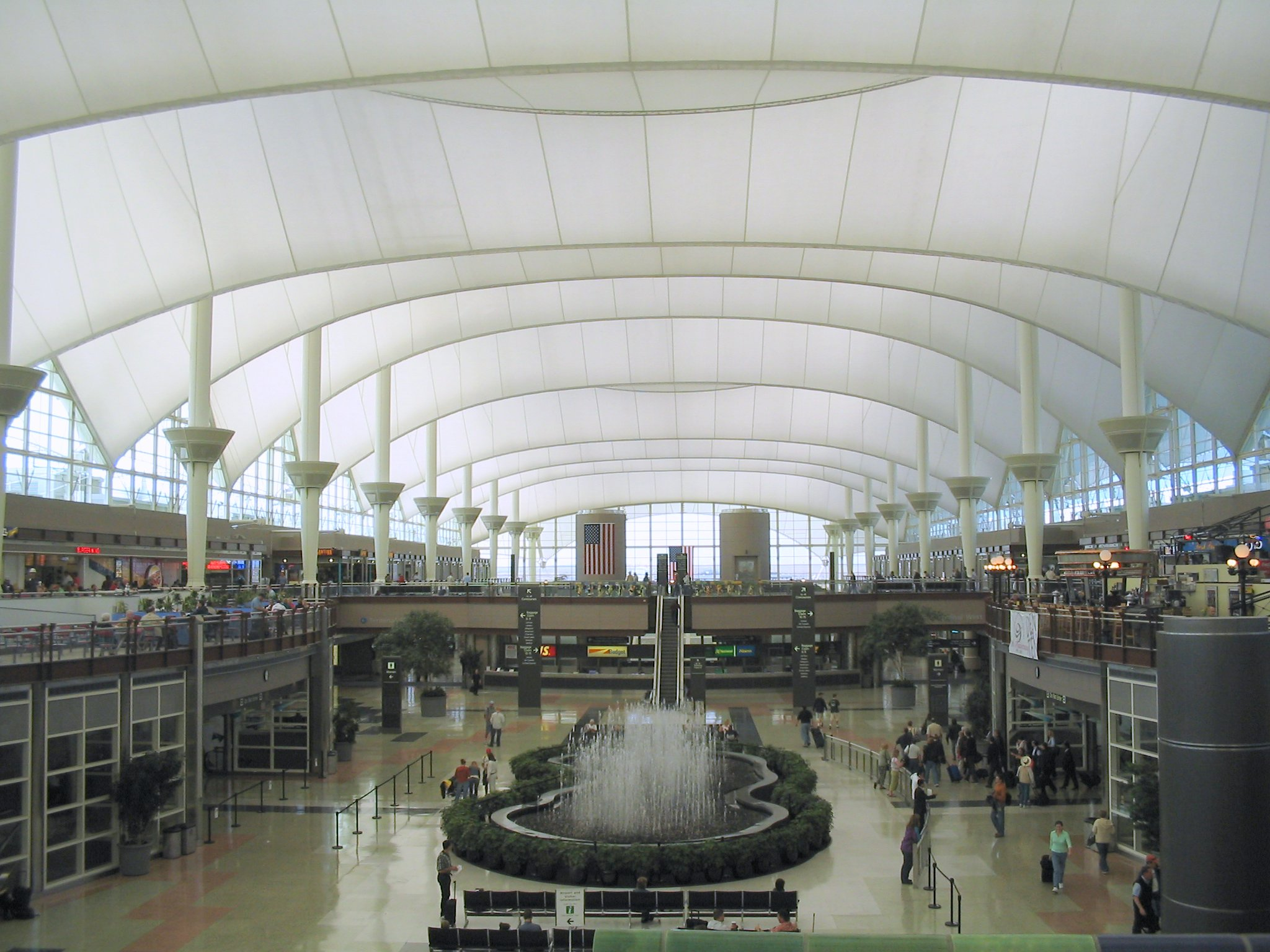
Denver International Airport terminal

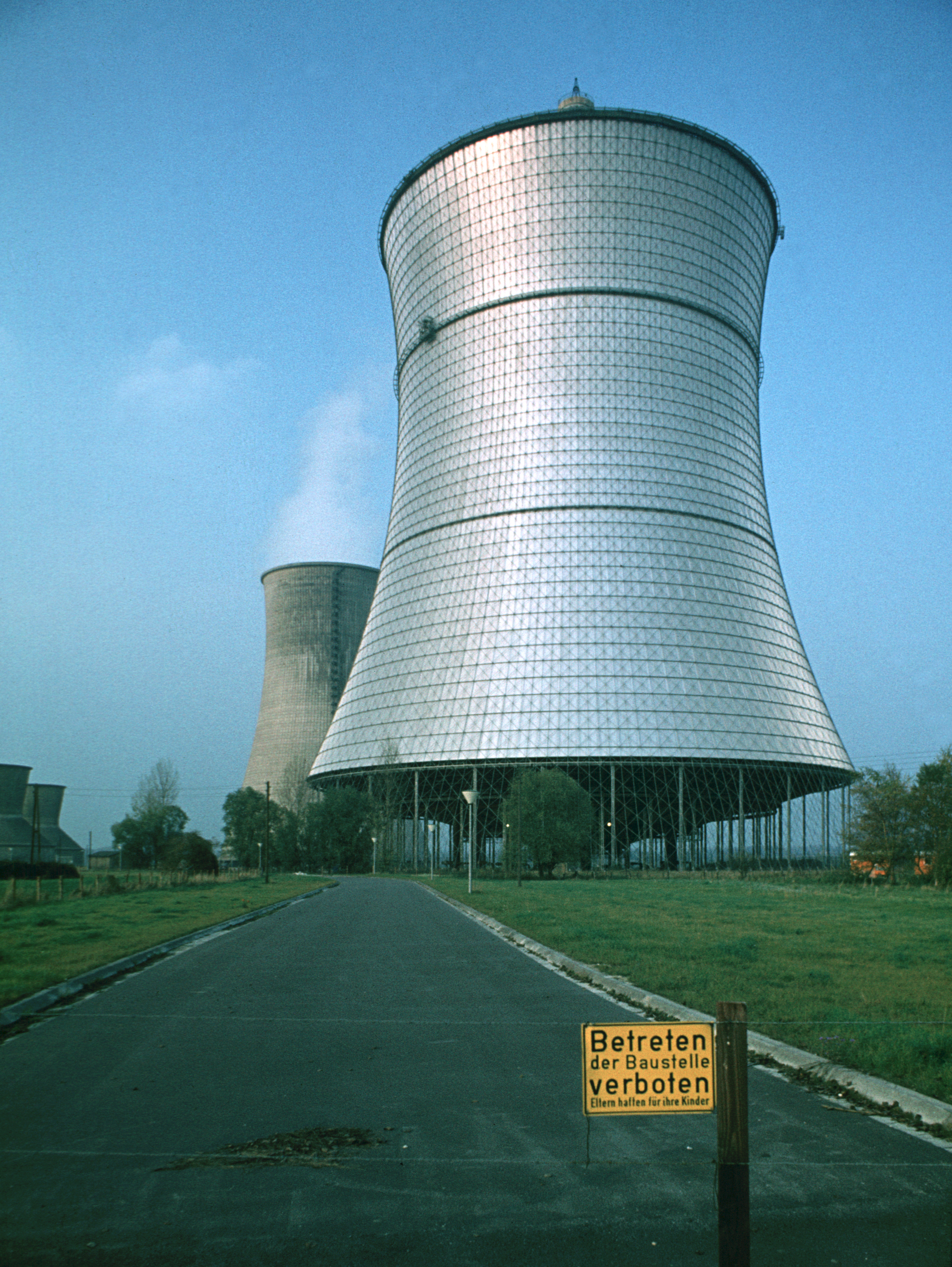
The THTR-300 cable-net dry cooling tower, hyperboloid structure by Schlaich Bergermann & Partner

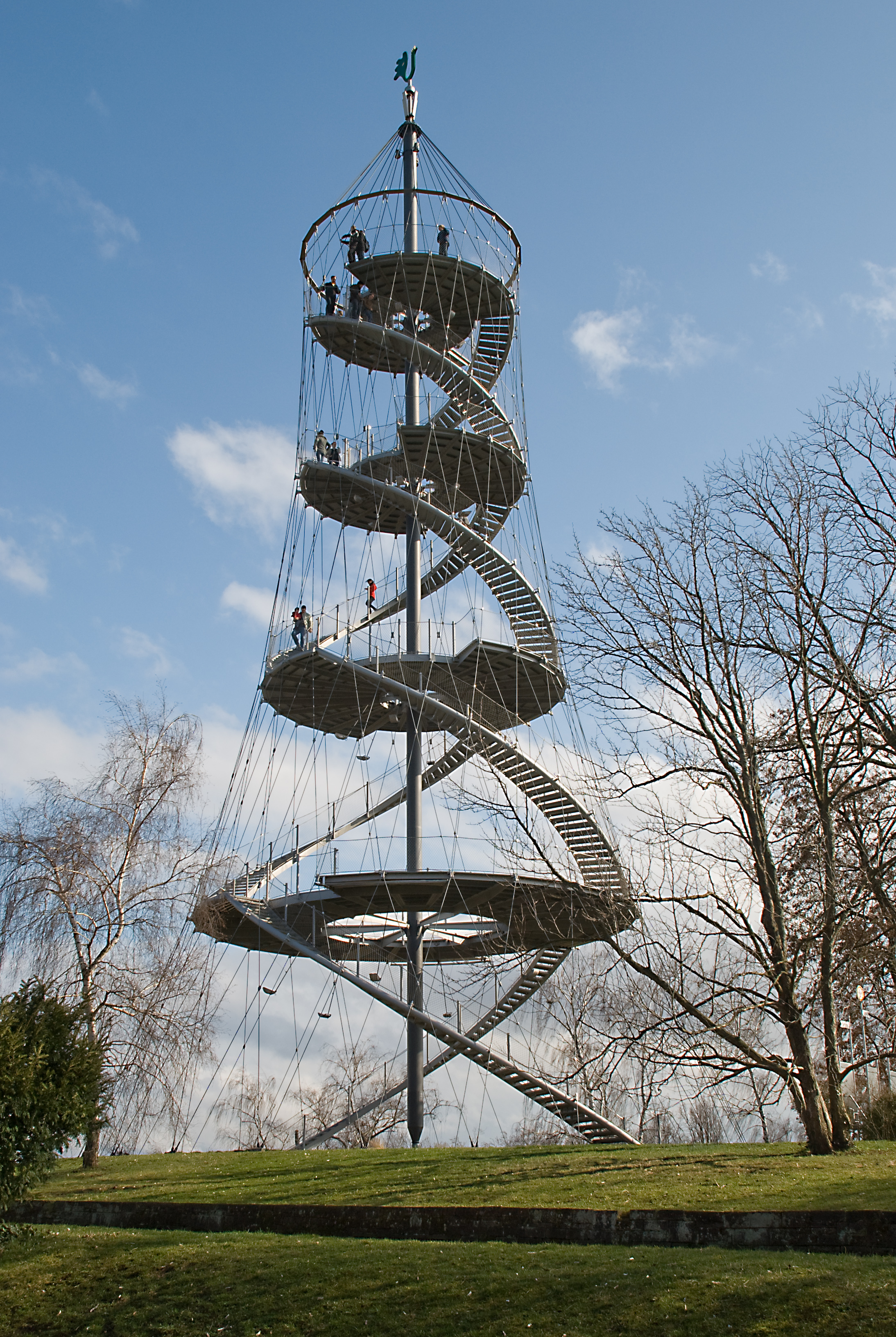
Killesberg Tower, Stuttgart, by Schlaich Bergermann Partner

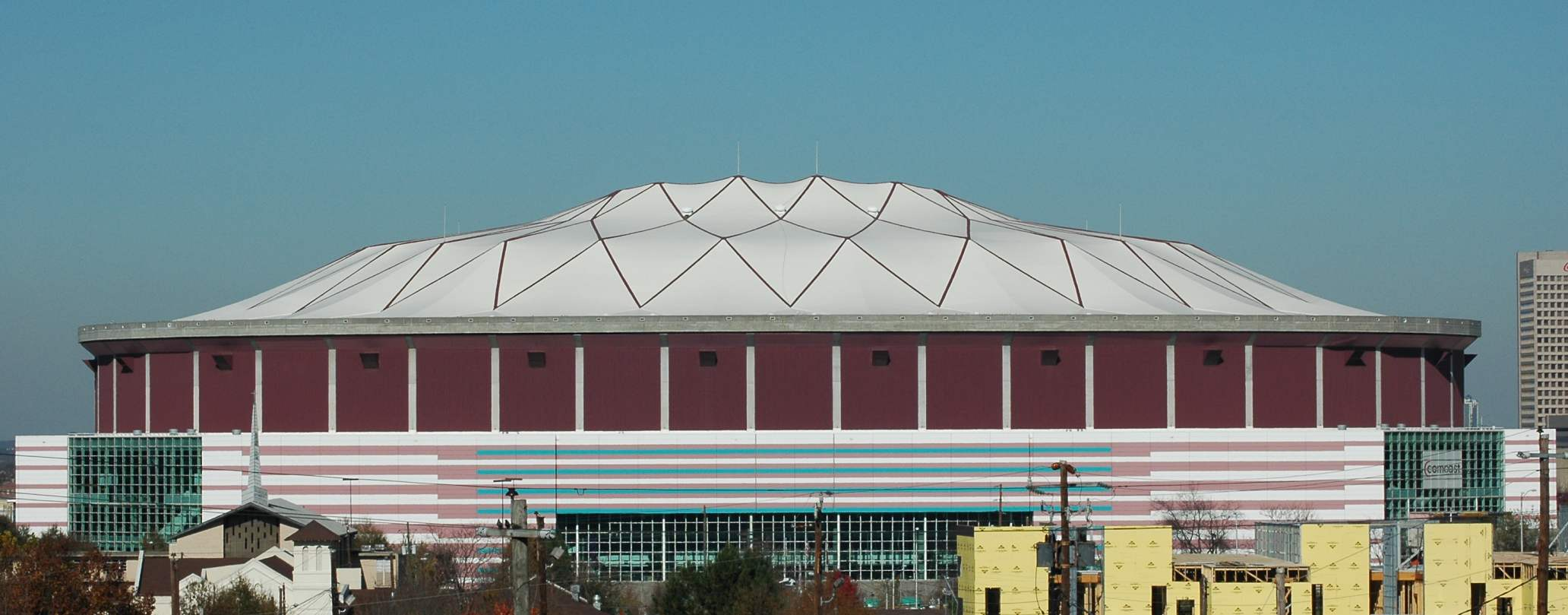
Georgia Dome in Atlanta

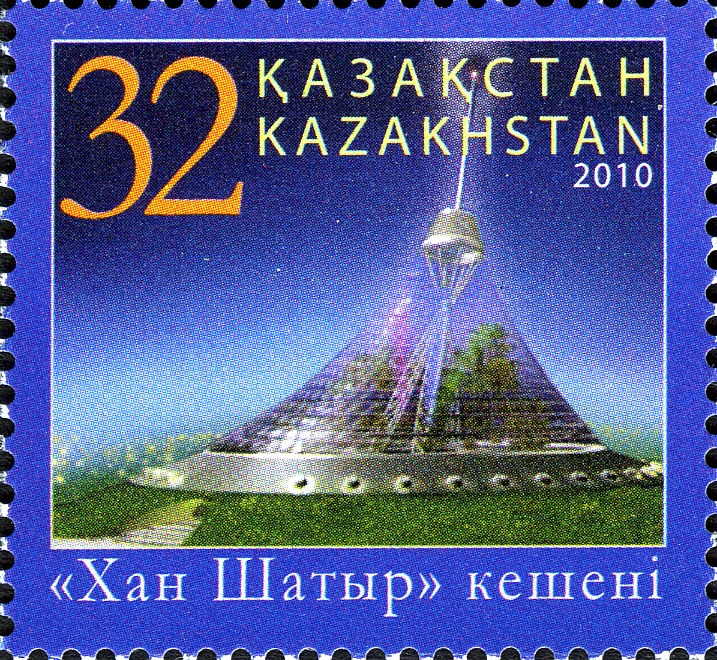
Daytime computer render of Khan Shatyr Entertainment Center, the highest tensile structure in the world

== Classification numbers ==
The Construction Specifications Institute (CSI) and Construction Specifications Canada (CSC), MasterFormat 2018 Edition, Division 05 and 13:

- 05 16 00 – Structural Cabling
- 05 19 00 - Tension Rod and Cable Truss Assemblies
- 13 31 00 – Fabric Structures
- 13 31 23 – Tensioned Fabric Structures
- 13 31 33 – Framed Fabric Structures

CSI/CSC MasterFormat 1995 Edition:

- 13120 – Cable-Supported Structures
- 13120 – Fabric Structures

== See also ==
- Buckminster Fuller
- Gaussian curvature
- Geodesic dome
- Geodesics
- Hyperboloid structure
- Kārlis Johansons
- Kenneth Snelson
- Suspended structure
- Suspension bridge
- Tensairity
- Tensegrity
- Wire rope
