= Adaptive architecture =

Adaptive architecture (also discussed as adaptable architecture or building adaptability) is an approach to designing buildings that can accommodate change over their lifecycle—in use, layout, components, or performance—rather than remaining fixed to a single programme or set of conditions.

In the research literature, building adaptability is often defined as the capacity of a building to accommodate change in response to emerging needs or varying contextual conditions, prolonging useful life while preserving value for users, or as the capacity to accommodate the evolving demands of its context and thereby maximize value through life. Change of use figures prominently in that literature; other dimensions include reconfigurable space, replaceable components, and adjustments to performance. Writers commonly treat premature obsolescence, shifting user needs, and the costs associated with demolition or major rebuilding as reasons to design for adaptation from the outset.

The idea overlaps several neighbouring fields. Responsive architecture typically describes buildings that measure environmental or occupancy conditions and adjust form or services through sensors and actuators. Kinetic architecture focuses on buildings or building parts designed to move while remaining structurally sound. Open building is a related design approach that anticipates adaptation during a building's lifetime in line with social or technological change. A 2021 review groups adaptive architecture with responsive architecture, kinetic architecture, and intelligent buildings as related strands in work on environments that interact with occupants and sensed data.

Edited collections such as Adaptive Architecture: Changing Parameters and Practice (2017) examine structures and environments meant to support multiple functions at once, in sequence, or at recurring intervals, against changing technological, economic, ecological, and social conditions.

== See also ==
- Building automation
- Climate-adaptive building shell
- Kinetic architecture
- Open building
- Responsive architecture
