= William Zuk =

American futurist

William Zuk (July 6, 1924 – July 28, 2005) was an American engineer, architect, author, teacher, and futurist. After serving in the U.S. Navy during World War II, Zuk taught at the University of Virginia for 37 years. His career there began in the Civil Engineering school in 1958. In 1964 he transferred to the School of Architecture, where he taught structures until 1992, retiring as Professor Emeritus.

He authored several books, most notably Kinetic Architecture, with co-author Roger Clark, see Kinetic architecture; numerous experimental structural engineering articles; and many technical articles. During his years at UVA, he also served as research engineer for the Virginia Department of Transportation. The term kinetic architecture was coined by Zuk and Roger H. Clark in the early 1970s, when "dynamic spatial design problems were explored in mechanical systems." (Zuk and Clark 1970).

== Education and early years ==
Zuk received his undergraduate degree (BSCE) from Cornell University in Ithaca, NY, in 1944. Upon graduation, he enlisted in the United States Navy as ensign, and was stationed in Saipan, Mariana at the end of World War II, from 1945 to 1946. Upon his return to the United States, he resumed his academic studies, completing his master's degree (MSE) at Johns Hopkins University in Baltimore in 1947. He married Constance Prymak in 1948; three children were born to the couple while they were living near Denver Colorado. Zuk brought his family east in 1953 to acquire a Doctorate (Ph.D. in Structural Engineering) from Cornell University in 1955. He subsequently moved to Charlottesville, Virginia, to begin his teaching career at the University of Virginia. His fourth child was born in Charlottesville in 1956.

== World stage ==
In 1965, Zuk and two other University of Virginia architecture faculty members won first prize in an international competition for a hotel building complex in San Sebastián, Spain. The prize-winning team consisted of designers Jan Lubicz-Nycz and Carlo Pelliccia, with Zuk serving as structural engineer.

Zuk was invited to lecture at the Herriot-Watt University in Scotland in 1969, during which time he also traveled to Spain and Puerto Rico. Following the publication of "Kinetic Architecture, he received invitations to lecture at several U.S. Universities, including Princeton, Clemson, Ball State, and MIT. And in 1973 he lectured at Roberts College in Istanbul.

Dr. Zuk enjoyed traveling throughout his life. In 1971, he took sabbatical leave from the University of Virginia for a study-tour in Japan, Hong Kong, Thailand, Nepal, India, Greece, Israel, and Italy. Also during the 1970s, he traveled to Finland, USSR, Mexico, Turkey, Egypt, Kenya, Ethiopia, England, Peru, and Brazil.

== Philosophy of kinetic architecture ==
Zuk believed that, because the natural world is in constant flux, the built environment should also become "living machines". He called his approach philosophical or contemplative, yet he offered a pragmatic application, drawing on his training in engineering. "Too often we think of buildings as simply static objects, fixed to the earth and actually becoming extensions of it. But we are living in a dynamic age, and our architecture, too, must become evermore dynamic."

"Basic to the philosophy of kinetic architecture is the importance of being able to accommodate the problem of change. Under present architectural approaches, the form is likely to become obsolete from a functional point of view long before it becomes unsound and in need of physical replacement. The physical form should not straight jacket the constant change that is taking place in the set of pressures, creating an instability between pressure and form. Architecture should be adaptive, much as natural form is, thereby encouraging the original set of pressures to grow, to transform, to change."

== Honors and memberships ==
Zuk has created an enduring legacy as a researcher and proponent of kinetic architecture. He is recognized for his achievements by the American Society of Engineering Education and the International Association of Bridge and Structural Engineers. He was a member of the Delta Chi Fraternity at Cornell University and received the Allied Profession Award from Virginia Chapter AIA in 1972. He was chosen as the outstanding Ukrainian American of Maryland in 1973.

Zuk was included in the 39th Biennial Edition of Who's Who In America. He served as Research Engineer for the Virginia Department of Transportation, Transportation Research Council, for 35 years (1958-1993). The William Zuk Memorial Lecture was created at the University of Virginia to recognize his legacy.

== Influence and legacy ==
Zuk and Clark's Kinetic Architecture was "the first book to comprehensively articulate definitions, design philosophy, and architectural application of kinetics." The book was "a pragmatic manual for the Archigram inspired generation eager to create a new, continuously moving, shape-changing reality".

Dynamic architecture, as it turns out, is a very broad topic. As Zuk states in Kinetic Architecture, "our present task is to unfreeze architecture, to make it a fluid, vibrating, changeable backdrop for the varied and constantly changing modes of life. An expanding, contracting, pulsating, changing architecture would reflect life as it is today and therefore be a part of it".

== Books and publications ==
Zuk, William. Concepts of Structures, 1963, Reinhold Publishing Corporation, Library of Congress Catalog Card No. 63-11425
Zuk, William and Clark, Roger H. Kinetic Architecture, 1970, Van Nostrand Reinhold Company, Library of Congress Card Catalog No. 74-108655.
Zuk, William. "The Next 100 Years of Architecture," The Futurist magazine, November–December 1994, pages 16-19

- Numerous publications as Research Engineer with the Virginia Highway & Transportation Research Council, including:

Zuk, William. Fold-up Concrete Construction, 1975
Zuk, William. Smart Technology as Applied to Bridges, 1993
Zuk, William. Final Report, Robotics in Construction, 1985
