= Kinetic architecture =

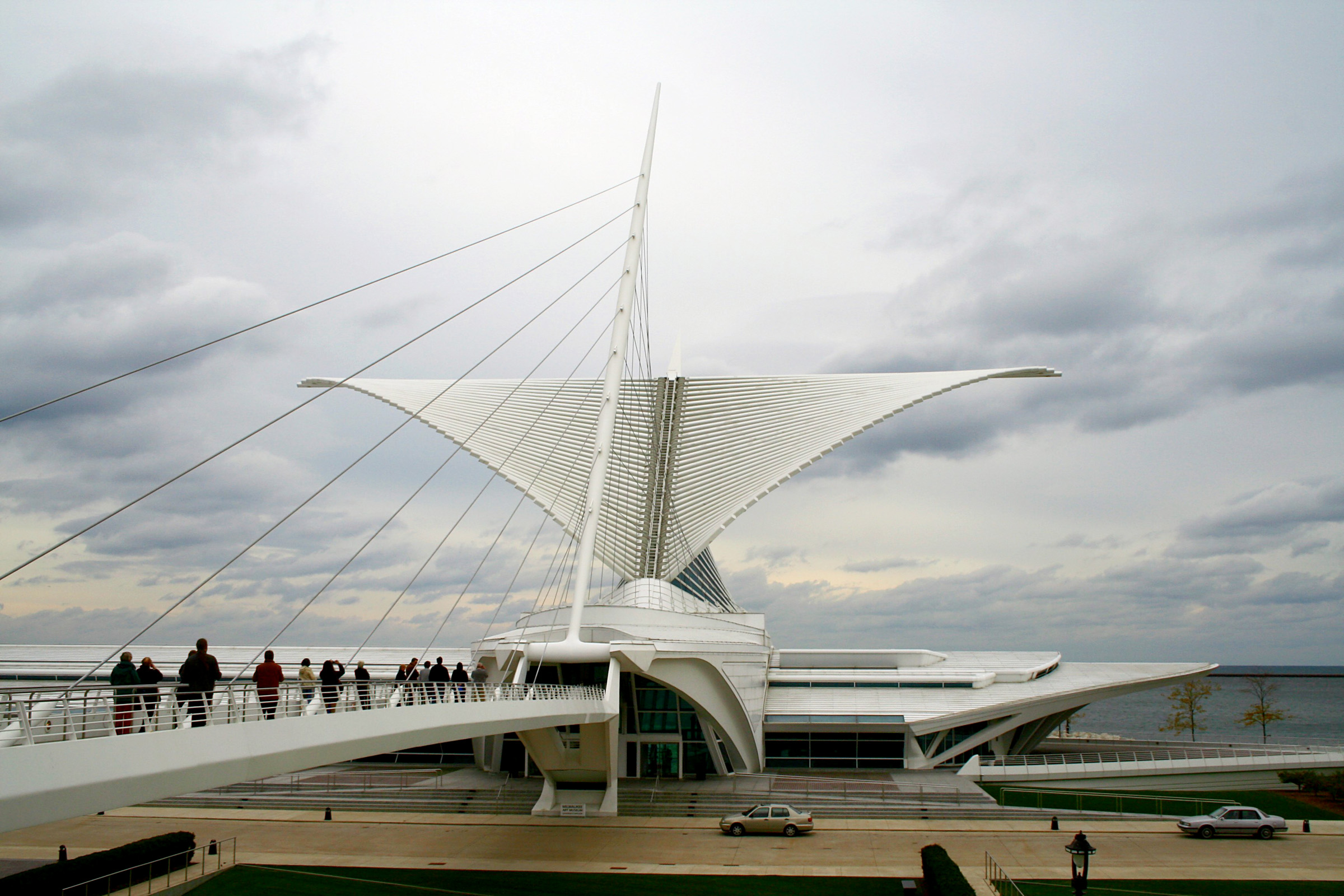
The Burke Brise soleil sits atop the Milwaukee Art Museum – it folds its wings over the museum to protect it at night and can also use its wings to shield visitors from the sun or from rain storms.

Kinetic architecture is a concept through which buildings are designed to allow parts of the structure to move, without reducing overall structural integrity.

A building's capability for motion can be used just to: enhance its aesthetic qualities; respond to environmental conditions; and/or, perform functions that would be impossible for a static structure.

The possibilities for practical implementations of kinetic architecture increased sharply in the late 20th century due to advances in mechanics, electronics, and robotics.

== History ==
An early instance of kinetic architecture – the drawbridge

Rudimentary forms of kinetic architecture such as the drawbridge can be traced back to the Middle Ages or earlier. Yet it was only in the early 20th century that architects began to widely discuss the possibility for movement to be enabled for a significant portion of a buildings' superstructure. In the first third of the 20th century, interest in kinetic architect was one of the stands of thought emerging from the Futurism movement. Various papers and books included plans and drawings for moving buildings, a notable example being Chernikhov's 101 Architectural Fantasies (1933). For the first few decades of the 20th century kinetic architecture was almost entirely theoretical, but by the 1940s innovators such as Buckminster Fuller began experimenting with concrete implementations, though his early efforts in this direction are not regarded as totally successful.

In 1970, engineer/architect William Zuk published the book Kinetic architecture, which helped inspire a new generation of architects to design an increasingly wide range of actual working kinetic buildings. Assisted by new concepts such as Fuller's Tensegrity and by developments in robotics, kinetic buildings have become increasingly common worldwide since the 1980s.

== Themes ==
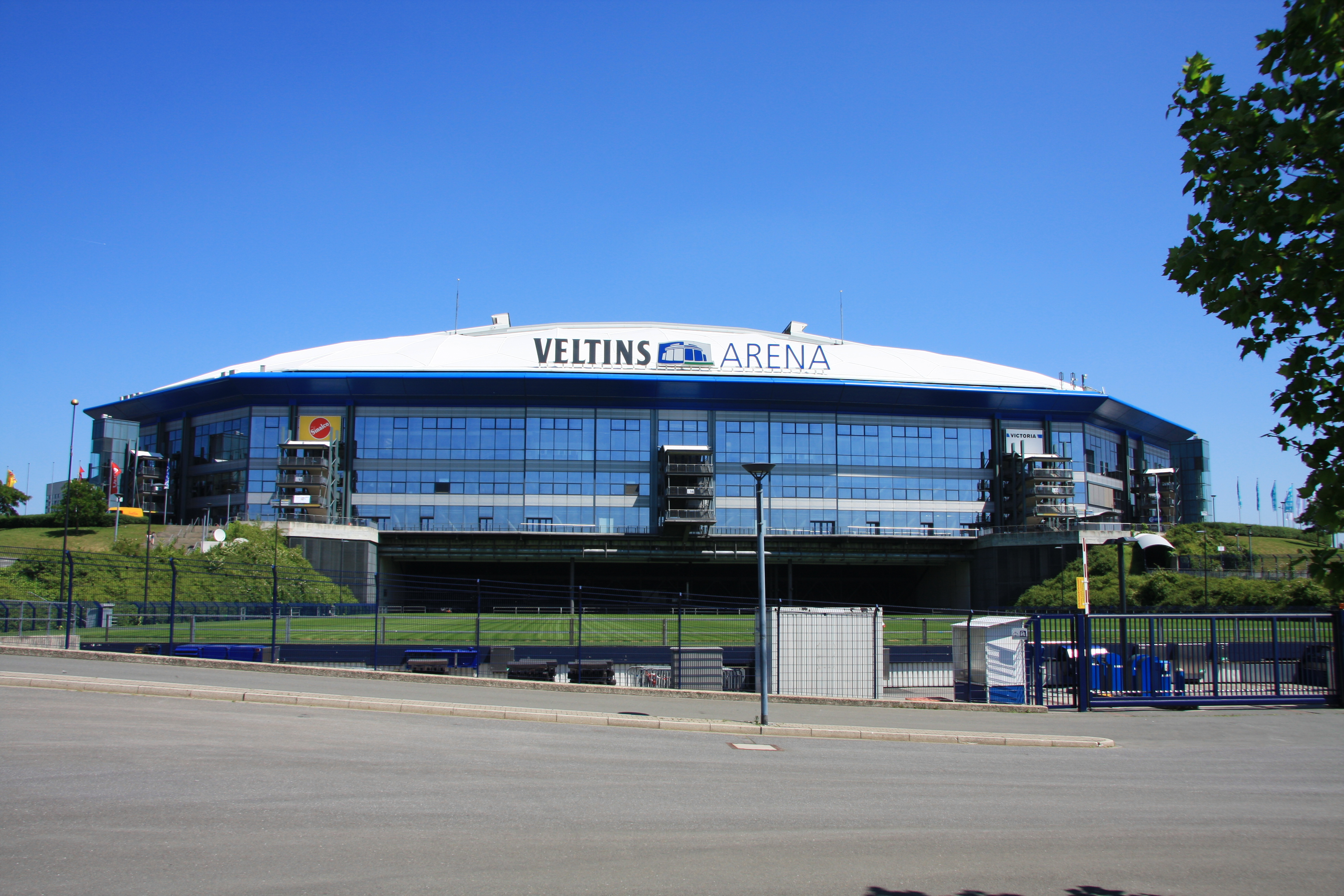
The Veltins-Arena in Gelsenkirchen, Germany is an example of a stadium with a retractable roof and a retractable pitch

By the early 21st century three interrelated themes had emerged. The first is for functional buildings such as bridges which can elevate their midsections to allow tall ships to pass, or stadiums with retractable roofs such as the Veltins-Arena, Millennium Stadium in Cardiff, or Wembley Stadium.

A second theme is for fantastic structures that can perform Transformer style changes of shape or which have a visually stunning appearance. The bird-like Burke Brise soleil at the Milwaukee Art Museum is a well regarded example of this, though it also has a functional aspect in that its movement allows it to shade the crowds from the sun or protect them from storms.

The third theme is for movement to occur on the surface of the building, creating what Buckminster Fuller called a "skin-like articulation" effect. A classic example of this is the Institut du Monde Arabe.

== Other uses of the term ==
Architects Sarah Bonnemaison and Christine Macy have suggested that movement can be an inspiring idea for architecture without the designs having to allow for actual movement – they can merely suggest it as was the case for some of the constructions of Gaudi or their own recent work. The term Kinetic architecture can also refer to static buildings designed to accentuate human movement, such as the performing arts. The phrase has been chosen as a title for performing groups including a dance company.

== See also ==
- Responsive architecture
