= Tensegrity =

Structural design made of isolated members held in place by tension

Stereo image
Right frame
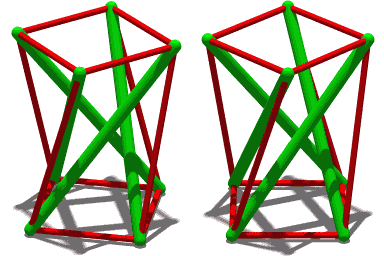
Left frame
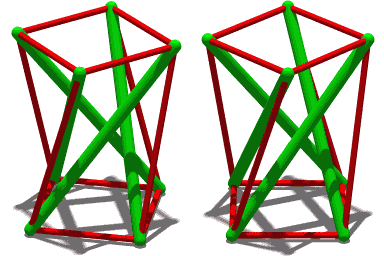
Cross-eye view
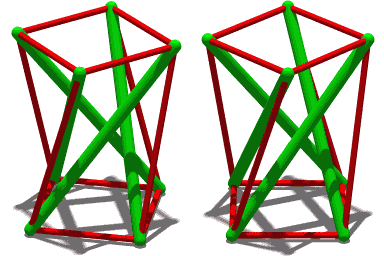
Parallel view
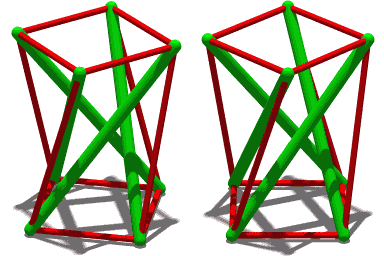

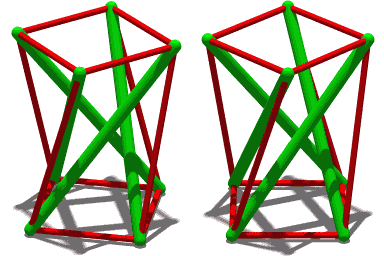
- Animation A similar structure but with four compression members.

The simplest tensegrity structure (a T3-prism). Each of three compression members (green) is symmetric with the other two, and symmetric from end to end. Each end is connected to three cables (red), which provide tension and precisely define the position of that end in the same way as the three cables in the Skylon define the bottom end of its tapered pillar.

Tensegrity, tensional integrity or floating compression is a structural principle based on a system of isolated components under compression inside a network of continuous tension, and arranged in such a way that the compressed members (usually bars or struts) do not touch each other while the prestressed tensioned members (usually cables or tendons) constrain the system spatially.

Tensegrity structures are found in both nature and human-made objects: in the human body, the bones are held in compression while the connective tissues are held in tension, and the same principles have been applied to furniture and architectural design and beyond.

The term was coined by Buckminster Fuller in the 1960s as a portmanteau of "tensional integrity".

== Applications ==
=== Architecture ===
==== Sculptures ====
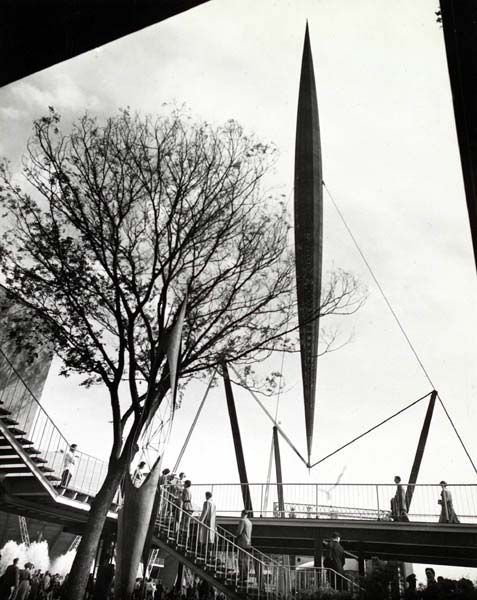
The Skylon at the Festival of Britain, 1951

A conceptual building block of tensegrity is seen in the 1951 Skylon. Six cables, three at each end, hold the tower in position. The three cables connected to the bottom "define" its location. The other three cables are simply keeping it vertical.

A three-rod tensegrity structure (shown above in a spinning drawing of a T3-Prism) builds on this simpler structure: the ends of each green rod look like the top and bottom of the Skylon. As long as the angle between any two cables is smaller than 180°, the position of the rod is well defined. While three cables are the minimum required for stability, additional cables can be attached to each node for aesthetic purposes and for redundancy. For example, Kenneth Snelson's Needle Tower uses a repeated pattern built using nodes that are connected to five cables each.

Art historian Eleanor Heartney points out visual transparency as an important aesthetic quality of these structures. Korkmaz et al. has argued that lightweight tensegrity structures are suitable for adaptive architecture.

==== Buildings and bridges ====
Tensegrities saw increased application in architecture beginning in the 1960s, when Maciej Gintowt and Maciej Krasiński designed Spodek arena complex (in Katowice, Poland), as one of the first major structures to employ the principle of tensegrity. The roof uses an inclined surface held in check by a system of cables holding up its circumference. Tensegrity principles were also used in David Geiger's Seoul Olympic Gymnastics Arena (for the 1988 Summer Olympics), and the Georgia Dome (for the 1996 Summer Olympics). Tropicana Field, home of the Tampa Bay Rays major league baseball team, also has a dome roof supported by a large tensegrity structure.

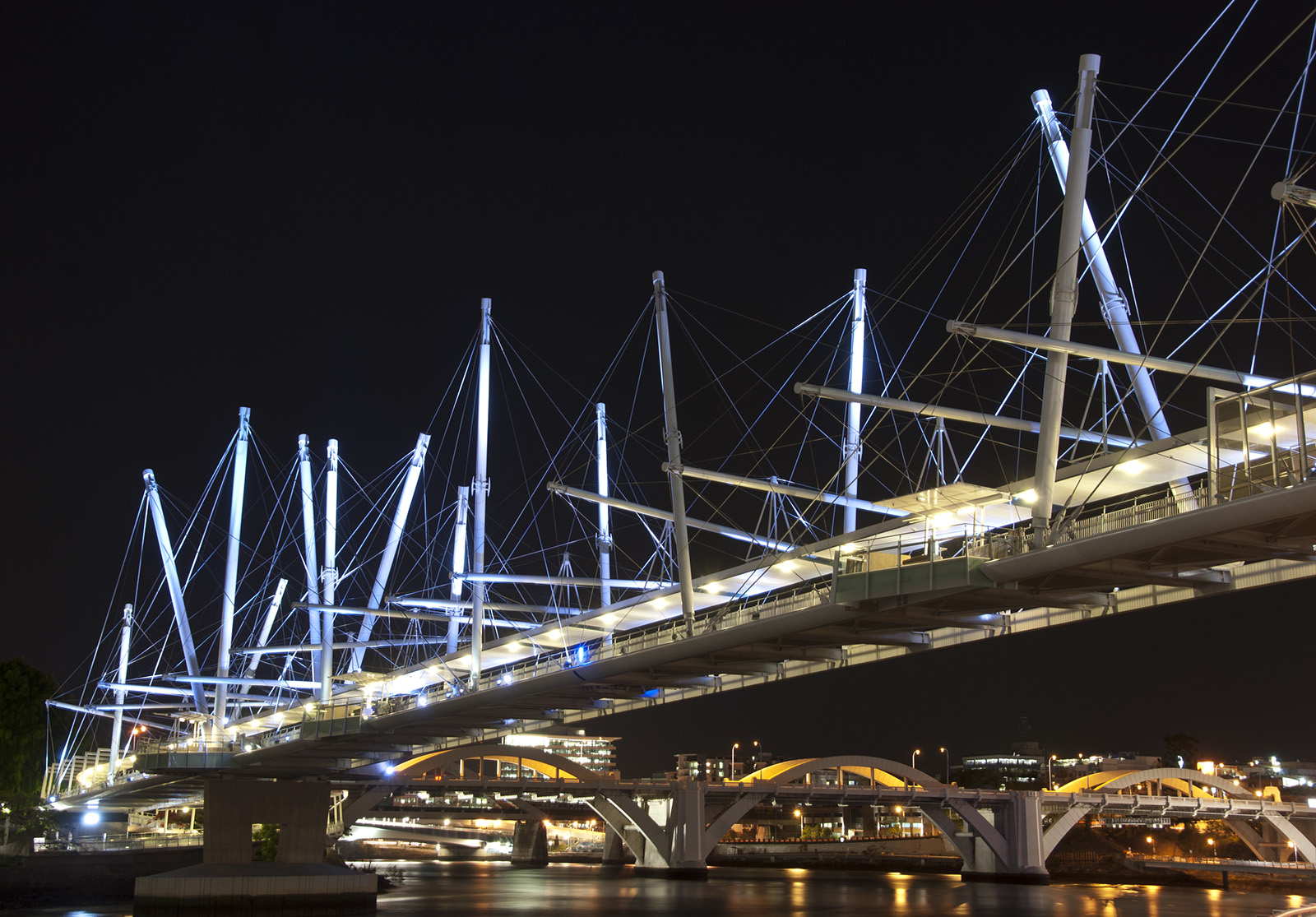
Largest tensegrity bridge in the world, Kurilpa Bridge – Brisbane

On 4 October 2009, the Kurilpa Bridge opened across the Brisbane River in Queensland, Australia. A multiple-mast, cable-stay structure based on the principles of tensegrity, it is currently the world's largest tensegrity bridge.

=== Robotics ===
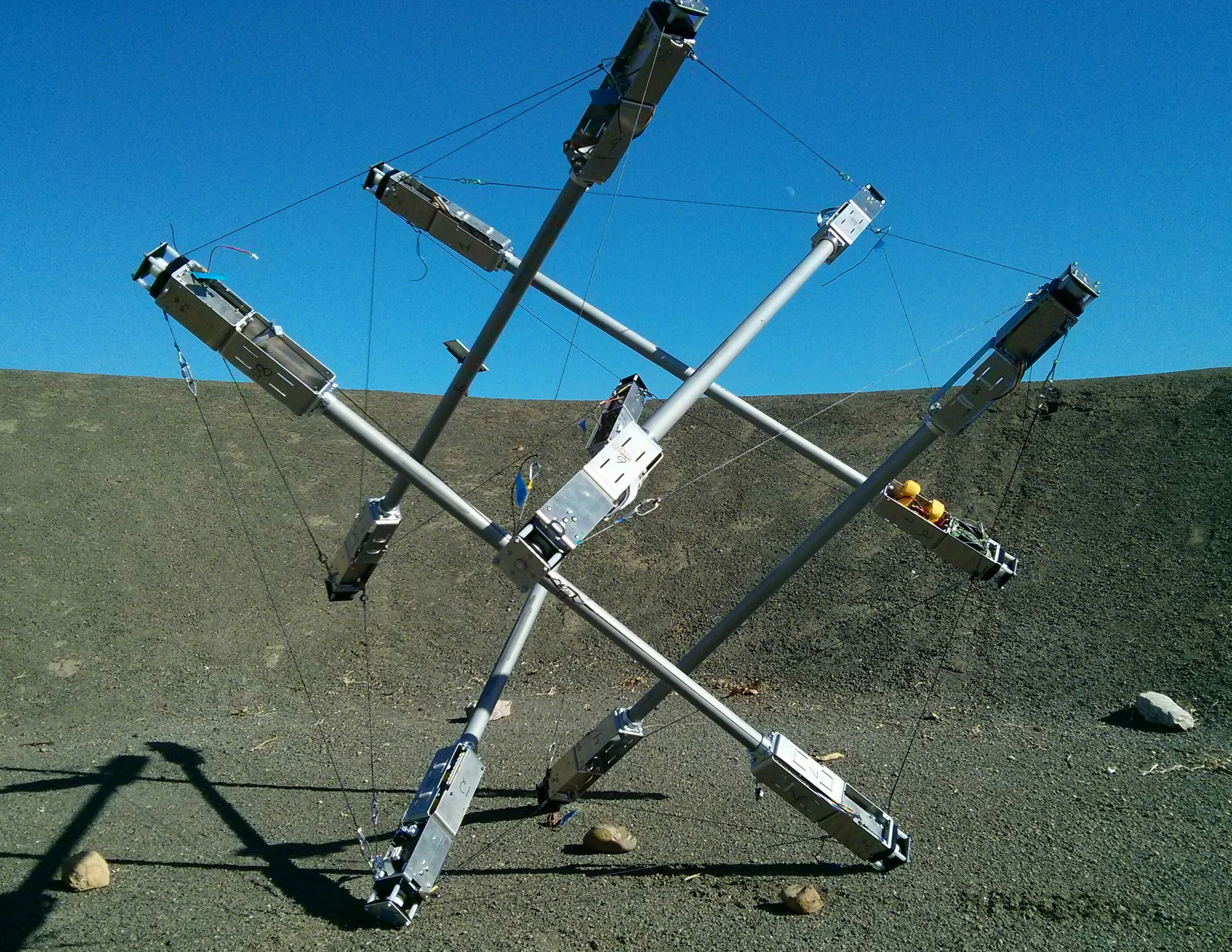
NASA's Super Ball Bot is an early prototype, designed to land on another planet without an airbag, and then be mobile to explore. The tensegrity structure provides structural compliance absorbing landing impact forces and motion is applied by changing cable lengths. (Shown on Earth in 2014.)

Since the early 2000s, tensegrities have also attracted the interest of roboticists due to their potential to design lightweight and resilient robots. Numerous researches have investigated tensegrity rovers, bio-mimicking robots, and modular soft robots. The most famous tensegrity robot is the Super Ball Bot, a rover for space exploration using a 6-bar tensegrity structure, currently under developments at NASA Ames.

=== Anatomy ===
Biotensegrity, a term coined by Stephen Levin, is an extended theoretical application of tensegrity principles to biological structures. Biological structures such as muscles, bones, fascia, ligaments and tendons, or rigid and elastic cell membranes, are made strong by the unison of tensioned and compressed parts. The musculoskeletal system consists of a continuous network of muscles and connective tissues where the bones provide discontinuous compressive support, whilst the nervous system maintains tension in vivo through electrical stimulus. Levin claims that the human spine is also a tensegrity structure.

=== Biochemistry ===
Donald E. Ingber has developed a theory of tensegrity to describe numerous phenomena observed in molecular biology. For instance, the expressed shapes of cells, whether it be their reactions to applied pressure, interactions with substrates, etc., all can be mathematically modelled by representing the cell's cytoskeleton as a tensegrity. Furthermore, geometric patterns found throughout nature (the helix of DNA, the geodesic dome of a volvox, Buckminsterfullerene, and more) may also be understood based on applying the principles of tensegrity to the spontaneous self-assembly of compounds, proteins, and even organs. This view is supported by how the tension-compression interactions of tensegrity minimize material needed to maintain stability and achieve structural resiliency, although the comparison with inert materials within a biological framework has no widely accepted premise within physiological science. Therefore, natural selection pressures would likely favor biological systems organized in a tensegrity manner.

As Ingber explains:

The tension-bearing members in these structures – whether Fuller's domes or Snelson's sculptures – map out the shortest paths between adjacent members (and are therefore, by definition, arranged geodesically). Tensional forces naturally transmit themselves over the shortest distance between two points, so the members of a tensegrity structure are precisely positioned to best withstand stress. For this reason, tensegrity structures offer a maximum amount of strength.

In embryology, Richard Gordon proposed that embryonic differentiation waves are propagated by an 'organelle of differentiation' where the cytoskeleton is assembled in a bistable tensegrity structure at the apical end of cells called the 'cell state splitter'.

== Origins and art history ==
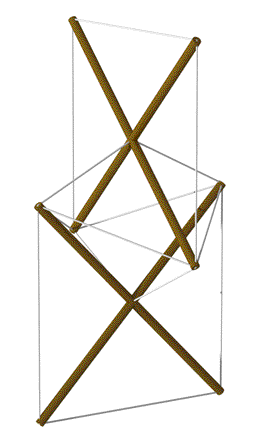
Kenneth Snelson's 1948 X-Module Design as embodied in a two-module column

The origins of tensegrity are not universally agreed upon. Many traditional structures, such as skin-on-frame kayaks and shōji, use tension and compression elements in a similar fashion.

Russian artist Viatcheslav Koleichuk claimed that the idea of tensegrity was invented first by Kārlis Johansons, a Soviet avant-garde artist of Latvian descent, who contributed some works to the main exhibition of Russian constructivism in 1921. Koleichuk's claim was backed up by Maria Gough for one of the works at the 1921 constructivist exhibition. Snelson has acknowledged the constructivists as an influence for his work. French engineer David Georges Emmerich has also noted how Johansons's work (and industrial design ideas) seemed to foresee tensegrity concepts. Images from 1921 are show the first Simplex structures (made with 3 bars and 9 tendons) developed by Johansons.

In 1948, artist Kenneth Snelson produced his innovative "X-Piece" after artistic explorations at Black Mountain College (where Buckminster Fuller was lecturing) and elsewhere. Some years later, the term "tensegrity" was coined by Fuller, who is best known for his geodesic domes. Throughout his career, Fuller had experimented with incorporating tensile components in his work, such as in the framing of his dymaxion houses.

Snelson's 1948 innovation spurred Fuller to immediately commission a mast from Snelson. In 1949, Fuller developed a tensegrity-icosahedron based on the technology, and he and his students quickly developed further structures and applied the technology to building domes. After a hiatus, Snelson also went on to produce a plethora of sculptures based on tensegrity concepts. His main body of work began in 1959 when a pivotal exhibition at the Museum of Modern Art took place. At the MOMA exhibition, Fuller had shown the mast and some of his other work. At this exhibition, Snelson, after a discussion with Fuller and the exhibition organizers regarding credit for the mast, also displayed some work in a vitrine.

Snelson's best-known piece is his 26.5-meter-high (87-foot) Needle Tower of 1968.

== Mathematics of tensegrity ==
The loading of at least some tensegrity structures causes an auxetic response and negative Poisson ratio, e.g. the T3-prism and 6-strut tensegrity icosahedron.

=== Tensegrity prisms ===
The three-rod tensegrity structure (3-way prism) has the property that, for a given (common) length of compression member "rod" (there are three total) and a given (common) length of tension cable "tendon" (six total) connecting the rod ends together, there is a particular value for the (common) length of the tendon connecting the rod tops with the neighboring rod bottoms that causes the structure to hold a stable shape. For such a structure, it is straightforward to prove that the triangle formed by the rod tops and that formed by the rod bottoms are rotated with respect to each other by an angle of 5π/6 (radians).

The stability ("prestressability") of several 2-stage tensegrity structures are analyzed by Sultan, et al.

The T3-prism (also known as Triplex) can be obtained through form finding of a straight triangular prism. Its self-equilibrium state is given when the base triangles are in parallel planes separated by an angle of twist of π/6. The formula for its unique self-stress state is given by,
$$\omega = \omega_1 [-\sqrt{3}, -\sqrt{3}, -\sqrt{3}, \sqrt{3}, \sqrt{3}, \sqrt{3}, 1, 1, 1, 1, 1, 1]^T$$
Here, the first three negative values correspond to the inner components in compression, while the rest correspond to the cables in tension.

=== Tensegrity icosahedra ===
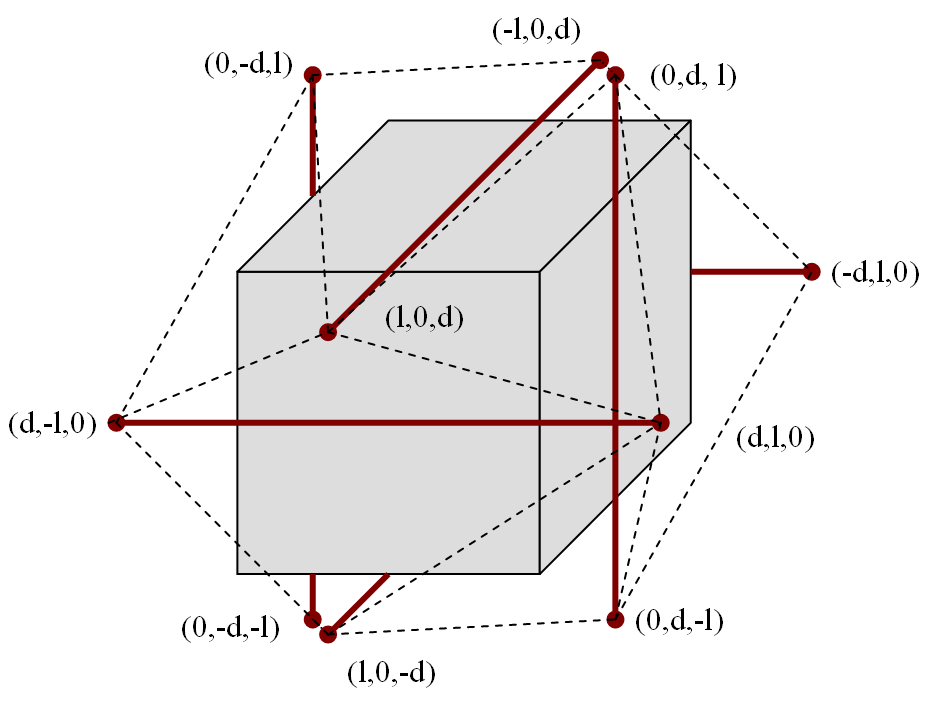
Mathematical model of the tensegrity icosahedron

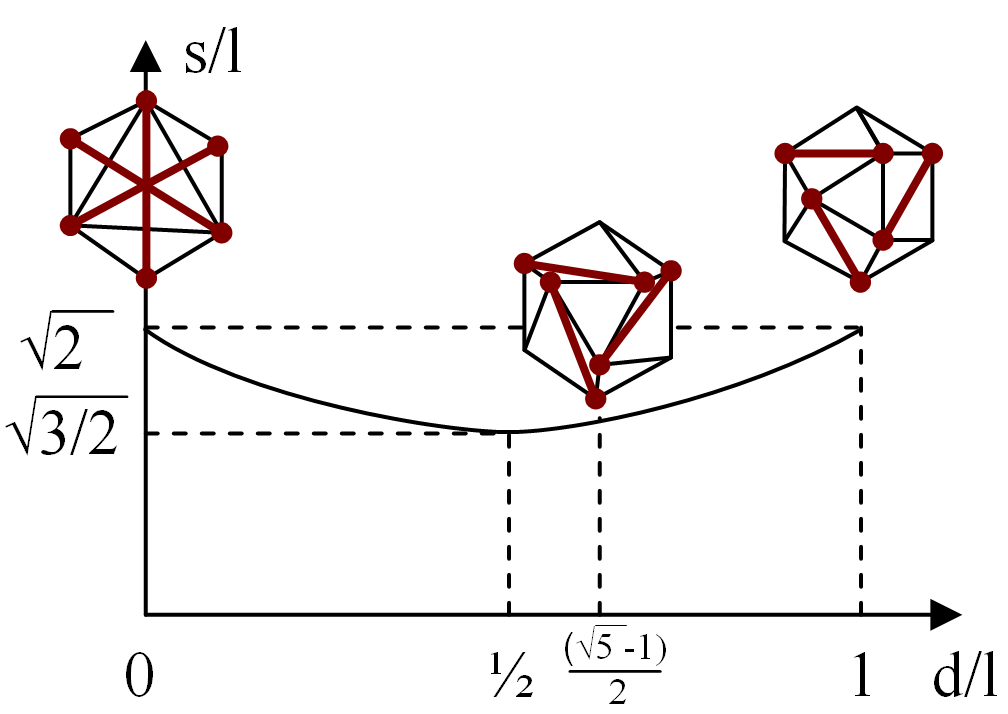
Different shapes of tensegrity icosahedra, depending on the ratio between the lengths of the tendons and the struts

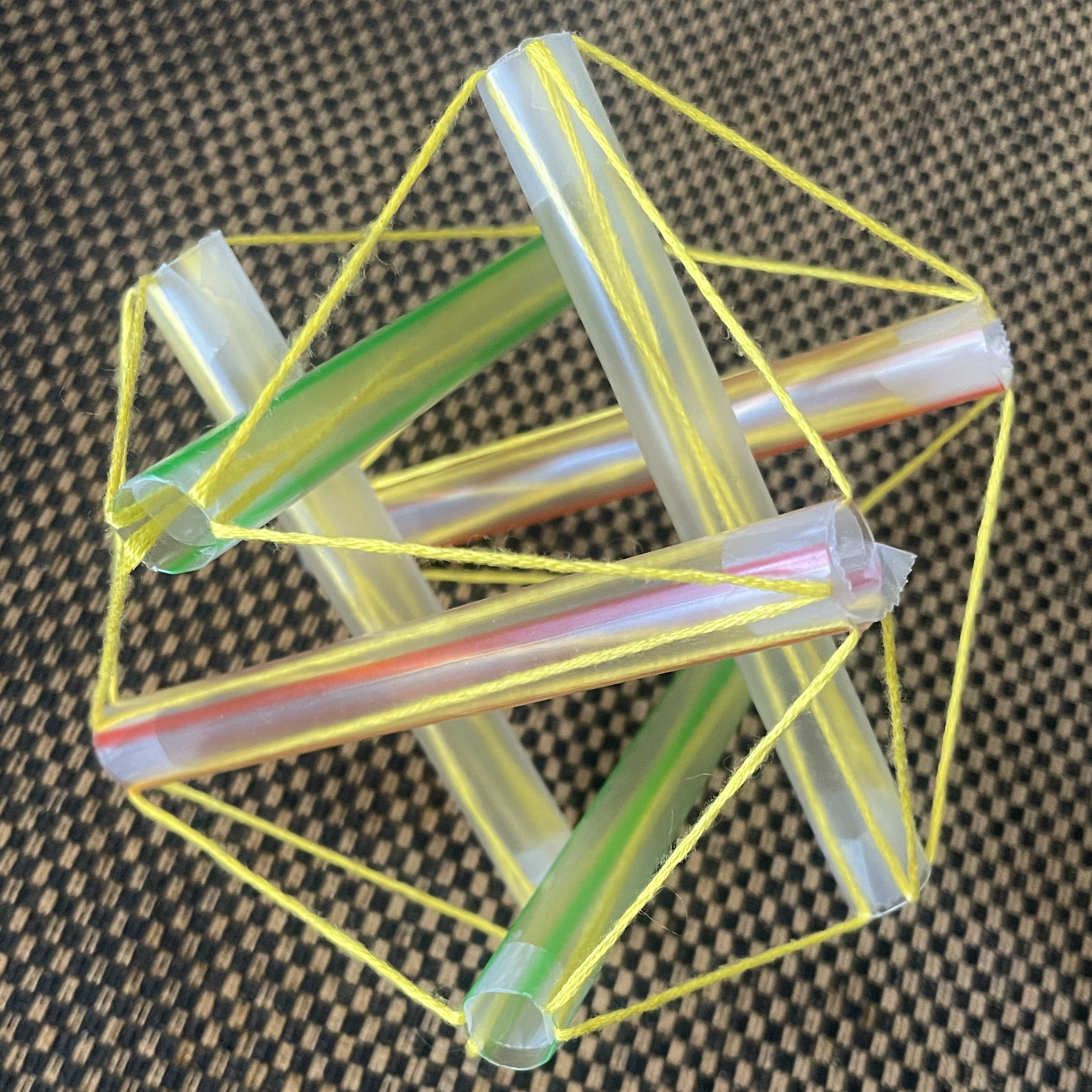
A tensegrity icosahedron made from straws and string

The tensegrity icosahedron, first studied by Snelson in 1949, has struts and tendons along the edges of a polyhedron called Jessen's icosahedron. It is a stable construction, albeit with infinitesimal mobility. To see this, consider a cube of side length 2d, centered at the origin. Place a strut of length 2l in the plane of each cube face, such that each strut is parallel to one edge of the face and is centered on the face. Moreover, each strut should be parallel to the strut on the opposite face of the cube, but orthogonal to all other struts. If the Cartesian coordinates of one strut are $(0, d, l)$ and $(0, d, -l)$, those of its parallel strut will be, respectively, $(0, -d, -l)$ and $(0, -d, l)$. The coordinates of the other strut ends (vertices) are obtained by permuting the coordinates, e.g., $(0, d, l) \rightarrow (d, l, 0) \rightarrow (l, 0, d)$ (rotational symmetry in the main diagonal of the cube).

The distance s between any two neighboring vertices (0, d, l) and (d, l, 0) is

$$s^2 = (d - l)^2 + d^2 + l^2 = 2\left(d - \frac{1}{2} \,l\right)^2 + \frac{3}{2} \,l^2$$

Imagine this figure built from struts of given length 2l and tendons (connecting neighboring vertices) of given length s, with $s > \sqrt\frac{3}{2}\,l$. The relation tells us there are two possible values for d: one realized by pushing the struts together, the other by pulling them apart. In the particular case $s = \sqrt\frac{3}{2}\,l$ the two extremes coincide, and $d = \frac{1}{2}\,l$, therefore the figure is the stable tensegrity icosahedron. This choice of parameters gives the vertices the positions of Jessen's icosahedron; they are different from the regular icosahedron, for which the ratio of $d$ and $l$ would be the golden ratio, rather than 2. However both sets of coordinates lie along a continuous family of positions ranging from the cuboctahedron to the octahedron (as limit cases), which are linked by a helical contractive/expansive transformation. This kinematics of the cuboctahedron is the geometry of motion of the tensegrity icosahedron. It was first described by H. S. M. Coxeter and later called the "jitterbug transformation" by Buckminster Fuller.

Since the tensegrity icosahedron represents an extremal point of the above relation, it has infinitesimal mobility: a small change in the length s of the tendon (e.g. by stretching the tendons) results in a much larger change of the distance 2d of the struts.

== Patents ==
- U.S. patent 3,063,521, "Tensile-Integrity Structures," 13 November 1962, Buckminster Fuller.
- French Patent No. 1,377,290, "Construction de Reseaux Autotendants", 28 September 1964, David Georges Emmerich.
- French Patent No. 1,377,291, "Structures Linéaires Autotendants", 28 September 1964, David Georges Emmerich.
- U.S. patent 3,139,957, "Suspension Building" (also called aspension), 7 July 1964, Buckminster Fuller.
- U.S. patent 3,169,611, "Continuous Tension, Discontinuous Compression Structure," 16 February 1965, Kenneth Snelson.
- U.S. patent 3,866,366, "Non-symmetrical Tension-Integrity Structures," 18 February 1975, Buckminster Fuller.

== Basic tensegrity structures ==
The simplest tensegrity structure, a 3-prism

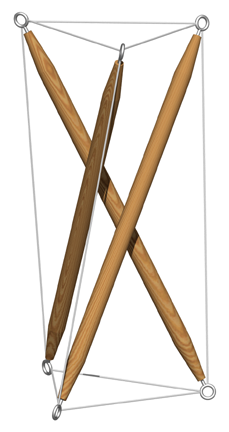
Another 3-prism

A similar structure but with four compression members

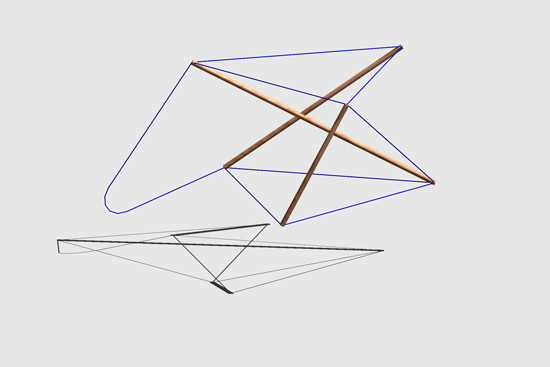
Proto-Tensegrity Prism by Karl Ioganson, 1921 (Note: Gómez-Jáuregui 2010, p. 28. Fig. 2.1)

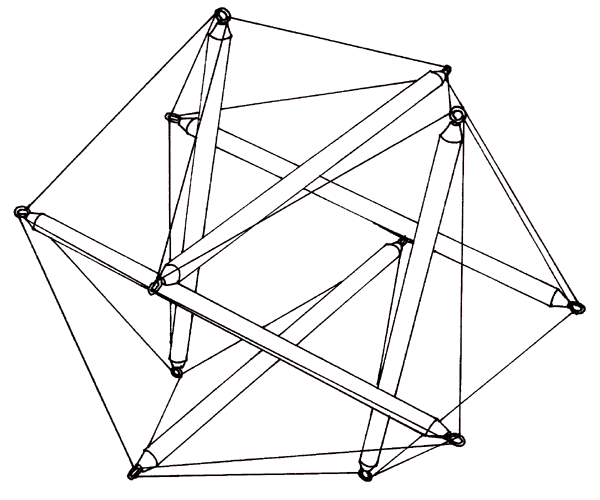
Tensegrity Icosahedron, Buckminster Fuller, 1949 (Note: Fuller & Marks 1960, Fig. 270)

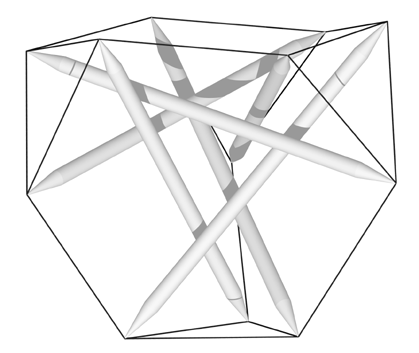
Tensegrity Tetrahedron, Francesco della Salla, 1952 (Note: Fuller & Marks 1960, Fig. 268.)

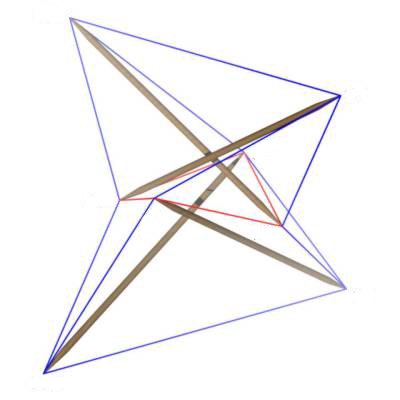
Tensegrity X-Module Tetrahedron, Kenneth Snelson, 1959

== Tensegrity structures ==
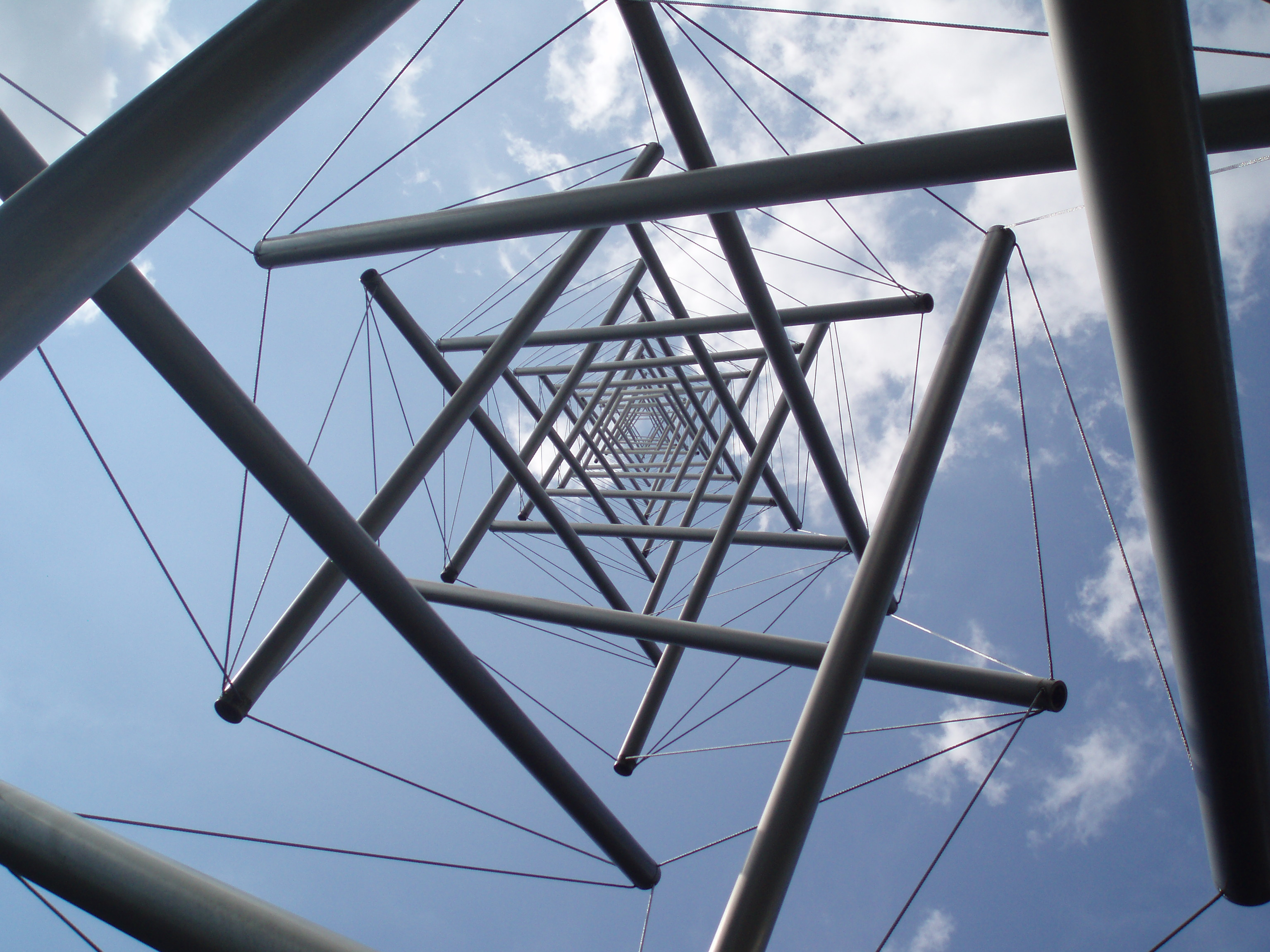
Kenneth Snelson's Needle Tower art sculpture.

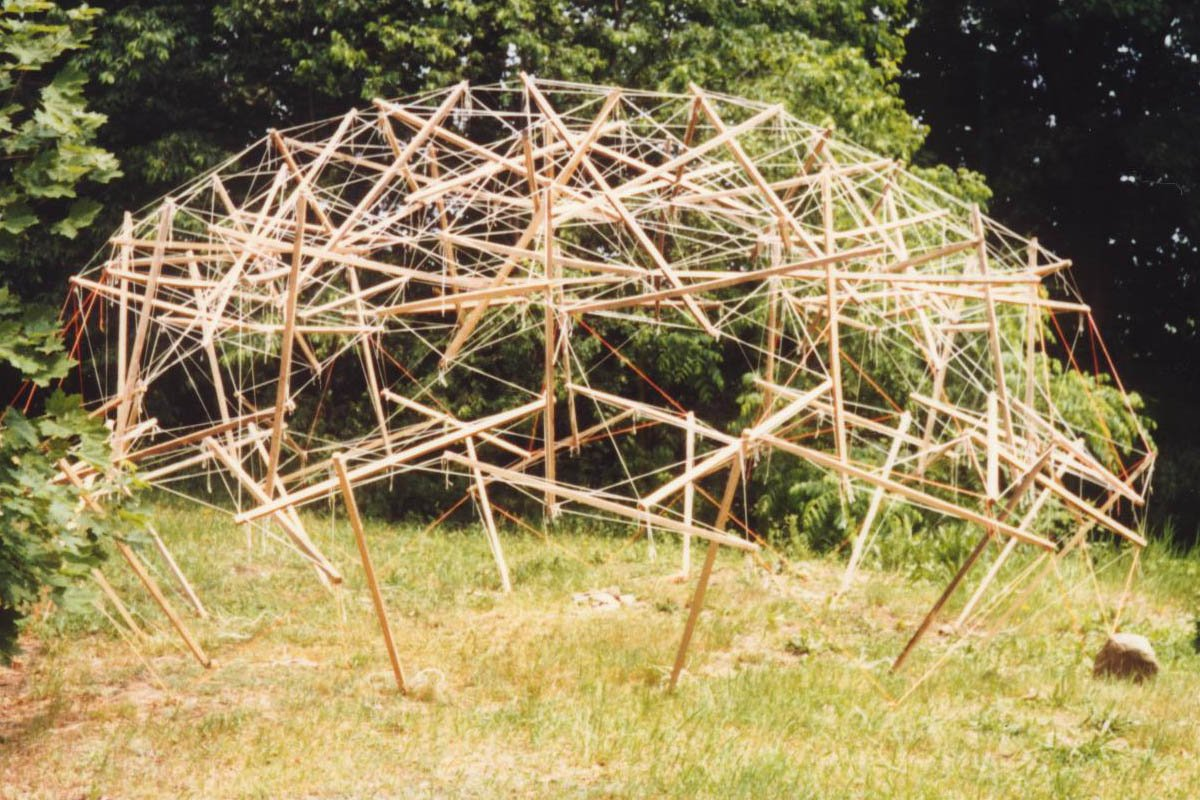
A tensegrity dome made of garden stakes and nylon twine built in the yard of a house, 2009

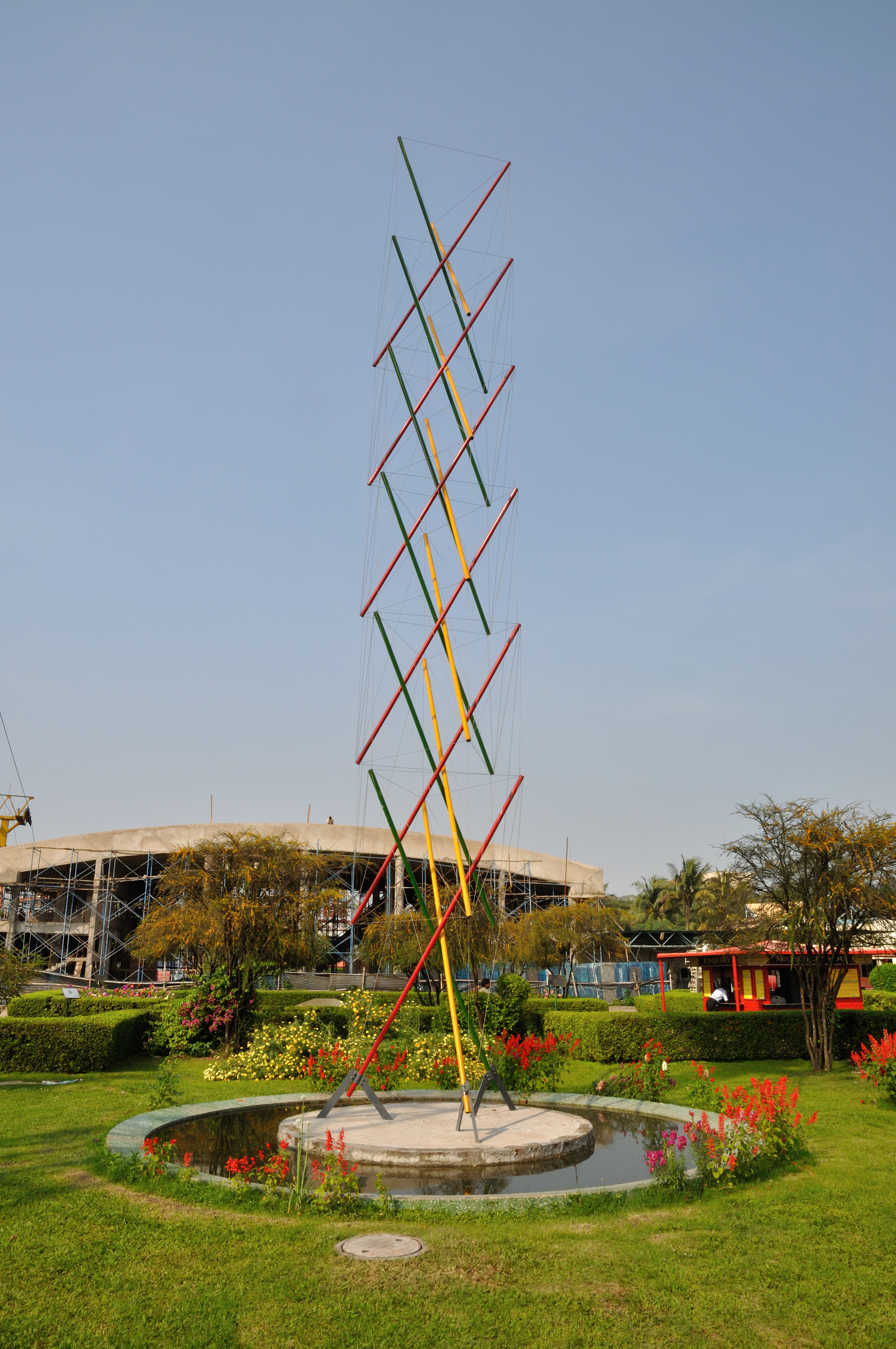
A 12m high tensegrity structure exhibit at the Science City, Kolkata.

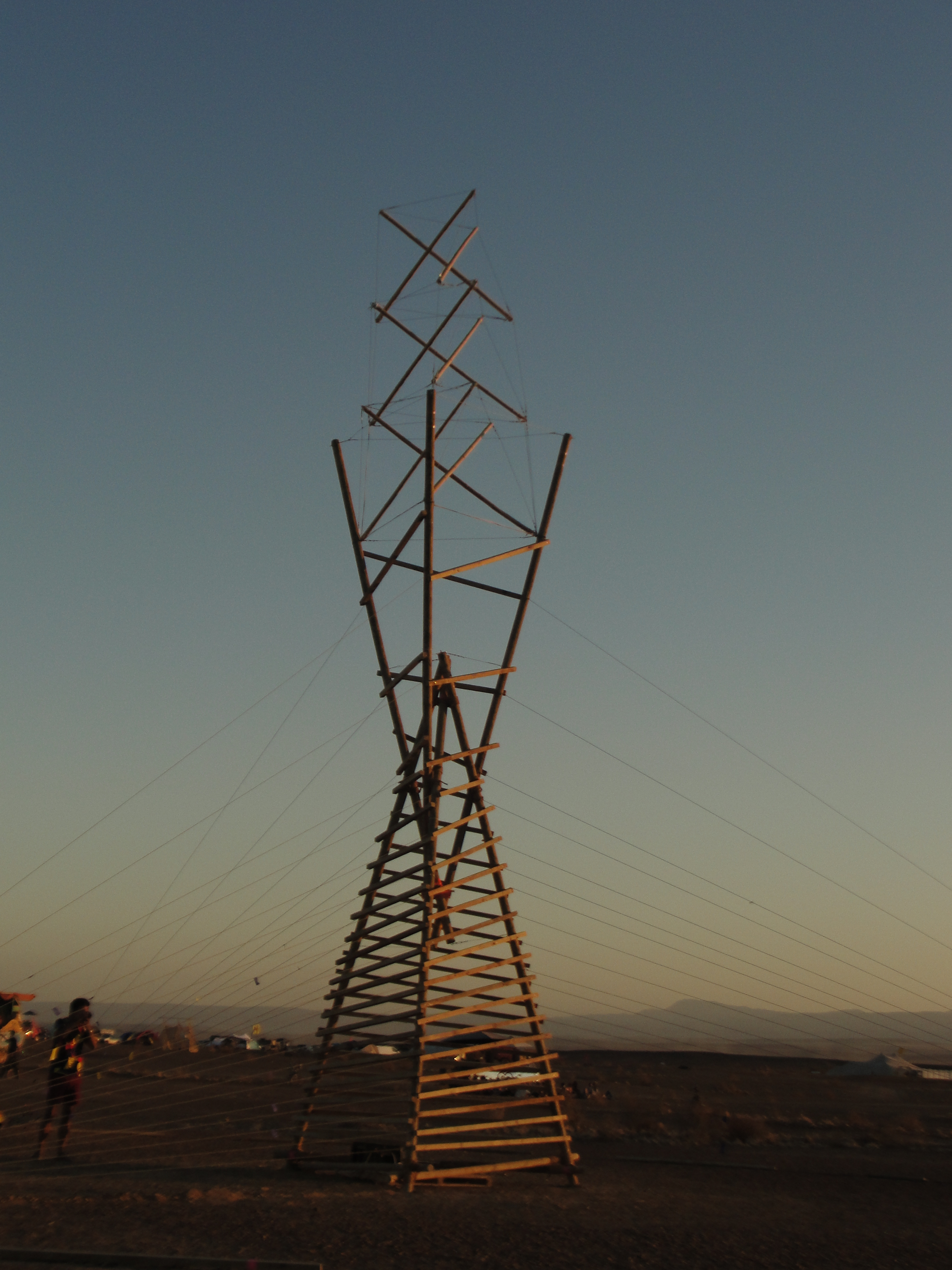
Dissipate, an hourglass tower art sculpture including tensegrity structure, constructed at AfrikaBurn, 2015, a Burning Man regional event

== See also ==
- Cloud Nine – Proposed airborne habitats, giant sky-floating tensegrity spheres named by Buckminster Fuller
- Hyperboloid structure – Type of unbounded quadratic surface-shaped building or work
- Interactions of actors theory
- Saddle roof – Type of roof structure
- Space frame – Rigid three-dimensional load-bearing truss structure
- Synergetics – Empirical study of systems in transformation
- Tensairity
- Tensile structure – Structure whose members are only in tension
- Thin-shell structure – Thin-walled structural element
- Kinematics of the cuboctahedron – Polyhedron with 8 triangles and 6 squares, the geometry of the motion of the tensegrity icosahedron

== Bibliography ==
- Fuller, R. Buckminster (1961). "Tensegrity". Portfolio and Art News Annual (4): 112–127, 144, 148.
- — (1982) [1975]. Synergetics: Explorations in the Geometry of Thinking. Vol. I. Macmillan. ISBN 978-0-02-065320-2.
- — (1983) [1979]. Synergetics 2: Further Explorations in the Geometry of Thinking. Vol. 2. Macmillan. ISBN 978-0-02-092640-5. Online
- —; Marks, Robert W. (1973) [1960]. The Dymaxion World of Buckminster Fuller. Anchor Books. Figs. 261–280. ISBN 978-0-385-01804-3. A good overview on the scope of tensegrity from Fuller's point of view, and an interesting overview of early structures with careful attributions most of the time.
- Kenner, Hugh (1976). Geodesic Math and How to Use It. University of California Press. ISBN 978-0-520-02924-8. 2003 reprint ISBN 0520239318. This is a good starting place for learning about the mathematics of tensegrity and building models.
- Gómez-Jáuregui, Valentin (2007). Tensegridad. Estructuras Tensegríticas en Ciencia y Arte (in Spanish). Santander: Universidad de Cantabria. ISBN 978-84-8102-437-1.
- — (2010). Tensegrity Structures and their Application to Architecture. Santander: Servicio de Publicaciones de la Universidad de Cantabria. ISBN 978-84-8102-575-0.
- Gough, Maria (Spring 1998). "In the Laboratory of Constructivism: Karl Ioganson's Cold Structures". October. 84: 90–117. doi:10.2307/779210. JSTOR 779210.
- Juan, S. J.; Tur, J M (July 2008). "Tensegrity frameworks: Static analysis review". Mechanism and Machine Theory. 43 (7): 859–81. Bibcode:2008MeMaT..43..859J. doi:10.1016/j.mechmachtheory.2007.06.010. hdl:2117/2717.
- Korkmaz, Sinan; Bel Hadj Ali, Nizar; Smith, Ian F.C. (June 2011). "Determining Control Strategies for Damage Tolerance of an Active Tensegrity Structure" (PDF). Engineering Structures. 33 (6): 1930–1939. Bibcode:2011EngSt..33.1930K. doi:10.1016/j.engstruct.2011.02.031. Archived from the original (PDF) on 29 September 2011.
- —; —; — (January 2012). "Configuration of Control System for Damage Tolerance of a Tensegrity Bridge". Advanced Engineering Informatics. 26 (1): 145–155. doi:10.1016/j.aei.2011.10.002.
- Lalvani, Haresh, ed. (1996). "Origins of Tensegrity: Views of Emmerich, Fuller and Snelson". International Journal of Space Structures. 11 (1–2): 27–55. doi:10.1177/026635119601-204. S2CID 114004009.
- Souza, Thales R.; Fonseca, Sérgio T.; Gonçalves, Gabriela G.; Ocarino, Juliana M.; Mancini, Marisa C. (October 2009). "Prestress revealed by passive co-tension at the ankle joint". Journal of Biomechanics. 42 (14): 2374–80. doi:10.1016/j.jbiomech.2009.06.033. PMID 19647832.
