= Tensairity =

Comparison of (a) a normal steel framework girder and (b) a tensairity girder. When the load applies from the top directing downward (trying to bend the girder), force acts on upper rods of girders as compression stress yet as tension stress on lower parts. This stress tends to decrease girder width making it less rigid. (A girder of zero width has zero flexural strength.) To prevent this upper and lower rods must be separated. Classical framework girders ensure this using triangular space frames. In the tensairity girder strong airbags pressurized with a gas is used instead. The pure tension on the lower rod load may be replaced by rope or the strong airbag membrane itself. This results in a much better strength-to-weight ratio.

Tensairity is a trademarked term for a lightweight structural concept that uses low pressure air to stabilize compression elements against buckling. It employs an ancient foundational splinting structure using inflated airbeams and attached stiffeners or cables that gains mechanical advantages for low mass. The structure modality has been particularly developed by Mauro Pedretti.

== Known applications ==
Bridges, band stand shells, geodesic domes, aircraft wing construction, temporary shop and hospitality.

== Related technology ==
A related structure modality is tensegrity. Conceivably, an ultralightweight structure evacuated of air would float in the atmosphere, much as a buoy floats in water A crushing load is present destabilizing such structures. However, enclosed-air structures perhaps made of tensairity beams in a tensegrity format holding an enveloping skin could be heated by solar energy and interior activity and then become lighter than air, like hot-air balloons. A torus of 72 inch major diameter and 27 inch minor diameter displaces about 5 pounds of atmosphere, so if the torus weighed less than 5 pounds, and was evacuated, it would be buoyant. Buckminster Fuller designed floating cities (air-filled) so lightweight that they would be buoyant only by the effect of solar heat warming the air within to slightly less density than the surrounding air. As domes, they were about 1/2 mile diameter. As floating spheres, the cities would not experience earthquakes.
