= 2016 in art =

The year 2016 in art involved various significant events.

== Events ==
- March – The Met Breuer opens in the former home of the Whitney Museum of American Art.

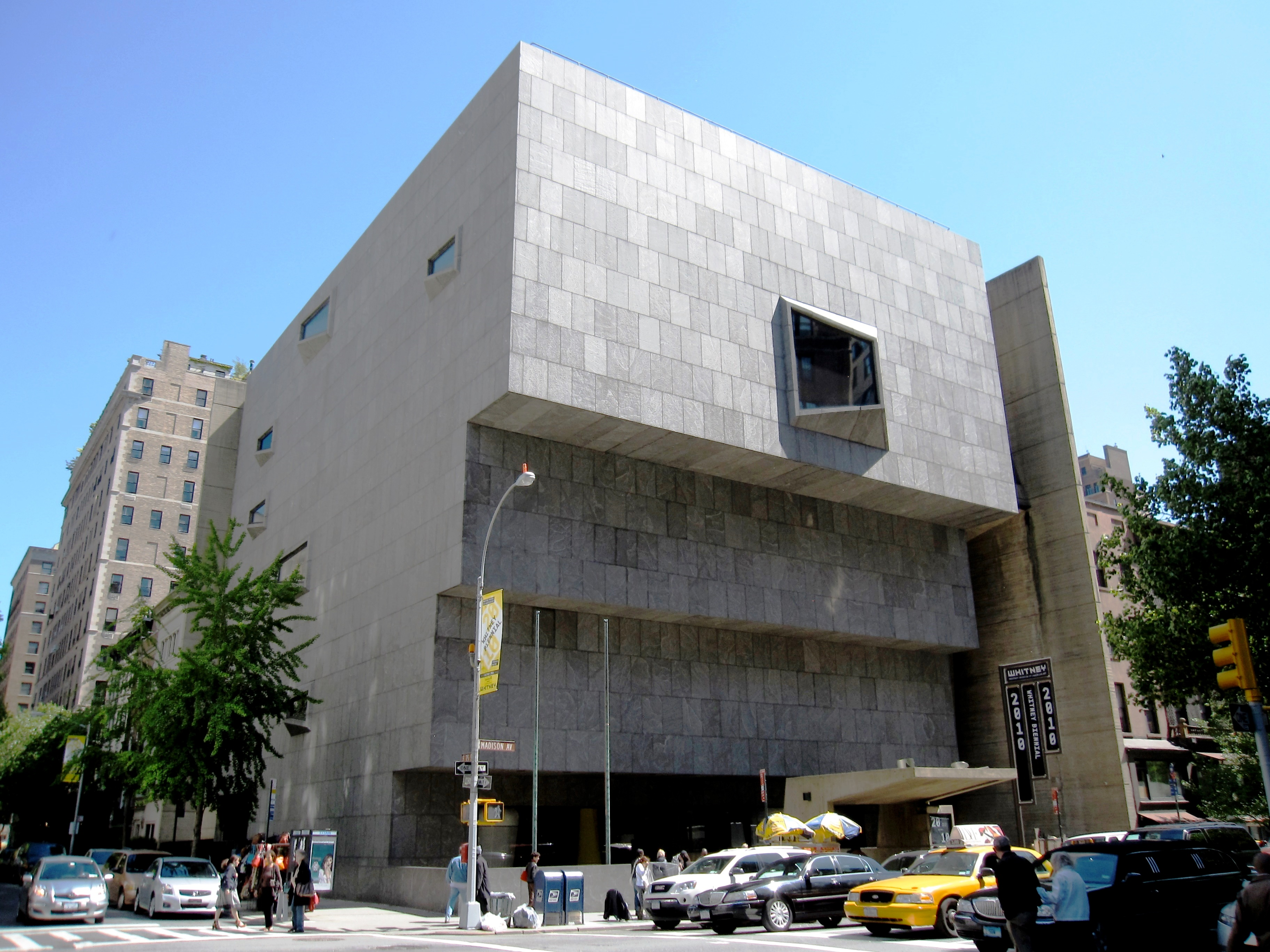
The Whitney Museum of American Art's former (1966–2014) home on Madison Avenue; the Marcel Breuer-designed building was leased by the Metropolitan Museum of Art beginning in 2016. It is now known as the Met Breuer.

- July 28 – The re-discovery of Albrecht Dürer's engraving Mary with Infant Jesus previously considered lost since World War II is reported. The engraving was noticed in good condition at a flea market in Sarrebourg and returned to Staatsgalerie Stuttgart.
- September 30 – The recovery of two paintings by Vincent van Gogh, Seascape at Scheveningen and Congregation Leaving the Reformed Church in Nuenen, stolen in 2002, is announced.
- November – The Albright-Knox Art Gallery in Buffalo, New York simultaneously breaks ground on its new $160 million expansion project (dubbed AK360) and closes until the undertaking's planned completion date of 2022. Funds raised for the new development include a $42.5 million challenge grant given by Western New York native Jeffrey Gundlach, (the largest single gift ever to a Buffalo cultutsl institution and to which he later added a further $10 million sum). When the museum reopens in 2022 it will be known as the Albright Knox Gundlach Art Museum.
- December 19 – The Russian Ambassador to Turkey; Andrei Karlov is shot dead at point-blank-range in an act of political assassination (by Mevlüt Mert Altıntaş who is believed to have been an off duty Turkish police officer) while giving a speech at an exhibition of Russian photographs at the Çankaya Contemporary Arts Center in Ankara.

== Exhibitions ==
- January 20 until April 17 – "In the Lion's Den: Daniel MacDonald, Ireland and Empire" at Ireland’s Great Hunger Museum at Quinnipiac University.
- February 5 until April 27 – Peter Fischli David Weiss: How to Work Better" at the Solomon R. Guggenheim Museum in New York City.
- February 18 until May 15 – "O'Keeffe, Stettheimer, Torr, Zorach: Women Modernists in New York" at the Norton Museum of Art in West Palm Beach, Florida.
- February 18 until June 13 – "Munch and Expressionism" at the Neue Galerie New York .
- February 27 until April 6 - Arman: 1960-1964 at Galerie Templon in Paris.
- March 2 until June 5 – "Van Dyck: The Anatomy of Portraiture" at the Frick collection in New York City.
- March 18 until August 21 – Andres Serrano: Uncensored Photographs at Royal Museums of Fine Arts of Belgium in Brussels, Belgium.
- March 18 until September 4 – "Unfinished: Thoughts Left Visible" at the Met Breuer in New York City.
- March 23 until July 10 – "Umberto Boccioni: Genio and Memoria (Genius and Memory)" at the Palazzo Reale in Milan, Italy.
- March 26 until February 1, 2017 – "Alex Da Corte: Free Roses" at Mass MOCA in North Adams, Massachusetts.
- April 27 until June 19 – "Andra Ursuta: Alps" at the New Museum in New York City.
- May 7 until November 27 – "A Third Gender: Beautiful Youths in Japanese Prints" (curated by Asato Ikeda) at the Royal Ontario Museum in Toronto, Ontario, Canada then traveled to the Japan Society in New York City from March 10 until June 11, 2017.
- May 27 until September 7 – "Moholy-Nagy: Future Present" at the Solomon R. Guggenheim Museum in New York City.
- June 10 until September 25 – "Stuart Davis: In Full Swing" at the Whitney Museum of American Art in New York City.
- June 18 until April 16, 2017 – "Tony Oursler: Imponderable" at MOMA in New York City.
- June 28 until October 2 -"Francesco Clemente: Winter Flowers and the Tree of Life" at the Complesso Museale Santa Maria della Scala in Siena, Italy.
- September 1 until October 4 – Shen Jingdong + Jon Tsoi: No Head No Heart at White Box Gallery in New York City.
- September 1 until October 23 – Bjork Digital at Somerset House in London.
- September 2 until January 8, 2017 – "Hans Memling: Portraiture, Piety, and a Reunited Altarpiece at the Morgan Library in New York City.
- September 16 until January 2, 2017 – "Carmen Herrera: Lines of Sight" at the Whitney Museum of American Art.
- September 24 until January 2, 2017 – Abstract Expressionism at the Royal Academy of Arts in London (curated by David Anfam and Edith Devaney).
- September 30 until January 29, 2017 – "Los Angeles to New York: Dwan Gallery, 1959-1971" at the National Gallery of Art in Washington, D.C.
- October 1 until March 4, 2017 - Jean Tinguely: Machine Spectacle at the Stedelijk Museum in Amsterdam.
- October 7 until January 16, 2017 – "Valentin de Boulogne: Beyond Caravaggio" at the Metropolitan Museum of Art in New York City.
- October 7 until January 11, "Agnes Martin" at the Solomon R. Guggenheim Museum in New York City.
- October 19 until February 20, 2017 – "Max Beckmann in New York" at the Metropolitan Museum of Art in New York City.
- October 25 – January 29, 2017 – "Kerry James Marshall : Mastry" at the Met Breuer in New York City.
- October 26 – January 15, 2017 – "Pipilotti Rist: Pixel Forest" at the New Museum in New York City.
- November 21 until March 16, 2017 – "Francis Picabia: Our Heads Are Round so Our Thoughts Can Change Direction" at MOMA in New York City.
- December 10 until January 29, 2017 - Susan Swartz: Personal Path at the Ludwig Museum in Koblenz, Germany.
- December 15 until October 31, 2017 – "Dalí: Stereoscopic Images: Painting in Three Dimensions" at the Dalí Theatre and Museum in Figueras Spain.

== Works ==
- Alice Aycock – "Whirpools" at MGM National Harbor, Oxon Hill, Maryland.
- Kevin Beasley – *Who's Afraid to Listen to Red, Black and Green?" Morningside Park, New York City.
- Mindaugas Bonanu and Dominykas Čečkauskas – "Make Everything Great Again".
- Fernando Botero – La paloma de la paz permanently installed at the Casa de Nariño in Bogotá, Colombia
- Christo and Jeanne-Claude – The Floating Piers on Lake Iseo near Brescia, Italy.
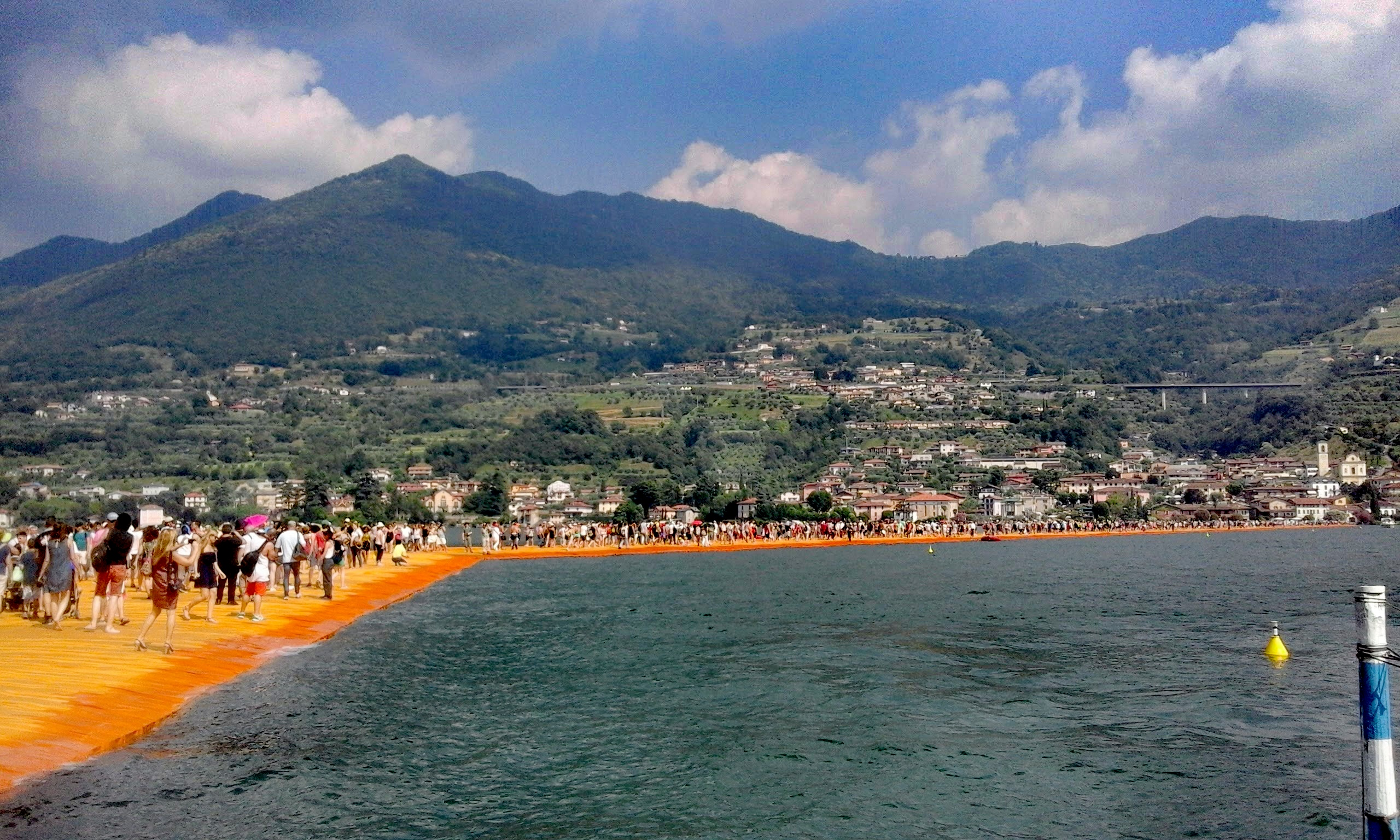
  The Floating Piers by Christo and Jeanne-Claude on Lake Iseo near Brescia, Italy
- Coldwar Steve – McFadden's Cold War (Twitter feed begins March)
- Thomas Dambo - De Seks Glemte Kæmpe (Six Forgotten Giants) in the Western Suburbs of Copenhagen, Denmark (sculptures).
- Michael Dean – United Kingdom poverty line for two adults and two children: twenty thousand four hundred and thirty six pounds sterling as published on 1st September 2016 (installation).
- Jeremy Deller – We're Here Because We're Here (event staged across U.K. July 1).
- Bob Dylan – "Portal" at MGM National Harbor Oxon Hill, Maryland.
- Eric Fischl – Late America
- Lubaina Himid – Le Rodeur (series of paintings)
- Carsten Holler – Slide addition to Anish Kapoor's Arcelormittal Orbit at Queen Elizabeth Olympic Park in London, England.
- Chul Hyun Ahn – "The Wells" at MGM National Harbor, Oxon Hill, Maryland.
- Martin Jennings -
  - Mary Seacole (sculpture, St Thomas' Hospital, London).
  - Women of Steel (sculpture, Sheffield, England).
- Christian Marclay – "Chewing Gum".
- Carolyn Palmer – Statue of Lucille Ball (sculpture, second and permanent replacement version, Celoron, New York).
- Giuseppe Penone The Germination Series at the Louvre Abu Dhabi in Abu Dhabi, UAE.
- Pikachu (anonymous sculptor, New Orleans, Louisiana).
- Martin Puryear – Big Bling (exhibited and installed in Madison Square Park in Manhattan, New York City; later installed and exhibited at Mass MoCA in North Adams, Massachusetts).
- Ugo Rondinone – Seven Magic Mountains commissioned by the Nevada Museum of Art and installed in the Nevada desert between the towns of Sloan and Jean.
- Michal Rovner – Anubis.
- Dana Schutz – Open Casket.
- Matt Starr – Amazon Boy.
- Vytautas Tomaševičius – A Still Life with Two Objects.
- Jordan Wolfson – Colored Sculpture.

== Awards ==
- The Archibald Prize – Louise Hearman for "portrait of Barry Humphries"
- The Hugo Boss Prize – Anicka Yi
- The Hepworth Prize for Sculpture: Helen Marten
- The John Moores Painting Prize – Michael Simpson for "Squint (19)"
- Turner Prize: Helen Marten

== Deaths ==
- January 2 – Marcel Barbeau, 90, Canadian painter and sculptor
- January 4 – Frank Armitage, 91, Australian-American artist for Walt Disney Studios
- January 6 – Uche Okeke, 83, Nigerian artist
- January 10
  - David Bowie, 69, British singer-songwriter, actor, visual artist, and art collector
  - Bård Breivik, 67, Norwegian sculptor
  - Cornelis Zitman, 89, Dutch born Venezuelan sculptor.
- January 13 – Lois Weisberg, 90, Cultural affairs commissioner of Chicago (1988–2011)
- January 14 – Sergio Vacchi, 90, Italian painter
- January 16 – Joannis Avramidis, 93, Georgian-born Austrian sculptor
- January 17
  - Melvin Day, 92, New Zealand artist
  - Gottfried Honegger, 98, Swiss artist and graphic designer
- January 25 – Thornton Dial, 87, American artist
- February – Jon Thompson, c. 80 English artist and teacher
- February 11 – Charles Garabedian, 92, Armenian American painter
- February 10 – Douglas Haynes, 80, Canadian painter
- February 12 – Sossen Krohg, 92, Norwegian actor and theatre director
- February 16
  - Eugenio Carmi, 95. Italian painter and sculptor
  - Bernard Kirschenbaum, 91, American artist
- February 18 – Karl Stirner, 92, German-born American sculptor
- March 3 – Tome Serafimovski, 80, Macedonian sculptor
- March 4 – Pirro Cuniberti, 92, Italian artist
- March 5
  - Robert Redbird, 76, Native American artist
  - Panayiotis Tetsis, 91, Greek painter
- March 10 – Anita Brookner, 87, British art historian and novelist
- March 11 – Rómulo Macció, 84, Argentine painter
- March 19 – Bob Adelman, 85, American photographer
- March 23 – Arie Smit, 99, Dutch-born Indonesian painter
- March 31 – Zaha Hadid, 65, Iraqi born British architect
- April 1 – André Villers, 85, French photographer
- April 2 – Rick Bartow, 69, Native American artist
- April 3 – Leopoldo Flores, 82, Mexican artist
- April 11 – Anne Gould Hauberg, 98, American arts patroness
- April 15
  - A. A. Raiba, 94, Indian painter
  - Malick Sidibé, 80, Malian photographer (death announced on this date)
- April 16 – Richard Smith, 84, British painter
- April 23 – Patrick George, English painter (b. 1923)
- April 24
  - Inge King, 100, German born Australian sculptor
  - George Alexis Weymouth, 79, American artist and conservationist
- April 28 – Charles Gatewood, 73, American photographer
- April 30 – Marisol Escobar, 85, French born American sculptor of Venezuelan descent
- May 2
  - Basil Blackshaw, 83–84, Northern Irish artist
  - Karel Pečko, 95, Slovenian artist
- May 4 – Carl Fredrik Reuterswärd, 81, Swedish artist "Non violence", (death announced on this date)
- May 8 – Louisa Chase, 65, American painter
- May 10 – François Morellet, 90, French painter, sculptor and light artist
- May 19 – Hugh Honour, 88, British art historian
- June 4 – Piero Leddi, 85, Italian painter
- June 16
  - Bill Berkson, 76, American poet and art critic
  - Giuseppe Spagnulo, 79, Italian sculptor
- June 19 – Nicolás García Uriburu, 78, Argentine artist and landscape architect
- June 21 – Kenworth Moffett, 81, American art curator (first curator of contemporary art at the Boston Museum of Fine Arts), museum director (Museum of Art Fort Lauderdale) and writer
- June 24 – Tony Feher, 60. American sculptor
- June 25
  - Bill Cunningham, 87, American photographer
  - Ben Patterson, 82, American Fluxus artist, musician
- July 6 – Shaw McCutcheon, 94, American editorial cartoonist
- July 15 – Janez Bernik, 82, Slovenian painter
- July 18
  - Billy Name, 76, American photographer
  - Mladen Stilinović, 69, Croatian artist
- July 22 -
  - Bernard Dufour, 93, French painter
  - Evin Nolan, 86, Irish painter
- July 23 – S.H. Raza, 94, Indian artist
- August 9 – Ernst Neizvestny, 91, Russian-American sculptor (Mask of Sorrow), painter, graphic artist and art philosopher
- August 31 – Nathan Lyons, 86, American photographer
- September 4 – Ralph Goings, 88, American painter
- September 13 – Gérard Rondeau, 63, French photographer
- September 18 – Hassan Sharif, 65, Emirati artist
- September 19 – Annie Pootoogook, 47, Canadian Inuk artist
- September 29 – Shirley Jaffe, 93, American painter and sculptor
- September 30 – Frederic C. Hamilton, 89, American oilman and arts philanthropist (Denver Museum of Art)
- October 1 – Daphne Odjig, 97, Canadian First Nations artist
- October 2
  - Betty Blayton Taylor, 79, American artist, arts administrator and co-founder of the Studio Museum in Harlem
  - Walter Darby Bannard, 82, American painter
  - Andrew Vicari, 84, British painter
- October 4
  - Yusuf Arakkal, 70, Indian painter
  - Elaine Lustig Cohen, 89, American graphic designer
- October 8 – Klaus Kertess, 76, American curator and gallerist
- October 12 – David Antin, 84, American poet, critic and performance artist
- October 31 – Silvio Gazzaniga, 95, Italian sculptor (FIFA World Cup Trophy)
- November 3 – Misha Brusilovsky, 85, Russian artist
- November 10 – Leonard Cohen, 82, Canadian poet, songwriter and artist
- November 14
  - Diana Balmori, 84, American landscape designer
  - Marti Friedlander, 88, New Zealand photographer
- November 16 – Myles Murphy, 89, English painter
- November 28 – William Christenberry. 80, American artist
- December 1 – Ousmane Sow, 81, Senegalese sculptor
- December 20 – El Hortelano, Spanish painter
- December 21 – Corno, 64, Canadian artist
- December 22
  - Kenneth Snelson, 89, American sculptor (Needle Tower, Six Number Two)
  - Lella Vignelli, Italian designer and co-founder of Vignelli Associates
- December 23 – Tim Pitsiulak, 49, Inuk artist
- December 29 – Judith Mason, 78, South African painter
- December 30 – Tyrus Wong, 106, Chinese born American artist and film production illustrator (Bambi)
