= Fort Sill Indian School =

Former American Indian boarding school in Oklahoma, USA

Coordinates: 34.622852°N 98.380768°W

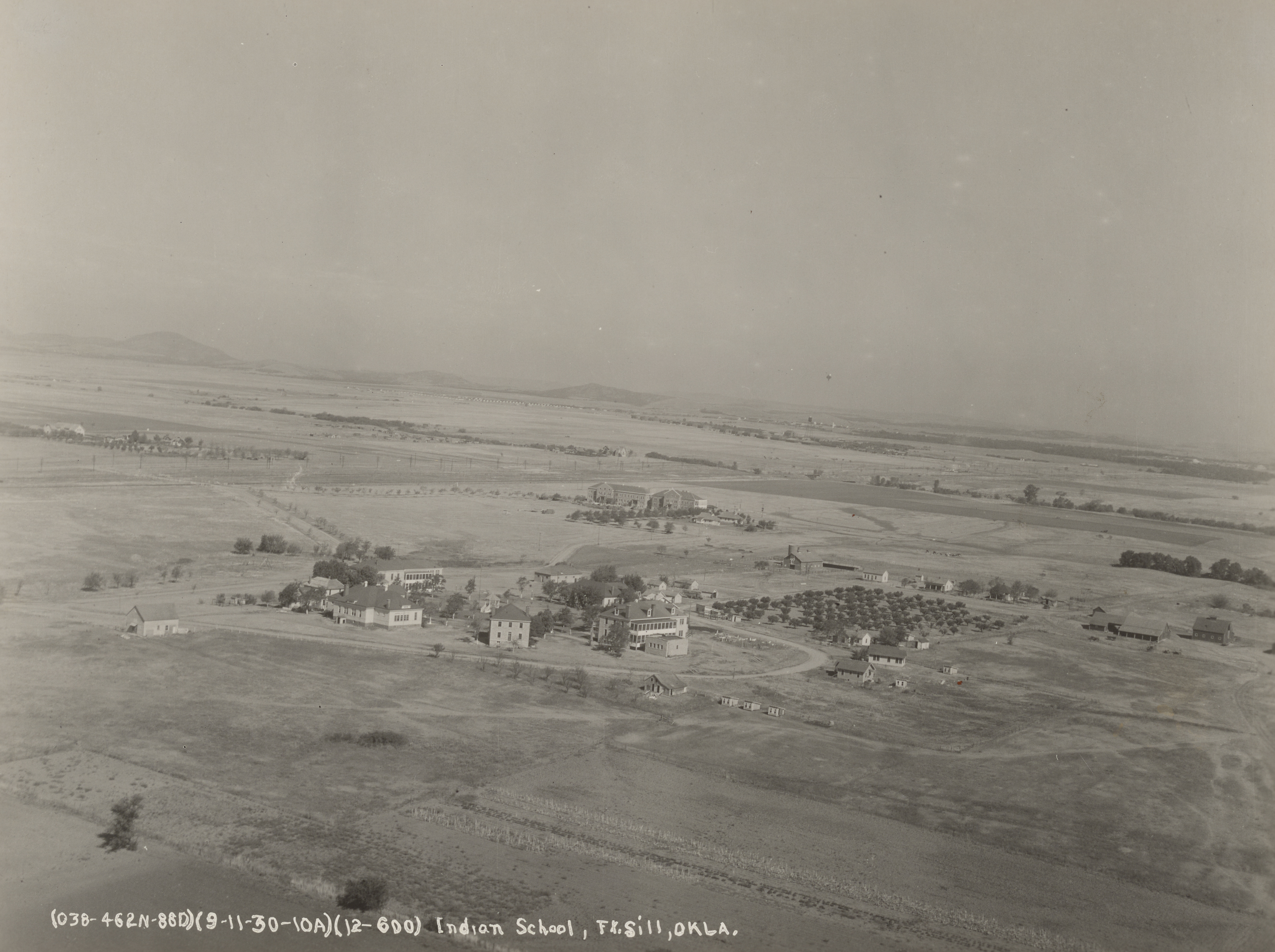
Fort Sill Indian School in 1930

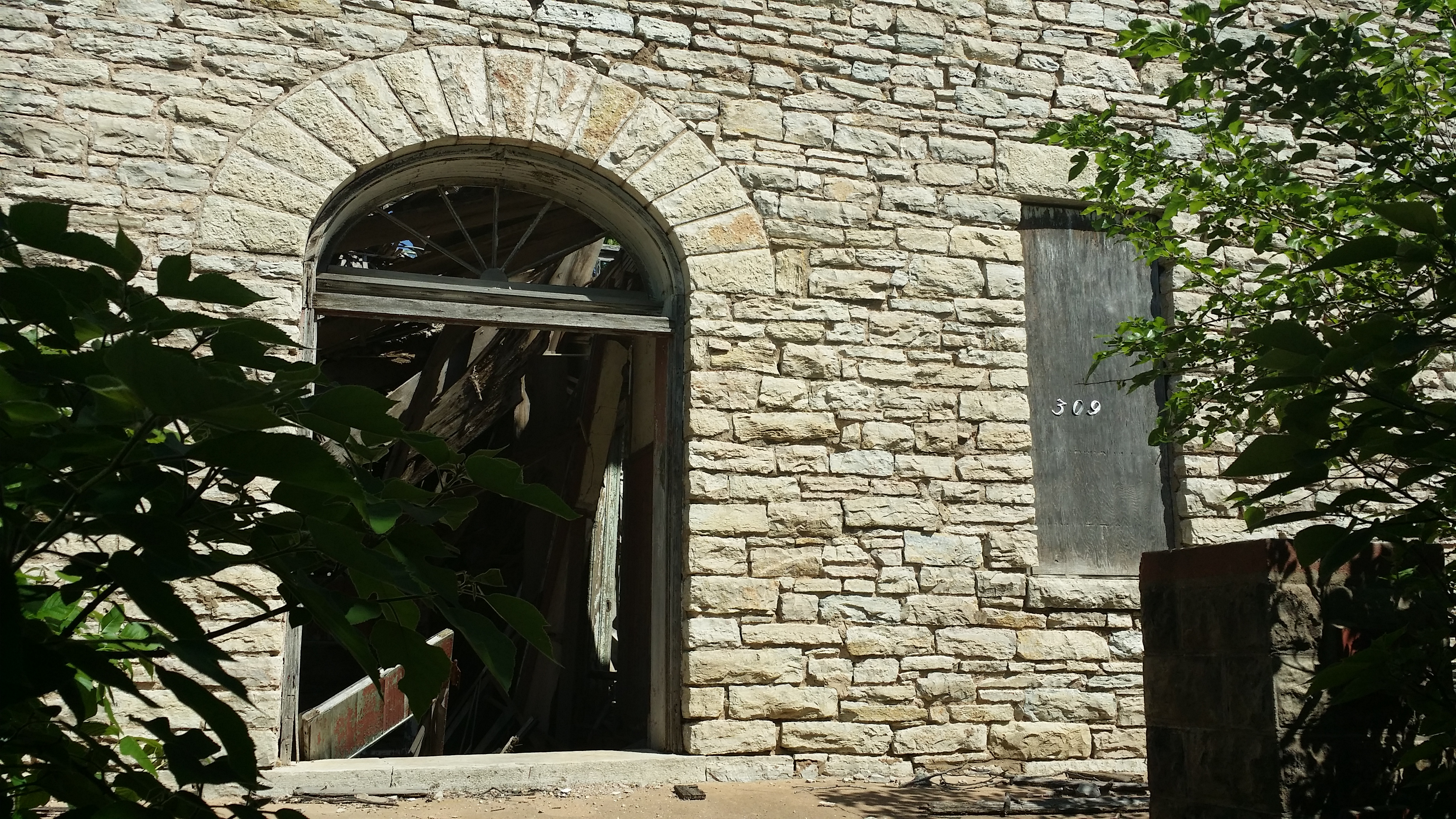
Detail of Building 309 of the school, seen in 2015

Fort Sill Indian School was an American Indian boarding school near Lawton, Comanche County, Oklahoma, United States. The school opened in 1871, with 24 students in the first year, had 300 students in the 1970s, and closed in 1980 although "Native students and administrators, alumni, and Indian leaders fought tenaciously to keep the school alive when the BIA announced its imminent closure". It was founded by Quakers but became nonsectarian in 1891.

Building 309 of the school is recorded on the National Register of Historic Places, #73001559.

The British Museum holds a collection of 91 photographs taken in the 1990s identified as "Photographs taken for a news story for the Daily Oklahoman on the planned re-opening of the school as a Native American College".

== Early history ==
=== Founding and early development ===
Fort Sill Indian School was founded by Quaker Farmer Lawrie Tatum after he became a federal agency for the Kiowa, Comanche, and Apache tribes of the Fort Sill area in 1869. He relocated the agency one mile west of its original location due to flooding issues and built the Fort Sill Agency School. The first teachers were Josiah and Elizabeth Butler of the Quaker Church of Ohio. The school became non-sectarian, however, after Josiah Butler’s exit in 1891. The school transitioned back to its original campus from 1898-1900 and then became Fort Sill Indian School with its first class being a small number of girls. Local Indigenous peoples resisted enrolling their children at first, but that did not continue for very long.

=== Native resistance and gradual enrollment ===
When the school first opened, the Comanche and Kiowa people refused to enroll their children due to conflict with the United States government. Both the Comanches and Kiowas resisted enrolling their children until 1874 when another federal agent for Indigenous people, Agent Haworth, created a school board that included local Indigenous members. The board included two men from each tribe in the agency and were changed often to ensure communication with as many tribal leaders as possible and spread the influence of men who supported the school. By 1875 twenty Kiowa children were enrolled, making up a third of the school’s entire population. This led to the school’s first problem regarding overenrollment, but it would soon prove to be a regular problem at Fort Sill Indian School.

=== Student life ===
Like many other Native American boarding schools, daily life at Fort Sill involved militaristic-style discipline including precision marching between campuses and harsh corporal punishment when rules were broken. This was most common in the earlier years of the school’s existence, even though most students at this time were of elementary age. One of the main reasons for punishment was students speaking their native language or practicing their culture in any form. Students were stripped of cultural items and markers on their bodies such as clothing or hair styles when they enrolled in the school to assimilate them into white society, as was the goal of every Native American boarding school.

There were many school programs available to students at Fort Sill, but most of them were focused on vocational skills rather than academics. For example, trade skills and homemaking classes were the most common courses in the 1940s and 50s, including sewing, child care and development, family relations, nutrition, and consumer education. There was also a six-year agriculture program that ran until 1960 when it was replaced with more academic classes. There were also athletic programs and sports teams for the students, but the lack of resources allocated for the school made them rather dangerous to participate in. It was programs like this, however, that helped students at Fort Sill foster positivity even in a hostile environment.

=== Over-enrollment ===
After the first instance of crowding in 1875, over-enrollment became a persistent problem at Fort Sill Indian School. This was partially due to the fact that the school was better equipped and more technologically advanced than other Native American boarding schools in the surrounding areas so children would be sent to Fort Sill after seeing that their local school was not as good. This, however, led to extreme crowding that worsened conditions for all students and staff such as a trachoma outbreak in 1911 that affected nearly 80 percent of the school. Government administrators tried to combat this by expanding and renovating the school, but these additions were never built fast enough and were often poorly executed.

== Building 309 history ==
=== Construction, design, and early purpose ===
In an attempt to combat crowding at the school, the construction of a stone girl's dormitory was proposed, approved, and built all within seven months in 1904. The building featured some of the school's most modern amenities such as indoor plumbing, steam heat, and electric lighting. It consisted of three floors with bathing facilities, a playroom and a boiler room in the basement, two large dorm rooms, a sitting room, and a matron’s living quarters on the first floor, two more large dorm rooms for the older girls with a matron's quarters on the second floor, and an attic for storage.

=== Additions and renovations ===
After a fire severely damaged Building 309 in January of 1907, the Bureau of Indian Affairs allocated $4,000 for reconstruction. The over-enrollment that the dormitory was meant to fix never ceased, so there were various construction projects and renovations on the campus over the next 50 years. In the 1940s or 50s a wooden sleeping porch was added to the back of Building 309 to create more sleeping space for female students. This was very uncomfortable and dangerous, as the girls had to sleep on this fully outdoors porch even in winter. A stone bath annex was also added in 1920, but it has since collapsed. The last major renovation was a two story brick addition to Building 309 which extended the basement and the first floor in 1930. The brick addition did not match the original building’s facade and looked very out of place, but due to the consistent over-enrollment the school prioritized function over appearance.

=== Decline and legacy ===
Building 309 was vacated in 1964 when the utilities were disconnected. The Bureau of Indian Affairs condemned the building and ordered it to be demolished but faced pushback from the National Parks Service’s Historic Sites and Survey office who argued the building had a significant historical background. The demolition was then halted and Building 309 was officially listed on the National Register of Historic Places on October 25th, 1973. In 1982 the Kiowa, Comanche, and Apache tribes fundraised $200,000 to restore the dormitory and turn it into an archive center for the school and restore the murals painted by students in the basement. This project was unsuccessful, however, and the building is now almost completely collapsed and overtaken by nature.

== School closure ==
=== Alumni opposition ===
Despite the many troubling aspects of the school, alumni fought to keep it open when its closure was announced in the late 1970s. The school created connections between Indigenous peoples from all across the United States and fostered intertribal communication. Alumni of the school are proud to have so many connections wherever they travel within and outside the U.S. and have never forgotten the experiences at Fort Sill that got them to this place, no matter where they ended up in life. They wanted to keep the school open in order to send their children there and give them a similar experience so they could make connections and create a network of other Indigenous people across the United States. Parents also believed the schools were the only way their children could survive and become contributing U.S. citizens.

Fort Sill was one of the oldest Native American boarding schools and to local Indigenous people it represented the government’s promise to educate Indigenous youth. Almost every treaty the United States had made with Indigenous Americans has been broken and their land stolen along with it, except for the promise of education and health care. Tribal members viewed the closing of the school not only as one of their last standing agreements being broken, but also as the end of their healthcare as well because they thought if one went then the other would be gone soon after. Local alumni and retired employees protested the closure by writing in to the newspaper. In their letters they wrote that the school’s closure represented failure of the U.S. government to uphold their agreements and that they felt cheated and deprived of services they desperately needed. They needed this school as for some families, it was the only way they could ensure their children were cared for, fed, and looked after every day.

== Notable alumni ==
- Doc Tate Nevaquaya (1932-1996), musician
- Robert Redbird (1939-2016), artist
- Charles Chibitty (1921-2005), World War II code talker
