= Charles Chibitty =

United States Army soldier and code talker (1921–2005)

Charles Joyce Chibitty
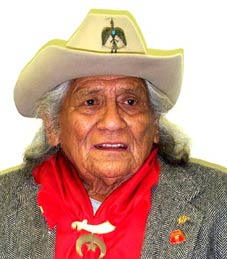
- Chibitty in 2002
- Born: November 20, 1921; Medicine Park, Oklahoma, United States
- Died: July 20, 2005 (aged 83); Tulsa, Oklahoma, United States
- Burial place: Flora Haven Memorial Gardens
- Military career
- Allegiance: United States
- Branch: United States Army
- Service years: 1941–1945
- Rank: Technician Fifth Grade
- Units: 6th Signal Company, 4th Infantry Division; 22nd Infantry Regiment, 4th Infantry Division
- Conflicts: World War II: Battle of Normandy; Battle of the Bulge; Battle of Hurtgen Forest
- Awards: Bronze Star Medal (2); Purple Heart; French National Order of Merit; French Croix de Guerre w/ palm

Charles Joyce Chibitty (November 20, 1921 – July 20, 2005) was a Native American and United States Army code talker in World War II, who helped transmit coded messages in the Comanche (Nʉmʉnʉʉ) language on the battlefield as a radio operator in the European Theater of the war.

In 2013, Native American Code Talkers of World War I and II, represented by 33 Native American tribes, received the Congressional Gold Medal from the President of the United States at the U.S. Capitol. The Comanche code talkers were credited with saving the lives of thousands of American and Allied personnel.

== Biography ==
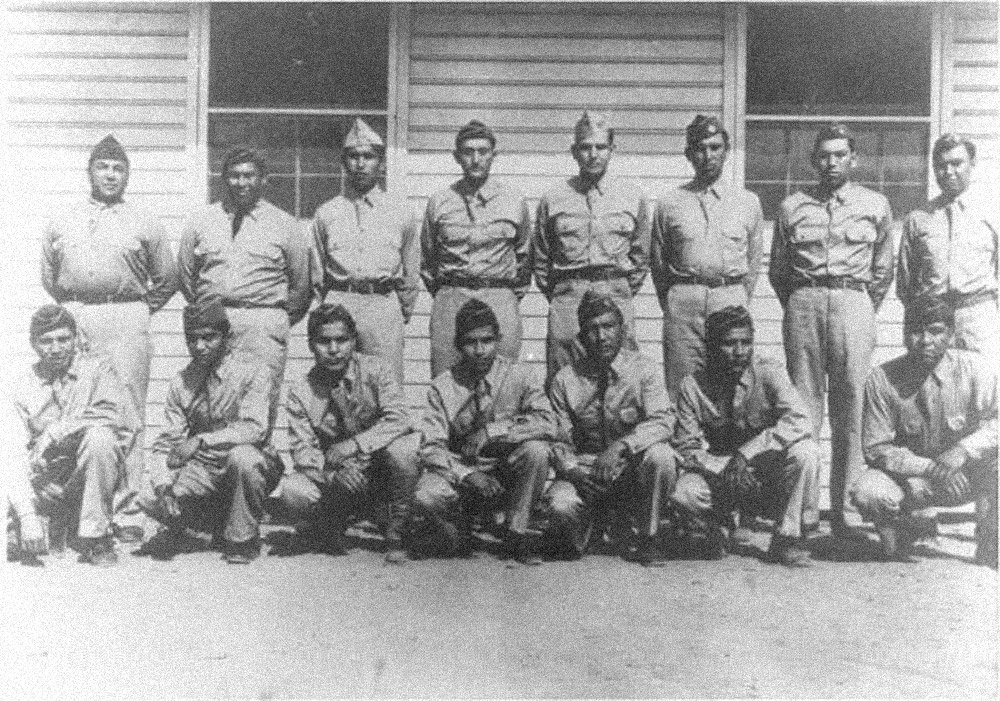
Chibitty (front row, second from right) with fellow U.S. Army code talkers

Chibitty was born in a small tent outside of Medicine Park, Oklahoma, a city located 14 miles north-west of Lawton. He attended Fort Sill Indian School as a child. While a high school student at the Haskell Indian School in Lawrence, Kansas, he constantly heard reports concerning the rise of Nazi Germany throughout Europe, and while he was home during Christmas break in 1940, his mother granted him permission to enlist in the United States Army. The U.S. Army was searching for American Indians including Comanche Indians for the Signal Corps in late 1940, and in 1941, to serve as code talkers in the European Theatre.

He entered military service on January 2, 1941, and was assigned to the 4th Infantry Division at Fort Benning, Georgia. After basic training, he was assigned to the 4th Signal Company at Fort Benning where 17 Comanche Nation code talkers were to develop a secret code to prevent German forces from deciphering U.S. military messages. In late December, he was next sent with the division to then-Camp Gordon (Fort Gordon), Georgia. Chibitty served at Camp Gordon with the other hand-picked Comanche Indians who began training at Fort Benning as army radio operators and line repairmen. In April 1943, he and 13 of the other code talkers were next sent with the 4th Infantry Division to Fort Dix, New Jersey, Camp Gordon Johnston, Florida, Fort Jackson, South Carolina, and Camp Kilmer, New Jersey, to stage for the European Theater. On January 18, 1944, the 4th Infantry Division shipped out of New York for England for more training and arrived January 26. In England, the division trained as the spearhead amphibious division for the invasion of Normandy.

Chibitty and 12 other Comanche code talkers from the 4th Signal Company were reassigned to be with the landing infantry regiments, division artillery, and division headquarters. The other code talker (Sgt. Morris Sunrise), was transferred to another division. The 13 Comanche code talkers in the 4th Division, including Cpl. (T/5) Chibitty, landed at Utah Beach in Normandy, France, on June 6, 1944 ("D-Day"). Assigned to the 22nd Infantry Regiment, the first words sent from Chibitty on the beach to his command unit in Comanche talk that day were interpreted in English as:

"Five miles to the right of the designated area and five miles inland, the fighting is fierce, and we need help."

The 14 Comanche code talkers participated in the Battle of Normandy, Battle of the Bulge, and other battles. Although none of the code talkers were killed in action, several were wounded in action, including Chibitty and his first cousin, Pfc. Larry Saupitty.

In 1989, Chibitty and Comanche code talkers Roderick Red Elk and Forrest Kassanavoid were presented with the Chevalier of the Ordre National du Mérite, and named Knights of the National Order of Merit by the French government; the 14 deceased Comanche Code Talkers were also included in the recognition-award ceremony. The role of Comanche code talkers in World War II was not recognized by the United States until 1999, in which Chibbity received the Knowlton Award from The Pentagon as the last surviving Comanche code talker.

Chibitty, who was the last living Comanche code talker, died due to diabetes complications on July 20, 2005, at a hospital in Tulsa. He is buried at Floral Haven Memorial Gardens in Broken Arrow, Oklahoma.

== Military awards ==
Chibitty's decorations and awards include the following:

Combat Infantryman Badge

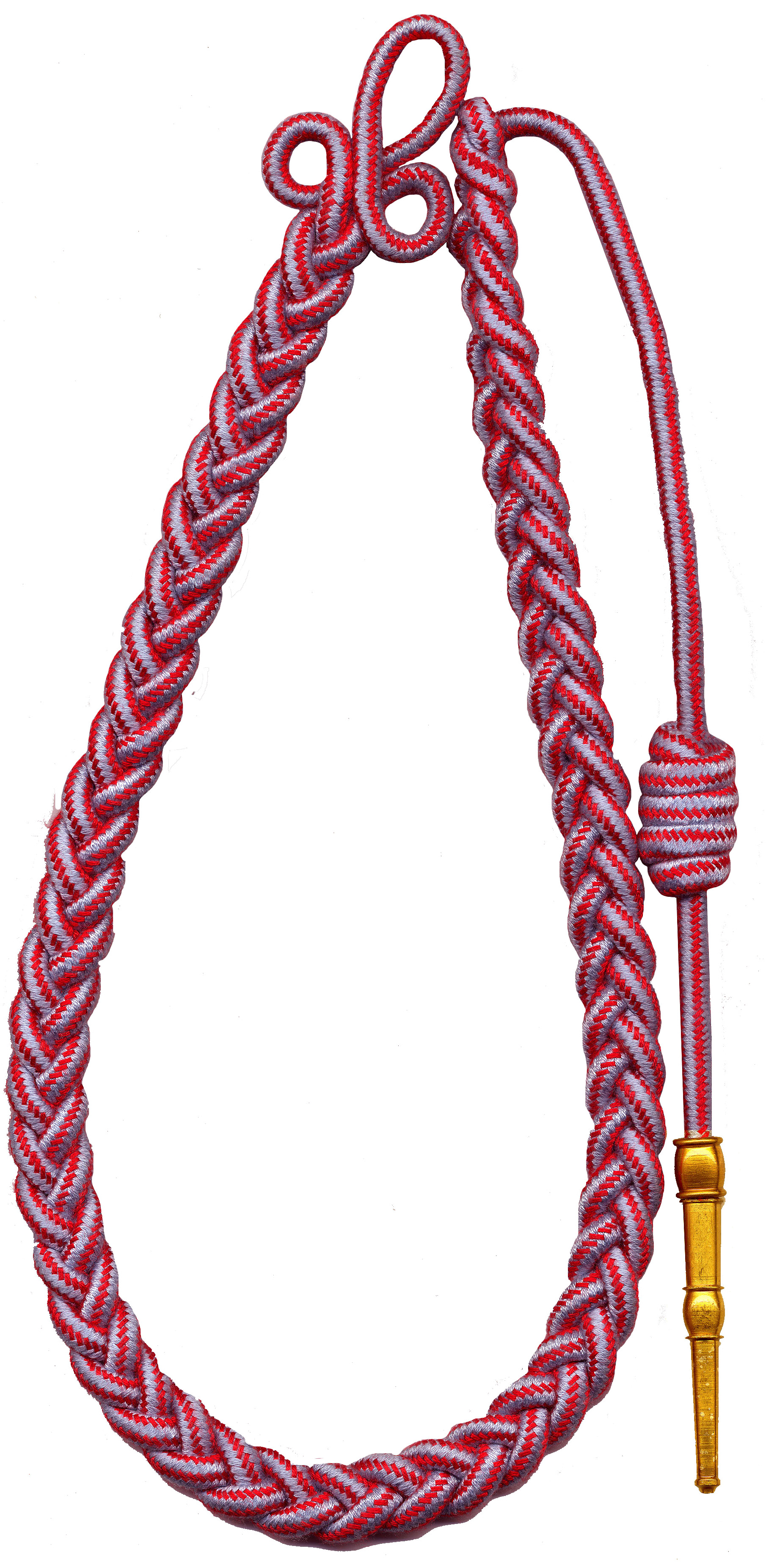
Bronze Star Medal w/ bronze oak leaf cluster
Purple Heart
Army Presidential Unit Citation w/ bronze oak leaf cluster
Army Good Conduct Medal
American Defense Service Medal
American Campaign Medal
European-African-Middle Eastern Campaign Medal w/ Arrowhead device and 3/16" silver campaign star
World War II Victory Medal
Army of Occupation Medal
French National Order of Merit
French Croix de Guerre w/ bronze palm
French Liberation Medal
Belgian Fourragère

== Other awards and honors ==
- The Thomas Knowlton Award – Established in 1995, by the Military Intelligence Corps Association in support of the Military Intelligence Corps. Chibitty was officially awarded the "Knowlton 1776" silver medal with blue neck ribbon on November 22, 1999.
- Congressional Silver Medal – Native American Code Talkers. Native American Code Talkers from 25 (33 tribes are eligible) tribes who served in World War I and II were awarded the Congressional Gold Medal on November 20, 2013, at the U.S. Capitol. Each tribe received a gold medal representing their tribe ("Comanche Nation Code Talker" medal) and each code talker of the tribe or their next of kin received a Congressional silver duplicate medal. Seven more tribes/code talkers were to receive medals at a future date.
- Oklahoma Military Hall of Fame – Charles Chibitty, 2001, and 14 "Comanche Code Talkers" who served in the European Theater during World War II including Chibitty, 2011.
- Code Talker Hall, Comanche Code Talkers mural – Fort Sill, Oklahoma, 2015

== See also ==
- Code talkers
- Native Americans in World War II
