= Robert Redbird =

Native American artist

- Born: Robert Larry Redbird Sr. July 22, 1939; Lawton, Oklahoma, U.S.
- Died: March 4, 2016 (aged 76); Lawton, Oklahoma, U.S.
- Resting place: Memory Lane Cemetery; Anadarko, Oklahoma; 35.052529°N 98.252816°W
- Education: Oklahoma State University, Okmulgee
- Known for: Native American art
- Style: Oil, acrylics, watercolor, gouache, pencil, pastel, pen & ink, & prints
- Spouse: Joquetta Redbird
- Patrons: Bob McCabe

Robert Redbird Sr. (July 22, 1939 – March 5, 2016) was a Native American artist who painted in order to preserve and communicate the Kiowa culture. He is known primarily for his blanket-wrapped Southern Plains figures and depiction of Kiowa folklore. Redbird worked in several media but is most well known for having accomplished his works with an airbrush. Oklahoma Governor Brad Henry declared June 7, 2003, as "Robert Redbird Day" to celebrate the artist's many creative and humanitarian achievements.

== Early life ==
Redbird was born in Lawton, Oklahoma, in 1939. His grandparents on his father's side raised him from birth after his parents rejected him due to his suffering from epilepsy. His grandmother was of Hispanic descent and his grandfather of Kiowa descent. He was raised at his grandparents' farm in Gotebo, Oklahoma in Kiowa County. Redbird's grandfather, Monroe Tsatoke, was a member of the Kiowa Six, an important cohort of painters who popularized Southern Plains Flatstyle painting. Inspired by Tsatoke, At Redbird started practicing his own skills at eight years old. When Redbird was 16, he sold his first piece of artwork to a doctor in Carnegie, Oklahoma, and gave the proceeds to his grandmother for groceries.

=== Education ===
Redbird was sent to Fort Sill Indian School by his parents in his teenage years. At Fort Sill, Redbird joined the Indian Art Club where he began to develop his work even more. Redbird studied art in Santa Fe until he left in the late 1960s. He also went to Okmulgee Tech where he learned skills such as welding that he used to create metal sculptures. Being an ordained minister, Redbird took the commandment, "Thou shalt not make unto thee any graven image" to heart and did not spend much time creating these sculptures.

== Notable works and style ==
Redbird's work has allowed him to travel the world. In 1967, Redbird designed the poster for the US International Open Polo Game tournament, which allowed him the opportunity to meet Charles, Prince of Wales.

Redbird's work features Kiowa culture, history, stories, and legends passed down to him by his grandfather and by William Tenedah (his wife's grandfather). Robert works in several media, including oil, acrylics, watercolor, gouache, pencil, pastel, pen & ink, and prints.

== Humanitarian efforts ==
Redbird financially supported a summer camp for handicapped children when he lived in Scottsdale, Arizona. Redbird sold his paintings for these camps that would take the children on field trips and afford them experiences that they would not have otherwise. The most money he raised for the kids totaled $56,000, with contributions coming from all over.

== Achievements and awards ==
Redbird has worked in many different capacities in his life. He has worked as a welder, mechanic, auto body repairman & painter, a Pentecostal minister, a gospel singer, commercial artist, lecturer, and painter. He also served as a cultural consultant on several motion pictures, including the 1990 film, Dances With Wolves.

Redbird has also received many awards in his lifetime, including:

- Historian Artist award at the Hollywood Indian Stars Awards in Beverly Hills
- Oklahoma declared June 7, 2003 as "Robert Redbird Day" to celebrate the artist's many creative and humanitarian achievements.
- “Honored One” - Red Earth Indian Arts Festival (2002)
