= Gérard Rondeau =

French photographer

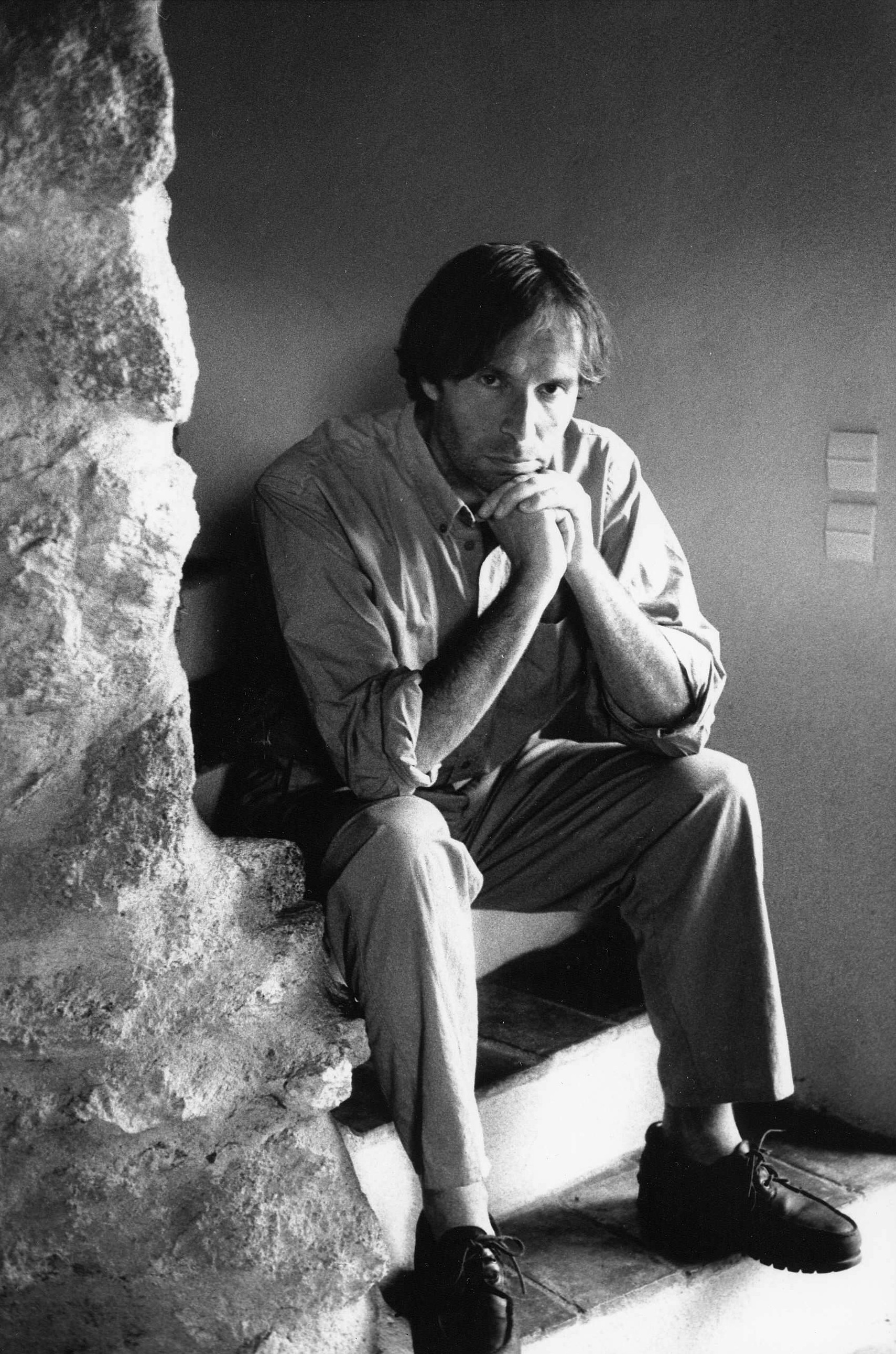
- Born: 1953; Chalons-sur-Marne, Marne, Grand Est, France
- Died: September 13, 2016 (aged 63); Créteil, France
- Occupation: Photographer

Gérard Rondeau (1953 – September 13, 2016) was a French photographer. He took photographs of World War I battlefields in his native Marne, the Reims Cathedral, and black-and-white portraits of celebrities and authors. His photography was exhibited both in France and internationally. He was the recipient of an award for his work. He was the illustrator of over 20 non-fiction books.

== Early life ==
Gérard Rondeau was born in 1953 in Chalons-sur-Marne (now known as Chalons-en-Champagne) in France. His parents were schoolteachers.

== Career ==
Rondeau worked at the Alliance Française in Colombo, Sri Lanka, in the 1970s. He was inspired by a collection photography of Henri Cartier-Bresson he found in their library. He first took photographs of the Reims Cathedral and battlefields from World War I in his native Marne. He was best known for his black and white portraits of celebrities and authors. Over the years, he took photographs of celebrities including Iggy Pop, Clint Eastwood, Peter Falk, Christian Louboutin, Serge Reggiani, Christian Lacroix, Jean Paul Gaultier, Geraldine Chaplin, Isabella Rossellini, Paul Bowles, Alain Bashung, Pierre Soulages, Jacques Derrida and Jim Jarmusch.

His photography was exhibited at the Grand Palais and the Maison européenne de la photographie in Paris. It was also exhibited at the Martin-Gropius-Bau in Berlin; Musée de l'Élysée in Lausanne, Switzerland; the National Gallery of Indonesia in Jakarta, as well as other museums in Rome, Sarajevo, and New York City.

Rondeau was the author of more than fifteen books. He travelled to Yugoslavia with Médecins du Monde during the wars of the 1990s, and later published his diary about his experience. Many of his photographs were published in Le Monde over the course of 20 years.

Rondeau was the recipient of the Best Multimedia Award from the Globes de Cristal Award in 2007.

== Personal life and death ==
Rondeau resided near Trélou-sur-Marne in Aisne, Picardy. He died of cancer on September 13, 2016, at the Henri Mondor Hospital in Créteil, Val-de-Marne. He was 63.

== Works ==
- Rondeau, Gérard (1990). Parcous romain. Paris: Barrault Éditions. ISBN 9782736001292. OCLC 24547790.
- Rondeau, Gérard; Sallenave, Danièle (1992). Capitales oubliées : Vilnius, Riga, Tallinn. Paris: Vilo. ISBN 9782719102947. OCLC 123244937.
- Dizdarevic, Zlatko; Rondeau, Gérard (1994). Le silence, et rien alentour. Arles: Actes Sud. ISBN 9782742702572. OCLC 416929209.
- Dizdarevic, Zlatko; Rondeau, Gérard; Roynette, Dominique (1996). Oslobodenje le journal qui refuse de mourir : Sarajevo 1992–1996. Paris: La Découverte. ISBN 9782707125842. OCLC 413764266.
- Rondeau, Gérard (1997). Figures du Maroc. Casablanca: EDDIF. ISBN 9789981090071. OCLC 39319405.
- Rondeau, Gerard (1997). Strasbourg. Strasbourg: La nuée bleue. ISBN 9782716501644. OCLC 40892669.
- Rondeau, Gerard (1999). C'est écrit. Strasbourg: La Nuée bleue. ISBN 9782716504812. OCLC 468833829.
- Caujolle, Christian; Rondeau, Gérard; Sérullaz, Arlette (1999). Le Maroc : hommage à Delacroix. Montpellier: Presses du Languedoc. ISBN 9782859982188. OCLC 43165574.
- Rondeau, Gerard (2000). Rebeyrolle ou le journal d'un peintre. Neuchâtel: Ides et calendes. ISBN 9782825801727. OCLC 46800845.
- Rondeau, Gerard (2003). Les fantômes du chemin des dames : le presbytère d'Yves Gibeau. Paris: Seuil. ISBN 9782020613941. OCLC 53297641.
- Artaud, Antonin; Becker-Ho, Alice; Rondeau, Gerard (2003). Antonin Artaud à Ville-Evrard : pendant la durée d'une nuit blanche. Cognac: Le Temps qu'il fait. ISBN 9782868533777. OCLC 52811584.
- Rondeau, Gerard (2005). Missions : médecins (jusqu'au bout) du monde. Paris: Seuil. ISBN 9782020796583. OCLC 492380010.
- Rondeau, Gerard (2005). Hors cadre. Paris: Réunion des musées nationaux. ISBN 9782711849826. OCLC 62130863.
- Rondeau, Gerard (2006). Chroniques d'un portraitiste : 1986–2006. Paris: Seuil. ISBN 9782020656443. OCLC 421619277.
- Rondeau, Gerard (2010). La grande rivière Marne : dérives et inventaires. Strasbourg: La Nuée bleue. ISBN 9782716507790. OCLC 721820961.
- Rondeau, Gerard (2011). La cathédrale de Reims. Paris: Grand Palais. ISBN 9782711858002. OCLC 717152770.
- Rondeau, Gerard (2011). Il se peut qu'on s'évade. Paris: Editions Thierry Magnier. ISBN 9782364740129. OCLC 759038386.
- Rondeau, Gerard (2001). République. Paris: Seuil. ISBN 9782021030181. OCLC 779688034.
- Fulgence, Helene; Rondeau, Gerard (2012). Musée du quai Branly : là où soufflent les esprits. Paris: Éditions de La Martinière. ISBN 9782732449166. OCLC 902610244.
- Bresc-Bautier, Geneviève; Rondeau, Gerard (2013). Le Louvre. Paris: Citadelles & Mazenod. ISBN 9782350314570. OCLC 863230607.
- Dagen, Philippe; Rondeau, Gerard (2015). Shadows / Au bord de l'ombre. Sainte Marguerite: Edition des Equateurs. ISBN 9782849904091. OCLC 908086905.
- Rondeau, Gerard (2015). J'avais posé le monde sur la table. Normandy: Éditions des Équateurs. ISBN 9782849904329. OCLC 932126184.
