= Pirro Cuniberti =

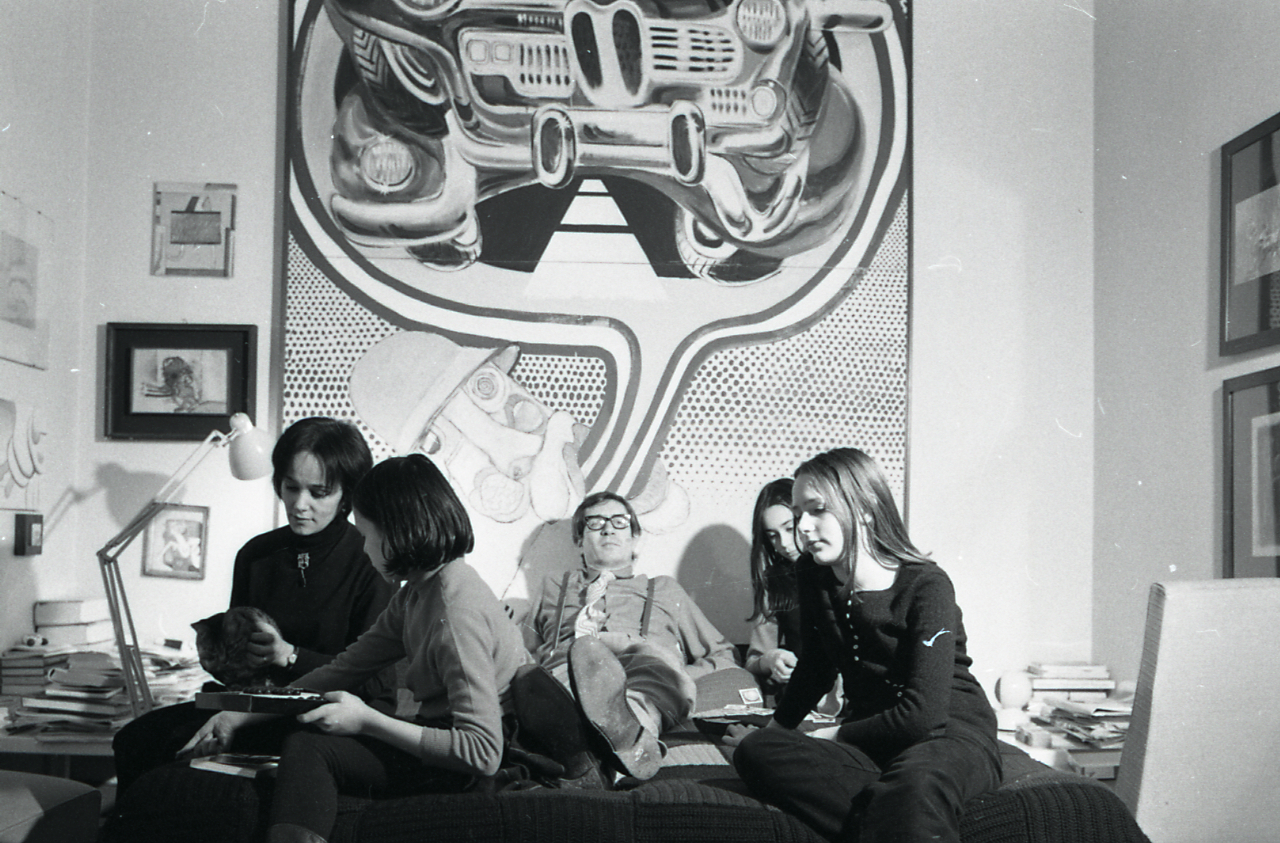
Pirro Cuniberti in his studio in Bologna, 1970

Pier Achille (Pirro) Cuniberti (September 10, 1923 – March 4, 2016) was an Italian artist. His work favored small-scale works and was divided into consecutive painterly periods that culminate with his very personal works started in 1979 on masonite panels, which are rendered in acrylic over a brushed acrylic base, initially accompanied by pastels and graphite. In 1984 he worked with Stefano Benni illustrating the book I meravigliosi animali di Stranalandia (Feltrinelli, Milan, Italy).

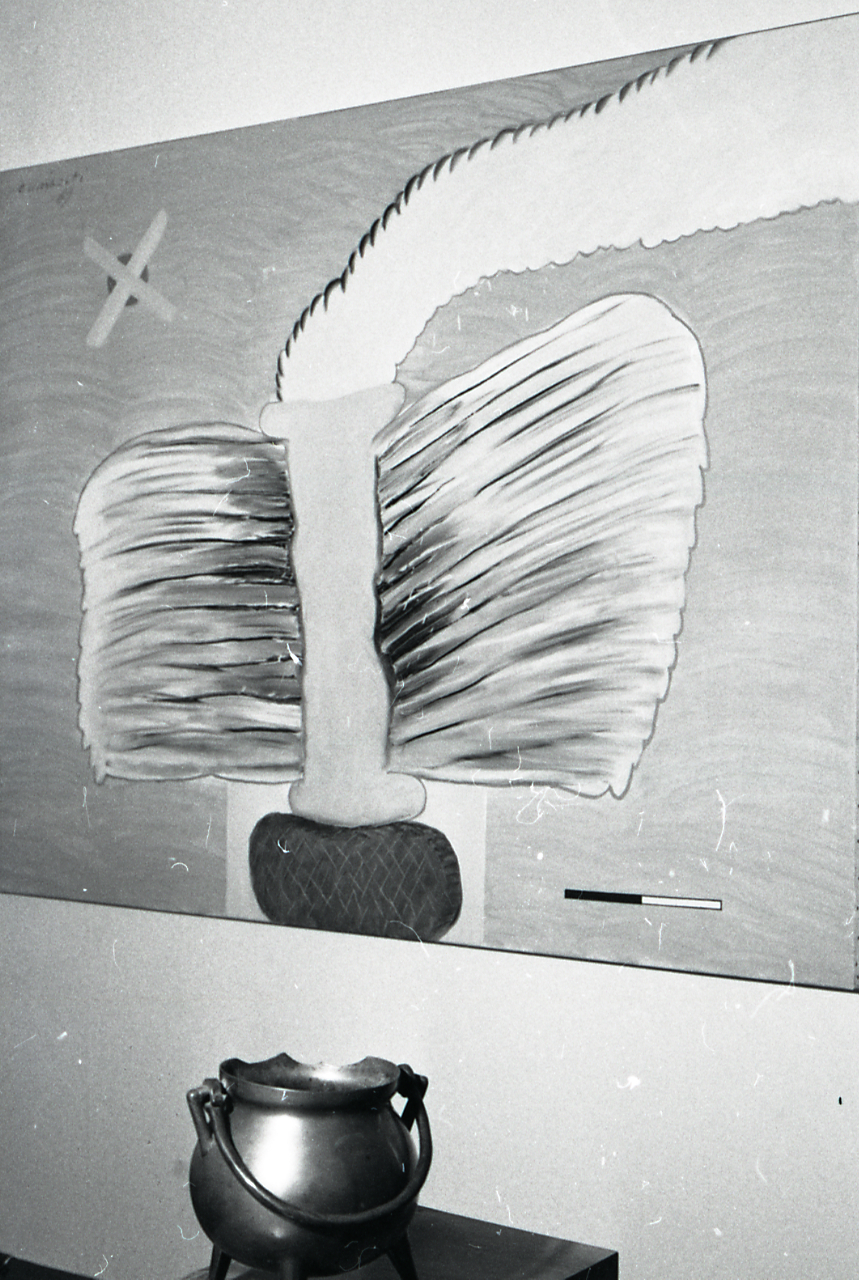
Work by Pirro Cuniberti exhibited at the De' Foscherari Gallery in 1970

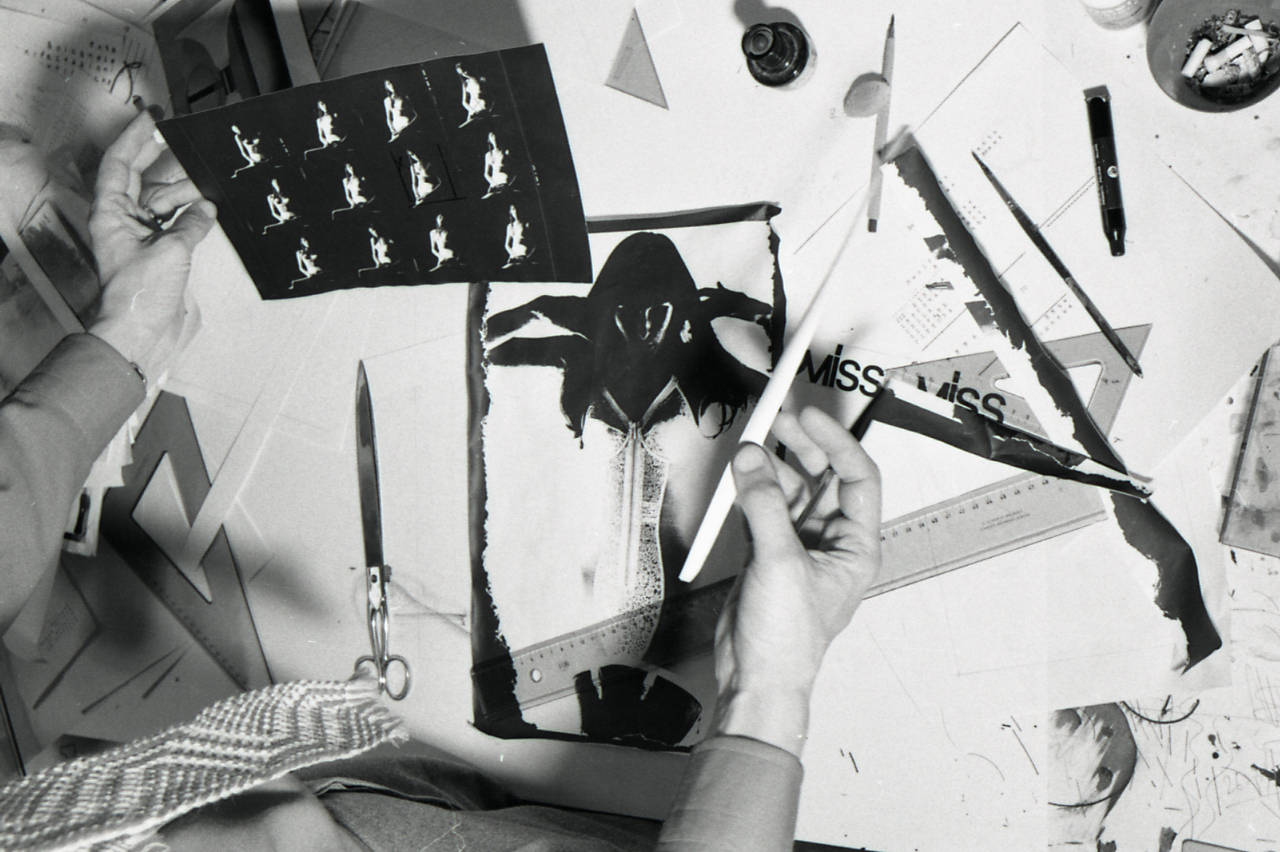
Photo by Paolo Monti in the artist's studio, Via Saragozza in Bologna.

Cuniberti was born on September 10, 1923, in Sala Bolognese, Italy. His father, Emilio (1890–1962) the youngest of five children, emigrated to the United States in 1911 and returned to Italy in 1915 to fight as a volunteer in the First World War. His Mother Zaira Monari (1902–1992) worked at embroidery, and plays the piano.

After high school, in February 1943 Pirro Cuniberti received his draft notice and is sent to the 2nd Grenadier Regiment of Sardinia; fate will also intervene in the tragic days defending Rome. On the evening of September 10, the military stronghold where Cuniberti is a telephone operator was attacked and his soldiers were killed, captured or scattered. He reached Bologna five days later. In June of the same year he was accepted at the Fine Arts Academy of Bologna. In February 1944 he was called for service again and assigned to Germany to train in the Black Forest, where he happens upon a print reproduction of "a small room with a bed, a small table and two straw chairs". he later commented:"I was struck by the simplicity of that 'sketched painting'. I often went back to look at that print which had these words written on it: Vincent van Gogh, Chambre d'Arles, 1989." At the end of the war, research into the "unknown" Van Gogh lead him to the extraordinary world of modern art.

In 1945 he was accepted in Academy of Fine Arts in Bologna. A student of Giorgio Morandi and Giovanni Romagnoli, he graduated in 1948. 1948 is also the year of the first post war Venice Biennale, where he finally saw Van Gogh's Chambre d'Arles and discovered Paul Klee, who become, from that moment on, the reference for his concept of form as infinite creative genesis and meets for the first time the works by Mark Rothko, Max Ernst and Henry Moore. He made many drawings, pastels, tempera on paper, and small oil paintings. In those years he worked to make a living with the Mingozzi advertising studio and with the publicity department of Ducati (motorbike, radio and photography). From the early 1950s he worked with Dino Gavina on graphic design and displays for trade fairs. He designed and makes chairs, lamps, objects and decorates plates in enameled iron. In 1952 he started making drawings with ballpoint pen on typing paper. Careful studies of animals and insects with exaggerated forms, achieve abstraction. In March 1953 he became a Professor in the Drawing department of the Bologna Art School, subsequently he directed the ceramic department. He left teaching in 1978 embittered by the state of chaos prevailing in Italian schools. He married Laura Baisi, Lalla, in 1955 and in December 1956, presented by Francesco Arcangeli, he inaugurated his first solo exhibition at Circolo di Cultura in Bologna. From then on his work has been shown all over Italy, with a few appearances outside. Like Giorgio Morandi he never left Bologna. In 1972, Enzo Biagi, director of the newspaper "Il Resto del Carlino" invited him to oversee the graphic layout of their publication.
