= Tony Feher =

American sculptor (1956–2016)

- Born: March 2, 1956; Albuquerque, New Mexico, U.S.
- Died: June 24, 2016 (aged 60); New York, New York, U.S.
- Occupation: Artist

Tony Feher (March 2, 1956 – June 24, 2016) was an American sculptor. He was born in Albuquerque, New Mexico, and was raised in Corpus Christi, Texas. He received a Bachelor of Arts from the University of Texas at Austin, in 1978. He began exhibiting fine art in 1980 and had his first solo show at Wooster Gardens in 1994, which Roberta Smith reviewed favorably in a short article titled "Three Artists Who Favor Chaos," saying, "Tony Feher's chaos is actually rather well-organized and instinctively archival and devotional." Since then, notable solo exhibitions of his work have taken place at Diverseworks in Houston; Sikkema Jenkins & Co., Pace Gallery, and D’Amelio Terras in New York; ACME in Los Angeles; Anthony Meier Fine Arts in San Francisco; and The Suburban in Oak Park, Illinois.

== Work ==
Feher's sculptural installations—part hobo altar, part curio cabinet, part TSA contraband table—often belie a nuanced understanding of the emotional power of the quotidian object, while displaying, at times, a quality of manic ranging. His signature material, the brightly colored plastic beverage container, found its way into minimalist compositions as well as exuberant displays of three dimensional abstraction. His pieces offer quiet encounters, suggesting the ways an individual might invest discarded bits of flotsam—vacant consumer packaging, toys and novelties—with deep personal meaning. Feher's work was said to be refreshingly direct and permissive; he wasn't overly concerned with its representational character or intellectual ambition. Critic Wayne Koestenbaum stated that ...."He collects and arranges his colorful foundlings with custodial precision—a kinky rigor that restores the dignity of those who overly cathect to household flotsam. Feher’s patterns reassure; he seems a model-maker, constructing maquettes of villages and bundled communities that imagine utopia by seceding from usefulness into gridded whimsy." Silvia Bottinelli, writing in Sculpture Magazine, noted that Feher's ambition differs markedly from other contemporary artists (such as Haim Steinbach) who have made the commonplace object their own: "Feher’s interpretation of the readymade is not strictly Duchampian, though. His work is not about decontextualizing manufactured objects to question ideas of craftsmanship and originality in art. Before landing in a gallery or museum, the elements of his sculptures are part of his daily environment."

== Personal life and death ==
As a young child, Feher exhibited a curiosity towards tinkering with and transforming everyday objects. Feher's father was a Navy commander and the family moved frequently throughout his childhood.

After receiving his BFA in Austin, Texas, Feher worked a variety of odd jobs, including store clerk and architect's assistant. He subsequently moved to New York, where, in the 1980s, he contracted AIDS. His work was occasionally associated with the ephemeral and fleeting nature of life as an HIV-positive man. Feher died on June 24, 2016, from liver cancer complications. He was 60.

== Solo exhibitions ==
2014
Tony Feher: Super Special Happy Group, Hiram Butler Gallery, Houston, TX
Tony Feher, Utah Museum of Fine Arts, Salt Lake City, UT
Tony Feher, The Lumber Room, Portland, OR
Tony Feher, Akron Art Museum, Akron, OH
Tony Feher: Two Works, James Harris Gallery, Seattle, WA
2013
Tony Feher: Free Fall, DiverseWorks, Houston, TX
Encore, Sikkema Jenkins & Co., New York, NY
Tony Feher, DeCordova Sculpture Park and Museum, Lincoln, MA
Free Fall, Diverse Works, Houston, TX
2012
Tony Feher – A Work in Four Parts, Hiram Butler Gallery, Houston, TX
Tony Feher, Anthony Meier Fine Arts, San Francisco, CA
Tony Feher, Des Moines Art Center, Des Moines, IA
Tony Feher: Extraordinary Ordinary, Ulrich Museum of Art, Wichita State University, Wichita, KS
ArtPace, San Antonio, TX
Anthony Meier Fine Arts, San Francisco, CA
2011
Next On Line, Pace Gallery, New York, NY
2010
Arthouse at the Jones Center, Austin, TX
Lora Reynolds Gallery, Austin, TX
2009
Blossom, D’Amelio Terras, New York, NY
Wall Show, D’Amelio Terras, New York, NY
2008
Anthony Meier Fine Arts, San Francisco, CA
Re:Place, Contemporary Arts Center, New Orleans, LA
Pace Wildenstein, New York, NY
D’Amelio Terras, New York, NY
2007
Some Time Soon, Art Museum of South Texas, Corpus Christi, TX
A Single Act of Carelessness... Indianapolis Museum of Art, Indianapolis, IN
ACME, Los Angeles, CA
2006
The Suburban, Oak Park, IL
2005
Anthony Meier Fine Arts, San Francisco, CA
The Chinati Foundation, Marfa, TX
2004
The Wart on the Bosom of Mother Nature, D’Amelio Terras, New York, NY
Transport to Summer, Foundación La Caixa, Lleida, Spain
