= Sergio Vacchi =

Italian painter (1925–2016)

- Born: 1 April 1925; Castenaso, Italy
- Died: 16 January 2016 (aged 90); Siena, Italy
- Occupation: Painter

Sergio Vacchi (1 April 1925 – 14 January 2016) was an Italian painter.

== Biography ==
Born in Castenaso, Bologna, Vacchi abandoned his studies in law to pursue his passion for painting. A self-taught artist, in 1951 he held his first solo exhibition in Milan at the prestigious Galleria del Milione. After a period close to post-cubism, between 1956 and 1962 he embraced informalism.

In the early 1960s, Vacchi moved to Rome, where he started a cycle of gouaches and paintings collectively known as Il Concilio (i.e. "The Council"), which raised large controversities with the Roman Catholic Church because of their grotesque and sometimes blasphemous representation of the church. When in 1964 Vacchi was invited to the Venice Biennale, the patriarch of Venice forbade Catholics to visit his room. Following some cues present in Il Concilio, Vacchi embraced a new art movement, known as Nuova Figurazione ("New Figuration"), of which the first significant example was Morte di Federico II di Hohenstaufen. In the following years the painting cycles Galileo Galilei semper... and Pianeta followed.

In the 1990s Vacchi devoted himself to cycles of portraits and self-portraits, and particularly to Greta Garbo's portraits. In 1997 he moved to Siena, where he founded the foundation Fondazione Vacchi. He stopped painting in the late 2000s, because of the Parkinson's disease that had affected him.
