= Piero Leddi =

Italian painter (1930–2016)

- Born: 30 August 1930; San Sebastiano Curone, Italy
- Died: 4 June 2016 (aged 85); Milan, Italy
- Occupation: Painter

Piero Leddi (30 August 1930 – 4 June 2016) was an Italian painter.

Born in San Sebastiano Curone, Alessandria, after moving to Tortona, Leddi became interested in painting, influenced by the works of Giuseppe Pellizza da Volpedo. In 1951 he moved to Milan, where he started working as a graphic designer. He held his first solo exhibitions in 1953 and in 1958.

Leddi's art mainly focused on the theme of the modern city, consisting of industrial landscapes, urban living interiors, cars and intellectual discussions. Another favorite, parallel theme was the decline of the archaic rural world, often symbolized by Fausto Coppi, the son of two farmers, whose story and tragic end was seen as a symbol of a peasant epic. His art was characterized by delicate colors, and he frequently used pastel colors, often mixed watercolor and tempera. In his works there was often a jumble of elements, which led to expressionistic results. Starting from the 1960s, he began to include in the compositions geometric themes of post-Cubist mold.

Leddi died on 4 June 2016 in the Niguarda hospital in Milan because of the complications subsequent to the breakage of a femur. He was 85.
