= Yusuf Arakkal =

Indian painter (1945–2016)

- Born: Yusuf Arakkal; 1945; Chavakkad, Thrissur, Kerala
- Died: 4 October 2016 (aged 70–71); Bangalore, Karnataka
- Occupation: Artist
- Spouse: Sara Arakkal
- Children: Shibu Arakkal

Yusuf Arakkal (1945 – 2016) was an Indian artist.

== Life ==
Arakkal was born in Chavakkad, Kerala. Both his parents died when he was young. Leaving the comforts of his house behind, he left for Bangalore, lonely but with a passion to become a painter. The hardships that he faced at Bangalore honed the artist in him and sharpened his sensibility. He took a diploma in painting from Karnataka Chitrakala Parishat (KCP), Bangalore and later specialized in graphic print making from National Academy community studios, Garhi, Delhi.

Arakkal received the prestigious Lorenzo De Medici Gold Medal, at Florence Internazionale Biennale, in Florence, Italy for his work Bacon’s Man with the Child and Priest. The artist produced a large collection of miscellaneous works consisting of drawings, paintings, sculptures, murals, paper works, prints and writing.

He won several other awards including Karnataka Lalithkala Academy award in 1979 and 1981, a national award in 1983, a special award at the third Asian Art Biennale Dhaka, Bangladesh in 1986 and the Karnataka Lalithkala Academy honor in 1989.

Arakkal's paintings expresses the concern for man and society. The style of the painting involves a dark, oppressive background with faceless figures of ordinary people in it, expressing loneliness and despair brought on by a society which are drawn towards material success where ordinary people have no place.

== Death ==
On 4 October 2016, Arakkal died in Bangalore due to a heart attack, at the age of 71.

== Exhibitions ==
In his career he exhibited extensively Internationally and in India. He has done many international shows.

== Solo international shows ==
- 1992 - Relays De Monts - Siux, Limousin, France.
- 1993 - Gallerie Taormina Del Arte - Le Havre, France.
- 1994 - Srijana Contemporary Art Gallery - Kathmandu, Nepal.
- 1994 - Art Forum Gallery, Singapore.
- 1996 - Wallace Gallery, Chelsea, New York.
- 1996 - Air Gallery, Dower Street, London.

== Group International shows ==
- 1971 - Indian Artists at Belarus and Moscow.
- 1985 - Thirty contemporary Indian Artists at Habana, Cuba.
- 1985 - Contemporary Indian Art show at the National Museum Mexico City, Mexico.
- 1985 - Second Asian Art show, Fukuoka, Japan.
- 1985 - Indian Printmaking, Festival of India, USA.
- 1986 - Sixth biennale de beau Art, Beaumont, France.
- 1986 - Third Asian Art Biennale, Dhaka, Bangladesh.
- 1986 - Inaugural exhibition of the National Museum of Modern Art, Seoul, South Korea.
- 1986 - Sixth International Triennale, New Delhi, India.
- 1987 - Ninth International Biennale de São Paulo, Brazil.
- 1993 - Nine Indian Artists CCA Gallery, New York.
- 1994 - Indian printmaking show, Maltwood Art Museum & Gallery Victoria, British Columbia.
- 1994 - Indian Contemporary Art Show, Gallery Maya, Hong Kong
- 1995 - Heads and faces - an exhibition by Gallery Maya, Visual Art Centre, Hong Kong.
- 1995 - 'Save the children' auction by Sothebys, Bombay.
- 1996 - Indian Contemporary Art show, Nagai Garo, Tokyo, Japan
- 1996 - 32 Contemporary Indian artists - exhibition and auction by Christies, London.
- 1996 - Women in Indian Art, by The Gallery, Visual Art Centre, Hong Kong.
- 1997 - Auction of Indian Contemporary Art by Christies, London.
