= Needle Tower =

Artwork by Kenneth Snelson, version at Hirshhorn Sculpture Garden

- Artist: Kenneth Snelson
- Year: 1968
- Type: Aluminum & Stainless steel
- Dimensions: 18 m (60 ft × unknown ft × unknown ft)
- Location: Hirshhorn Museum and Sculpture Garden; Washington, D.C., United States; 38°53′16.4″N 77°1′20.99″W
- Owner: Smithsonian Institution

Needle Tower is a public artwork created by American sculptor Kenneth Snelson in 1968. It is located on the grounds of the Hirshhorn Museum and Sculpture Garden in Washington, D.C., USA.

== Description ==
This 26.5-meter-tall abstract sculpture is a tapering tower made of aluminum and stainless steel. The aluminum tubes act in compression, held in tension by the stainless steel cables threaded through the ends of the tubes.

According to Valerie Fletcher from the Institute for Human Centered Design, the “Needle Tower brings together advanced engineering methods with a very sophisticated aesthetic of abstraction".

== Acquisition ==
The piece was a gift of Joseph Hirshhorn in 1974.

== Tensegrity ==
Snelson's unique sculpture style is well articulated in Needle Tower.

The structure style displayed is known as "tensegrity," a description given by Snelson's former professor Buckminster Fuller to the melding of tension and structural integrity. According to Snelson:

Tensegrity describes a closed structural system composed of a set of three or more elongate compression struts within a network of tension tendons, the combined parts mutually supportive in such a way that the struts do not touch one another, but press outwardly against nodal points in the tension network to form a firm, triangulated, prestressed, tension and compression unit.

== Symbolism ==
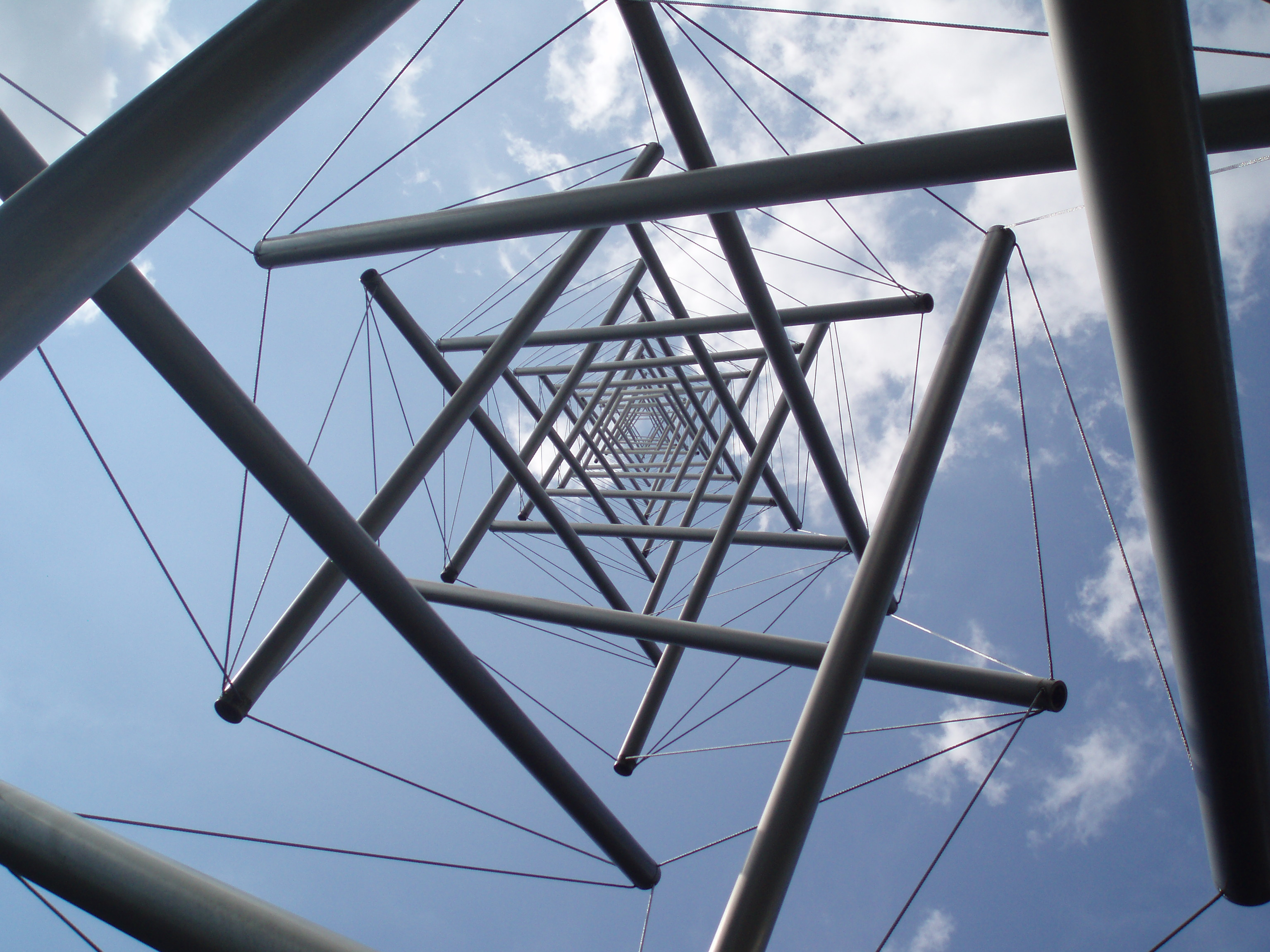
The six-pointed star visible from under Needle Tower II

Much has been said about the geometric shapes seen in Snelson's works. Looking up from the inside of Needle Tower one may see the Star of David. According to Snelson, his works are not symbolic and it's common to see six-pointed stars in his work. In Needle Tower the six pointedness comes from the natural geometry of the three compression struts that make up each layer. Sets of three alternate with left and right helical modules, adding up to six when viewed upwards from the base of the tower.

== Conservation ==
Over time, small wires started to fray and snap. In April 2010 conservation work was completed on the sculpture by the Hirshhorn Museum. It took 15 staff members to stand the tower upright after conservation completion. The top portion was replaced, with Snelson handling the renovation.

== Needle Tower II ==
A second Needle Tower, Needle Tower II, was completed in 1968 and was acquired by the Kröller-Müller Museum in 1971. The piece resides in the museum's sculpture garden.

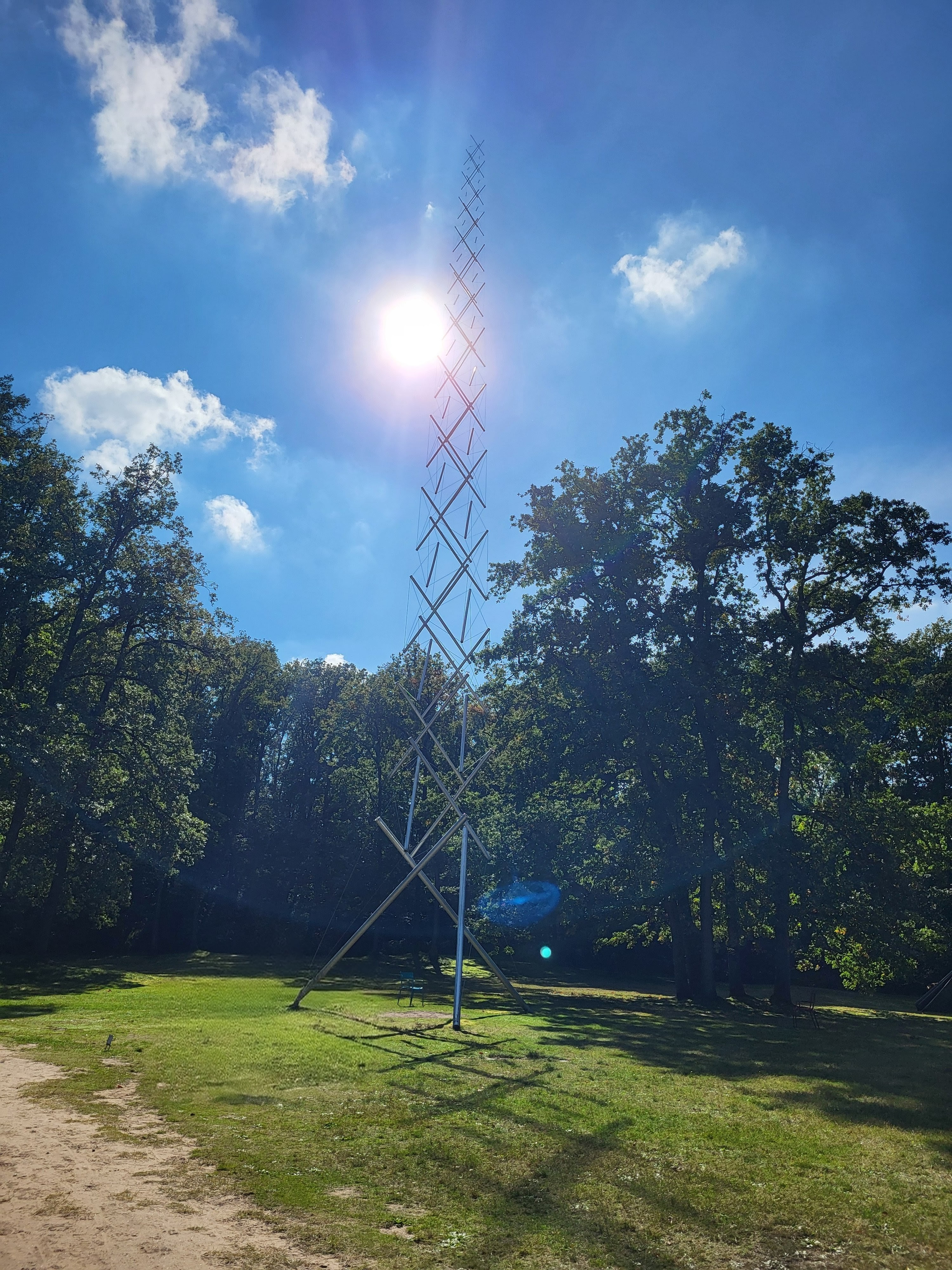
Needle Tower from Kröller-Müller

== Gallery ==
Detail

Label

== See also ==
- List of public art in Washington, D.C., Ward 2
