= Kenneth Snelson =

American contemporary sculptor and photographer (1927 - 2016)

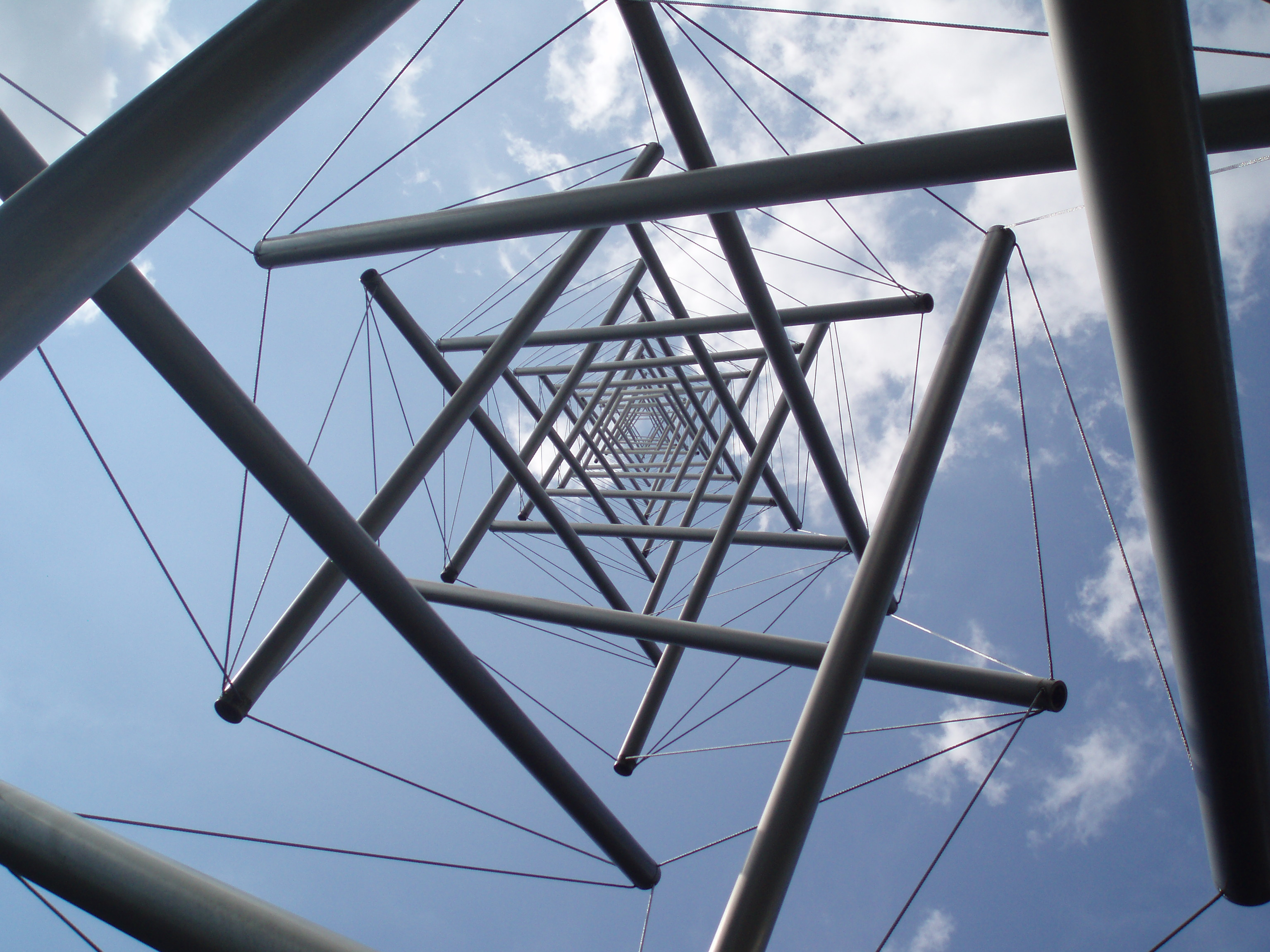
- Needle Tower II by Kenneth Snelson (1969) at the Kröller-Müller Museum in Netherlands
- Born: June 29, 1927; Pendleton, Oregon
- Died: December 22, 2016 (aged 89); New York City, New York
- Education: University of Oregon; Black Mountain College; Fernand Léger in Paris.
- Known for: Sculpture, Photography

Kenneth Duane Snelson (June 29, 1927 – December 22, 2016) was an American contemporary sculptor and photographer. His sculptural works, exemplified by Needle Tower, are composed of flexible and rigid components arranged according to the idea of tensegrity, although Snelson preferred the descriptive term floating compression.

Snelson said his former professor Buckminster Fuller took credit for Snelson's discovery of the concept that Fuller named tensegrity. Fuller gave the idea its name, combining 'tension' and 'structural integrity.' Kārlis Johansons had exhibited tensegrity sculptures several years before Snelson was even born. The height and strength of Snelson's sculptures, which are often delicate in appearance, depend on the tension between rigid pipes and flexible cables.

== Biography ==
Snelson was born in Pendleton, Oregon, in 1927. He studied at the University of Oregon in Eugene, at the Black Mountain College, and with Fernand Léger in Paris. His sculpture and photography have been exhibited at over 25 one-man shows in galleries around the world including the structurally seminal Park Place Gallery in New York in the 1960s. Snelson also did research on the shape of the atom. Snelson continued to work in his SoHo studio, occasionally collaborating with animator Jonathan Monaghan. He lived in New York City with his wife, Katherine.

He held five United States patents: #3,169,611: Discontinuous Compression Structures, February 1965; #3,276,148: Model for Atomic Forms, October 1966; #4,099,339: Model for Atomic Forms, July 1978; and #6,017,220: Magnetic Geometric Building System; and most recently, #6,739,937: Space Frame Structure Made by 3-D Weaving of Rod Members, May 25, 2004.

Snelson was a founding member of ConStruct, the artist-owned gallery that promoted and organized large-scale sculpture exhibitions throughout the United States. Other founding members include Mark di Suvero, John Raymond Henry, Lyman Kipp and Charles Ginnever. Snelson was also a pioneer of digital art, using a Silicon Graphics machine to produce artistic images in the 1980s.

After suffering from prostate cancer, Snelson died on December 22, 2016, at the age of 89.

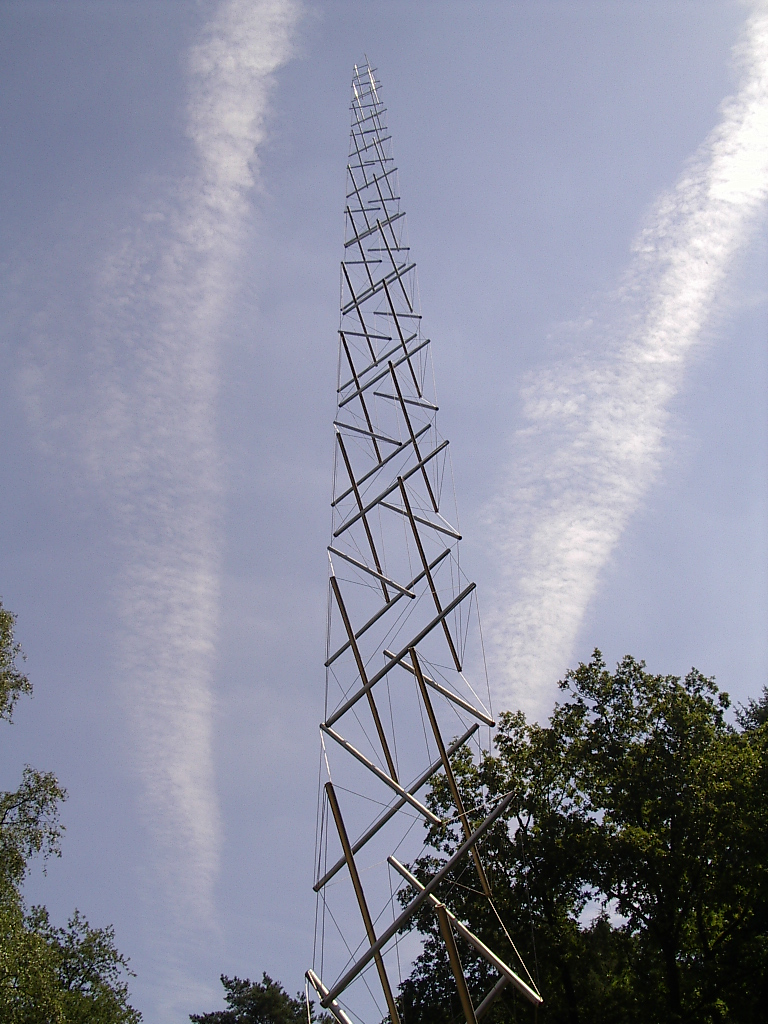
Needle Tower II, 1968 (Kröller-Müller Museum, Otterlo, Netherlands)

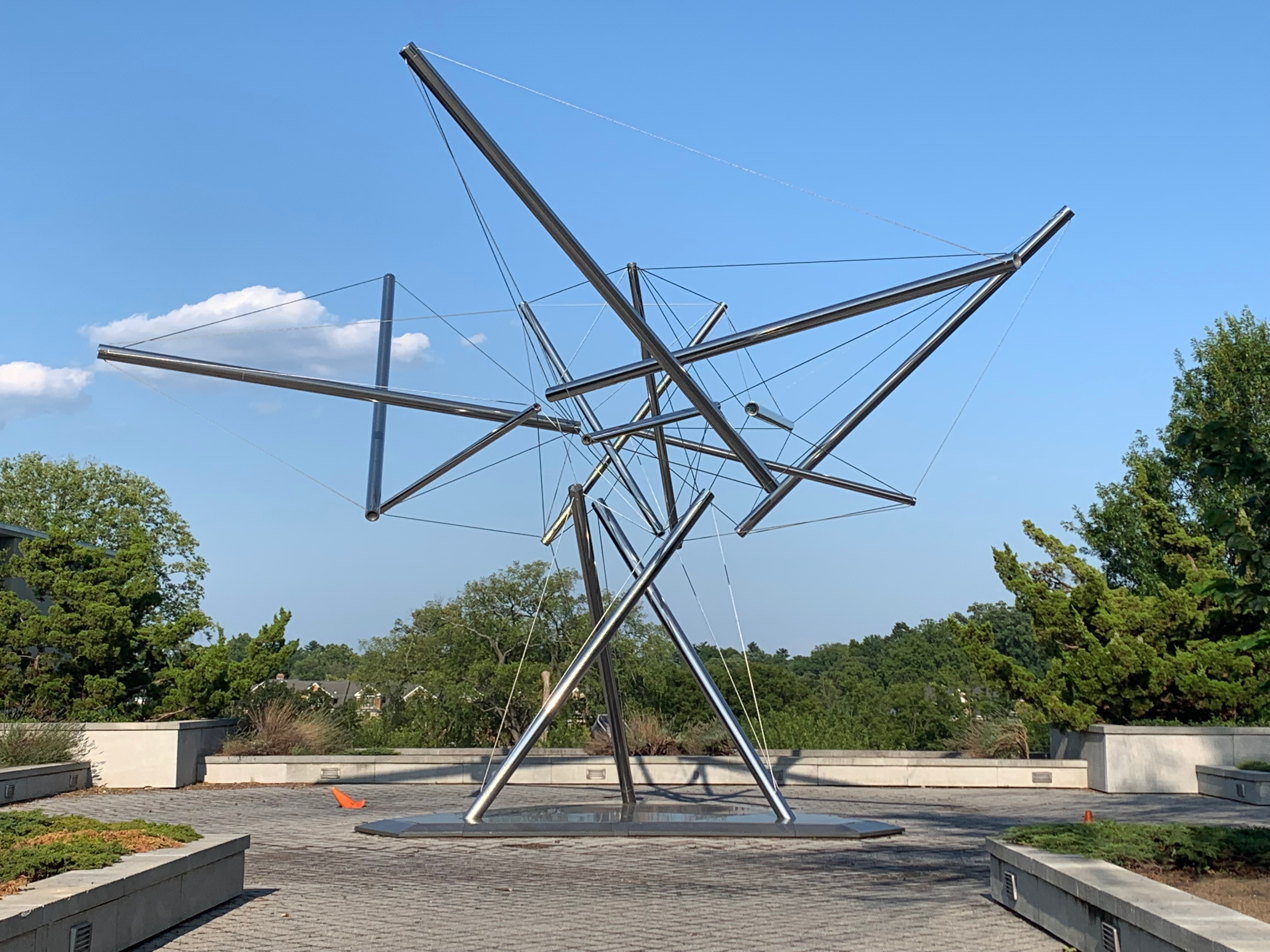
B-Tree, 1981 (National Institutes of Health, Bethesda, Maryland)

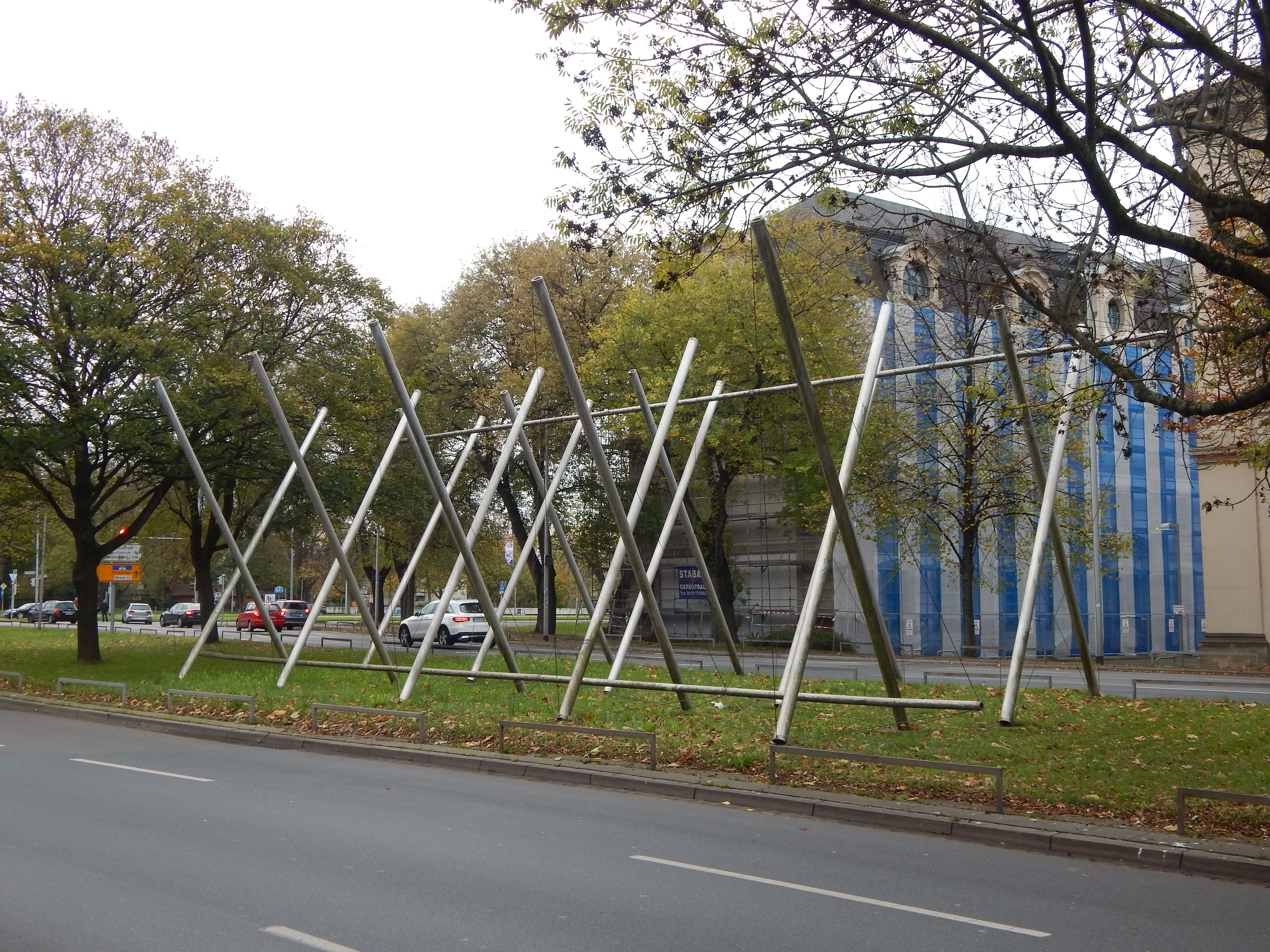
Avenue K, 1968 (Hannover, Germany)

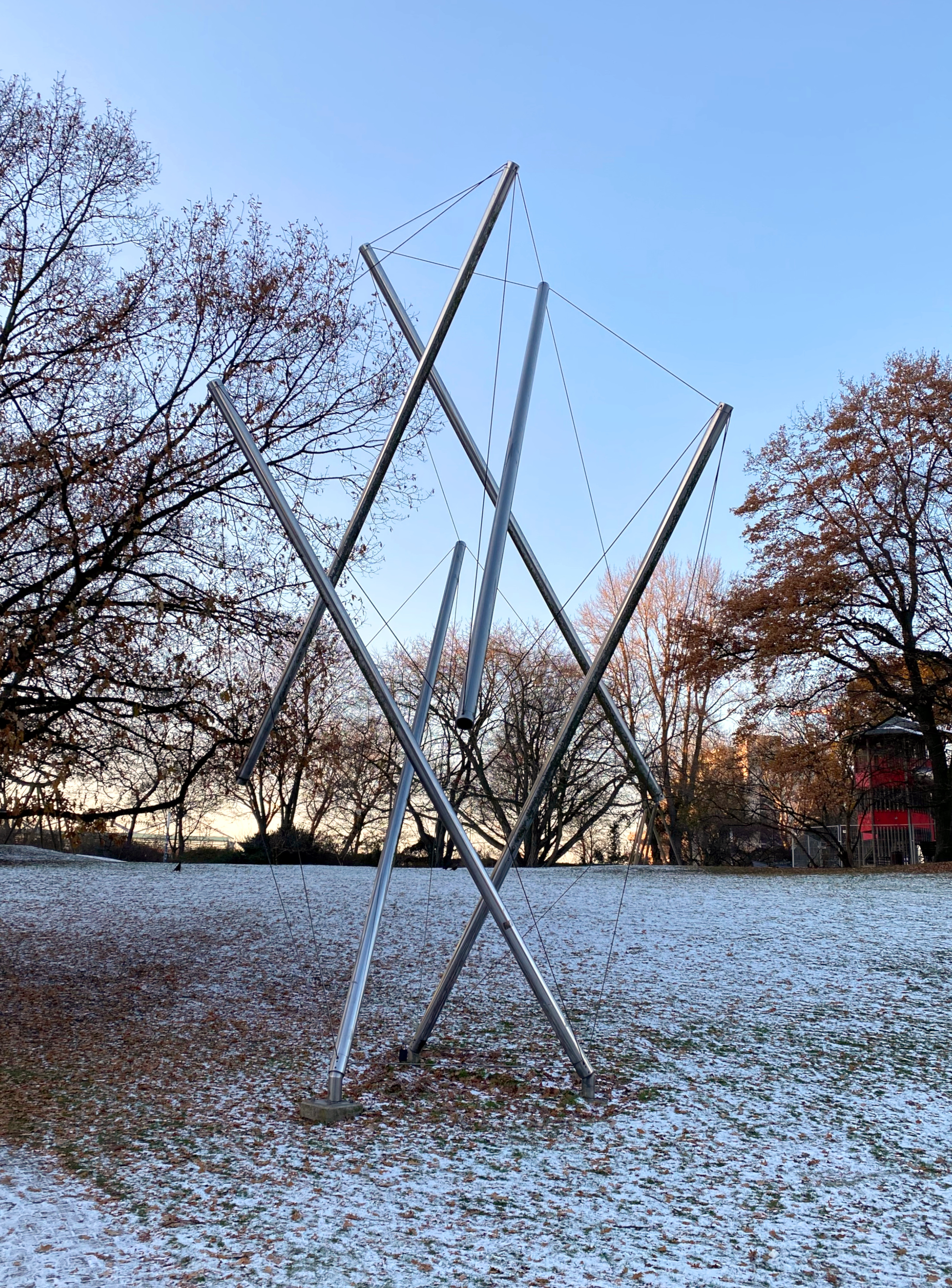
Osaka II, park Planten un Blomen, Hamburg

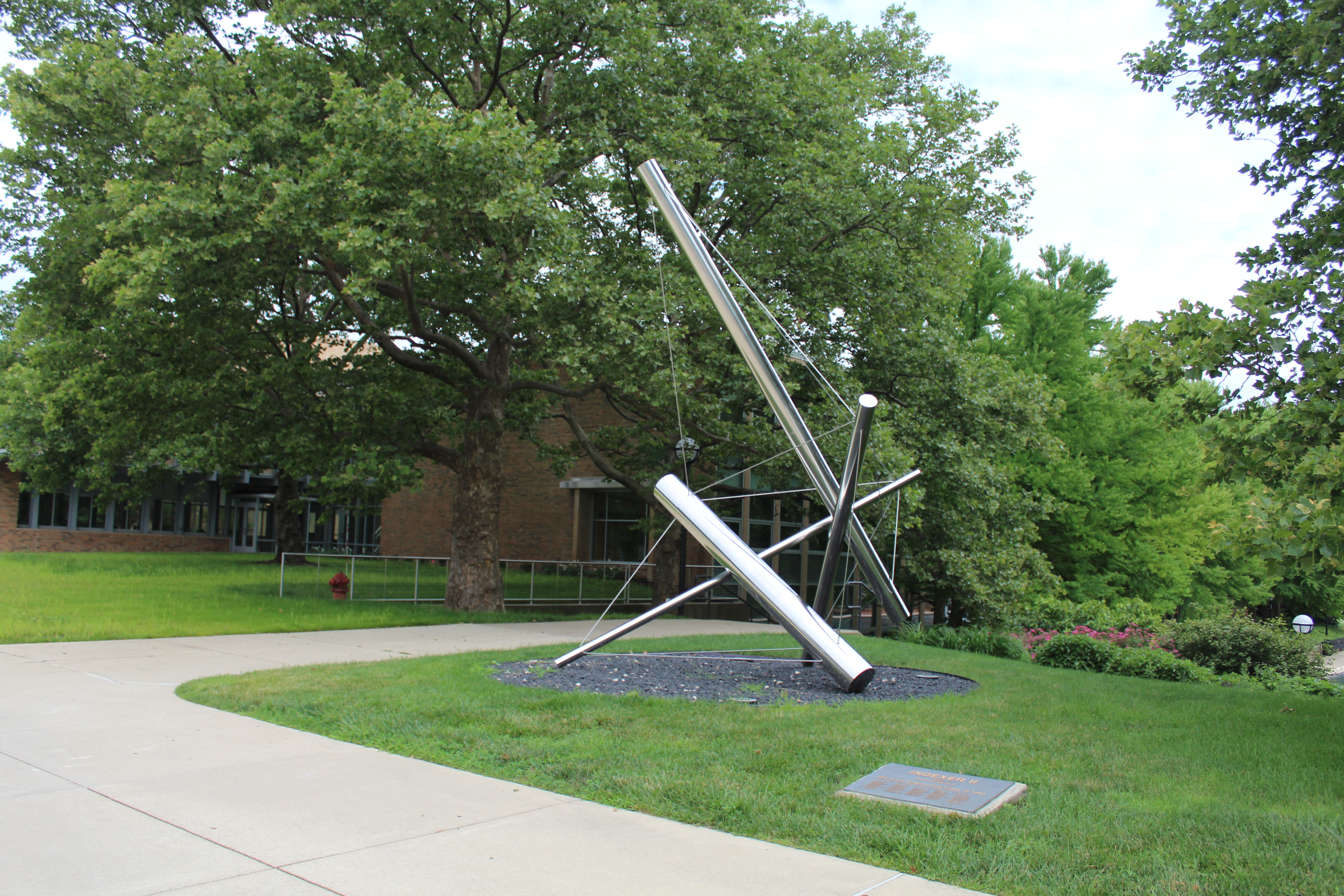
"Indexer II" Sculpture, University of Michigan North Campus, Ann Arbor, Michigan

== Work ==
During his early years as an art student, Snelson drew an interest for the tensegrity approach. Buckminster Fuller formalized a lot of the concept, but Snelson clearly contributed to its development. Through his proximity with Bauhaus artists (Léger) and Abstract expressionists painter (de Kooning), Snelson was mainly drawn to the exploration of tensegrity and space. He claimed he developed his own empirical mathematics system to create his structures, but denies being a mathematician. He says he never found a way to formalize through mathematics the logic of his structures, and never met someone who could.

== Honours and awards ==
- (1999) Lifetime Achievement in Contemporary Sculpture Award, International Sculpture Center.

== Sculptures in public collections and public spaces ==
=== United States ===
==== Alabama ====
- Mora Terry II, Birmingham Museum of Art, Birmingham

==== California ====
- City Boots, 1968, J. Patrick Lannon Foundation, Los Angeles
- Mozart I, 1982, Stanford University, Palo Alto

==== District of Columbia ====
- Needle Tower, 1968, Hirshhorn Museum and Sculpture Garden, Washington
- Untitled Maquette, 1975, Hirshhorn Museum and Sculpture Garden, Washington

==== Florida ====
- Newport, 1968, M. Margulies, Coconut Grove
- Double City Boots, 1967, MDC Wolfson Campus, Miami
- X-Planar Tower, John and Mable Ringling Museum of Art, Sarasota

==== Iowa ====
- Four Module Piece, 1968, Riverfront Crossings Park, Iowa City

==== Louisiana ====
- Virlane Tower, 1981, Sydney and Walda Besthoff Sculpture Garden at NOMA, New Orleans

==== Maryland ====
- B-Tree, 1981, National Institutes of Health, Bethesda
- Easy Landing, 1977, City of Baltimore, Baltimore
- Six Number Two, 1967, Annmarie Sculpture Garden (Smithsonian partner/annex site), Solomons, Maryland

==== Massachusetts ====
- Mozart III, 2008, Science Center, Wellesley College, Wellesley,

==== Michigan ====
- Indexer II, 2001, University of Michigan, Ann Arbor
- B-Tree II, 2005, Frederik Meijer Gardens & Sculpture Park, Grand Rapids

==== Missouri ====
- Triple Crown, 1991, Hallmark, Inc., Kansas City, Missouri

==== Nebraska ====
- Able Charlie, 1983, Joslyn Art Museum, Omaha

==== New Jersey ====
- Northwood II, 1970, Compton Quad, Graduate College, Princeton, Mercer

==== New York ====
- Coronation Day, 1980, City of Buffalo, Buffalo
- E.C. Column, 1969–81, Albright-Knox Art Gallery, Buffalo
- Four Chances, 1982, Albright Knox Museum, Buffalo
- Fair Leda, 1969, Nelson Rockefeller Estate
- Free Ride Home, 1974, Storm King Art Center, Mountainville
- Mozart II, 1982, Donald M. Kendall Sculpture Garden at Pepsico, Purchase
- Sun River, 1967, Whitney Museum of American Art, New York
- One World Trade Center antenna/spire, 2006, One World Trade Center, New York

==== North Carolina ====
- Northwood II(maquette), 1970, Asheville Art Museum, Asheville

==== Pennsylvania ====
- Forest Devil, 1975–77, Museum of Art, Carnegie Institute, Pittsburgh

==== Ohio ====
- Forest Devil, 1975, University of Cincinnati, Cincinnati
- V-X, 1968, Columbus Museum of Art, Columbus
- Rainbow Arch, Seltzer Sculpture Park, 11205 Harborview Dr, Cleveland, OH 44102

==== Oklahoma ====
- Sleeping Dragon, 2002–03, Kirkpatrick Oil Company Building, Oklahoma City

==== Tennessee ====
- Dragon II, 2005, Knoxville Museum of Art, Knoxville
- V-X-II, 1973-4, Hunter Museum, Chattanooga

==== Texas ====
- Northwood, 1969, Northwood Institute, Cedar Hills

==== Vermont ====
- "Hard Wired", Bennington (College)

==== Wisconsin ====
- Northwoods III, 1970, Milwaukee Art Museum, Milwaukee

=== International ===
==== Germany ====
- Soft Landing, 1975–77, Berlin Nationalgalerie, Berlin
- Avenue K, 1968, City of Hannover

==== The Netherlands ====
- Easy-K, 1970, Sonsbeek ‘70, Arnhem
- Needle Tower II, 1969, Kröller Müller Museum, Otterlo

==== Japan ====
- Osaka, 1970, Japan Iron & Steel Federation, Kobe
- Needle Tower II, 1989, Shiga Prefecture Museum, Shiga
- T-Zone Flight, 1995, JT Building, Toranomon, Tokyo
- Landing, 1970, Wakayama Prefecture Museum, Wakayama

=== Location unknown ===
- Audrey I, 1966, Private Collection
- Audrey II, 1966, Private Collection
- Equilateral Quivering Tower, 1973–92
- Tri-Core Column, 1974
- Wing I, 1992; Ed. 4, Private collection : University of Puerto Rico – Mayaguez
- Rainbow Arch, 2001, Private collection displayed at Seltzer Sculpture Garden, Cleveland, OH
- Dragon, 2000–03

== See also ==
- Space frame
- Kārlis Johansons, tensegrity innovator
