= Louisa Chase =

American artist (1951–2016)

Louisa Lizbeth Chase
- Louisa Chase in 1983. Credit Peter Bellamy
- Born: March 18, 1951; Panama City, Panama
- Died: May 8, 2016 (aged 65); East Hampton, New York
- Known for: Painting
- Movement: New Image Painting

Louisa Lizbeth Chase (March 18, 1951 – May 8, 2016) was an American neo-expressionist painter and printmaker.

== Life ==
Chase was born in 1951 in Panama City, Panama. She grew up in Lancaster, Pennsylvania. She earned her BFA in printmaking from Syracuse University in 1973 and her MFA in fine art from Yale University School of Art in New Haven, Connecticut, in 1975. In the year of her graduation she had her first New York exhibition, at the alternative gallery Artists Space.

She taught painting at the Rhode Island School of Design from 1975 to 1979, and at the School of Visual Arts from 1980 to 1982. She was a National Endowment for the Arts grantee.

She exhibited at the 1984 Venice Biennale. Her solo exhibitions include: Brooke Alexander Gallery (1989) The Texas Gallery in Houston (1987); Gallery Inge Baker in Cologne, Germany (1983) and others. She had solo exhibitions at Boston’s Institute of Contemporary Art, Wisconsin’s Madison Art Center, and Baltimore’s Contemporary Museum. Her work was featured in group exhibitions at the New Museum, the Whitney Museum, the Rhode Island School of Design’s Museum of Art, SFMoMA, LACMA and the Brooklyn Museum.

Her work is in the collections of: the Museum of Modern Art, the Metropolitan Museum of Art, the Whitney Museum of American Art, the Corcoran Gallery, the Library of Congress, the Minneapolis Institute of Arts, the Walker Art Center, the Mount Holyoke College Art Museum, the Syracuse University Art Museum, the Denver Art Museum, the Elvehjem Museum of Art, and the Madison Museum of Contemporary Art.

Chase lived in Sag Harbor, New York. She died on May 8, 2016, in East Hampton, New York, at the age of 65.

== Art ==
Swimmer by Louisa Chase, 1991, oil on canvas, Honolulu Museum of Art

Louisa Chase is known for her use of schematically drawn body parts (i.e. hands, feet, torsos) and elements of landscape, separately or combined. She used a bright color palette and geometric forms. Chase paid special attention to the brushstrokes and markings in wood in her pieces. Chase’s work shows influence from New Image Painting and Neo-Expressionism.

Chase’s paintings often have a sense of juxtaposition between disturbing imagery and lightness or even humor of style. “When peopled, her fragments of place are inhabited by partial figures: torsos, hands, feet. They are hovering or falling or drowning or being assumed into the sky.” This imagery is contrasted by the cartoonish style with which Chase would symbolize these body parts, the many energetic brushstrokes and the bold colors she would use. Swimmer, in the collection of the Honolulu Museum of Art, is an example of Chase's use of cartoonish human bodies and body parts rendered in geometric shapes.

== Exhibitions ==
- 1975 Artists Space, New York
- 1979 Chase's work "Tears, Ocean II" part of Painting: The Eighties at NYU
- 1985 New Currents: Louisa Chase. Institute of Contemporary Art, Boston
- 1996 Madison Art Center
- 2008 Goya Contemporary & Goya–Girl Press in Baltimore, Maryland

== Works and publications ==
- Chase, Louisa (1982). Louisa Chase. New York, N.Y.: Robert Miller Gallery.
- Chase, Louisa; Salcman, Michael (2003). Louisa Chase : New Paintings. Baltimore, Md.: Contemporary Museum.
- Amenoff, Gregory; Tallman, Susan (1989). Contemporary Woodblock Prints: Gregory Amenoff, Richard Bosman, Louisa Chase ... Jersey City, N.J.: Jersey City Museum.
- Arlen, Nancy; Heintz, Rudy; Chase, Louisa (1980). New Work/New York. New York, N.Y.: New Museum.
