= Gloria Duffy =

American government official

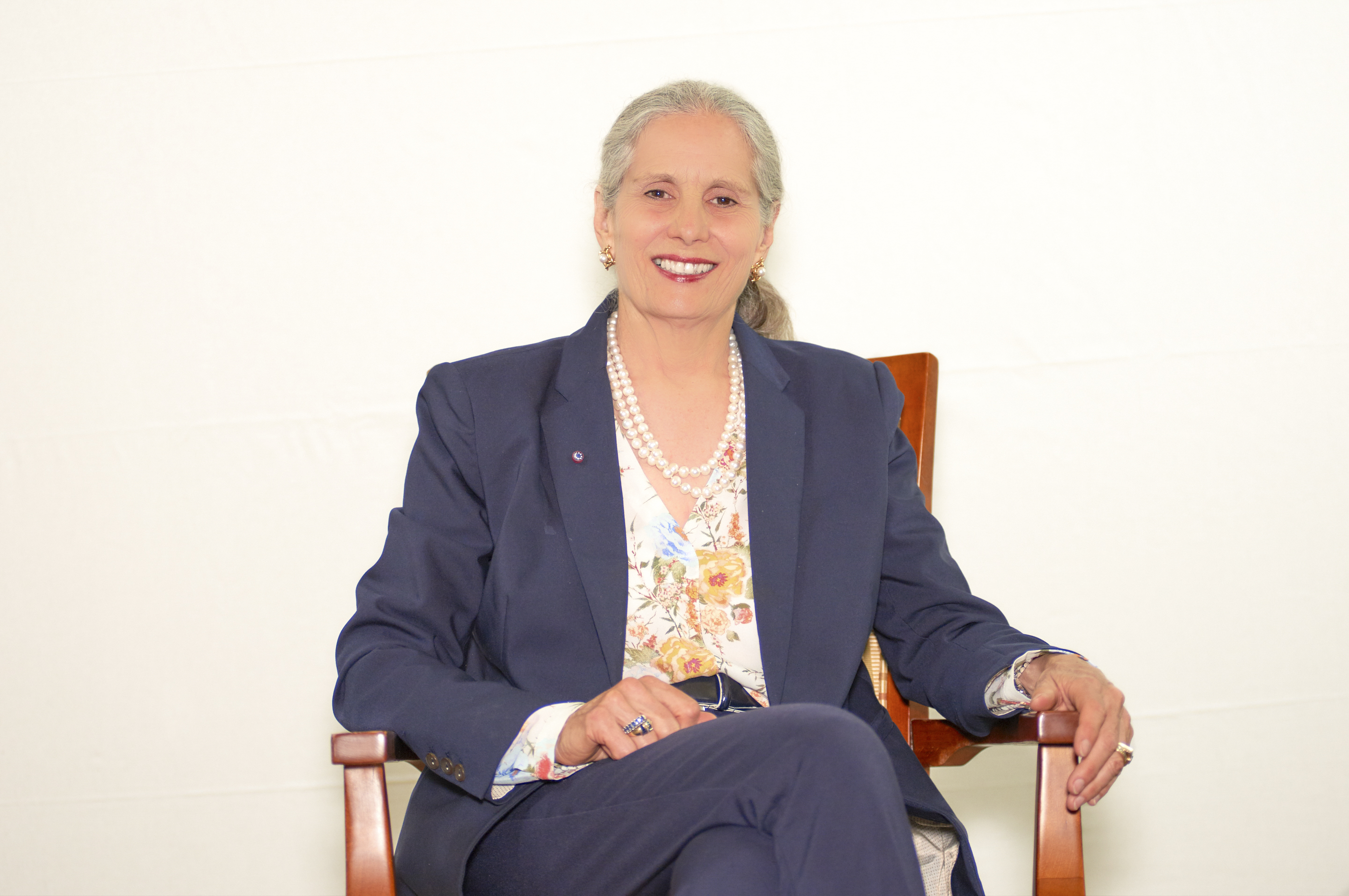
- Duffy in 2017
- Born: Gloria Charmian Duffy; September 4, 1953 (age 73)
- Education: Occidental College (BA); Columbia University (PhD)
- Occupation: CEO of the Commonwealth Club of California
- Known for: U.S. Department of Defense official
- Spouse: Rod Diridon Sr. (m. 2001; died 2026)

Gloria Charmian Duffy (born September 4, 1953) is a former U.S. Department of Defense official, businesswoman, social entrepreneur and nonprofit executive. Since 1996, she has been the president, CEO and a member of the Board of Governors of the Commonwealth Club of California, America's largest and oldest public forum, founded in 1903. From 2010 to 2017 she led the fundraising, acquisition, financing, design, entitlements and construction of the club's first headquarters building, at 110 The Embarcadero in San Francisco. The grand opening for the club's new building took place on September 12, 2017. The building received a 2016 California Heritage Council award for historic preservation. She is the "voice" of the Commonwealth Club radio broadcast, heard weekly on 230 stations throughout the US, which has been on the air continuously for 101 years, since 1924.

In February, 2022 Speaker of the US House of Representatives Nancy Pelosi appointed Duffy to be a member of the Congressional Commission on the Strategic Posture of the United States. The Strategic Posture Commission submitted its report to the Congress and the Executive Branch in October, 2023.

== Early life and education ==
Duffy's mother was Gloria S Duffy, a pioneering radio broadcaster in Missouri, Denver and San Francisco, as well Fashion Director of San Francisco's City of Paris department store and a philanthropist. Beloved in her community, Gloria Senior was a board member of United Way of the Bay Area and the American Red Cross Northern California Coastal Region, and a recipient of the Red Cross's Clara Barton Award for outstanding humanitarian service and volunteer leadership. She died in 2022. Gloria Jr. attended public schools in Lafayette, California, and began working in her family's real estate and land development office while a student at M. H. Stanley Middle School in 1965. She also taught sports to developmentally and intellectually challenged kids at Las Trampas School, through Futures Explored in Lafayette. She graduated from Acalanes High School in 1971, completing a full curriculum of life science courses. She excelled in Spanish, receiving a medal for her proficiency from the National Society of Teachers of Spanish and Portuguese. She was the editor-in-chief of the school newspaper, The Blueprint. While a student, she was on the Lafayette School District's Drug Education Committee. She also co-founded, with her classmate Dr. Donald Goff, the Lafayette Youth Services Commission, which marked its 50th anniversary in 2021.

Duffy holds a 1975 A.B. degree magna cum laude from Occidental College in Los Angeles, where her general studies track was science and human values, her major was interdisciplinary studies, she was a College Scholar and she was co-editor-in-chief of The Occidental Weekly, the campus newspaper. She was on the college's Educational Policy and Curriculum Committee.

Duffy holds a doctorate, an M.Phil. and an M.A. in political science, from Columbia University in New York, where she was a Presidents' Fellow, studied with the late Marshall D. Shulman, and was a research assistant to Zbigniew Brzezinski. She was also research assistant to Dr. Gordon Adams. Her master's thesis was on the impact of US and Soviet policies in Iran and Iraq in the early 1970s on the two countries' Kurdish populations, completed with support from the Carnegie Endowment for International Peace in Washington, D.C., where she was a Humanitarian Policy Studies Fellow in the summer of 1976.

After completing her coursework at Columbia at the end of 1976, Duffy worked as a resident consultant at the Rand Corporation in Santa Monica, California and then as Communications Director at the Arms Control Association in Washington, D.C., before returning to academia to complete her Ph.D.

In 1980, Dr. Coit Blacker invited Duffy to become an Arms Control Fellow at Stanford University's Arms Control Program. Duffy held a Hubert H. Humphrey Doctoral Dissertation Fellowship, from the US Arms Control and Disarmament Agency, which supported the preparation of her Columbia University doctoral thesis while at CISAC, on the impact of US domestic politics on the non-ratification of the SALT II Treaty. She was one of four female fellows Blacker recruited, notable in the largely male international security and arms control field, including Condoleezza Rice, who later became National Security Advisor to President George W. Bush and Secretary of State; the late Janne Nolan, and Cynthia Roberts. Duffy and Rice lived together in a rented house in Palo Alto. Nolan began calling the group "the Fellowettes," a name that stuck and the group became life-long friends and colleagues.

== Career ==
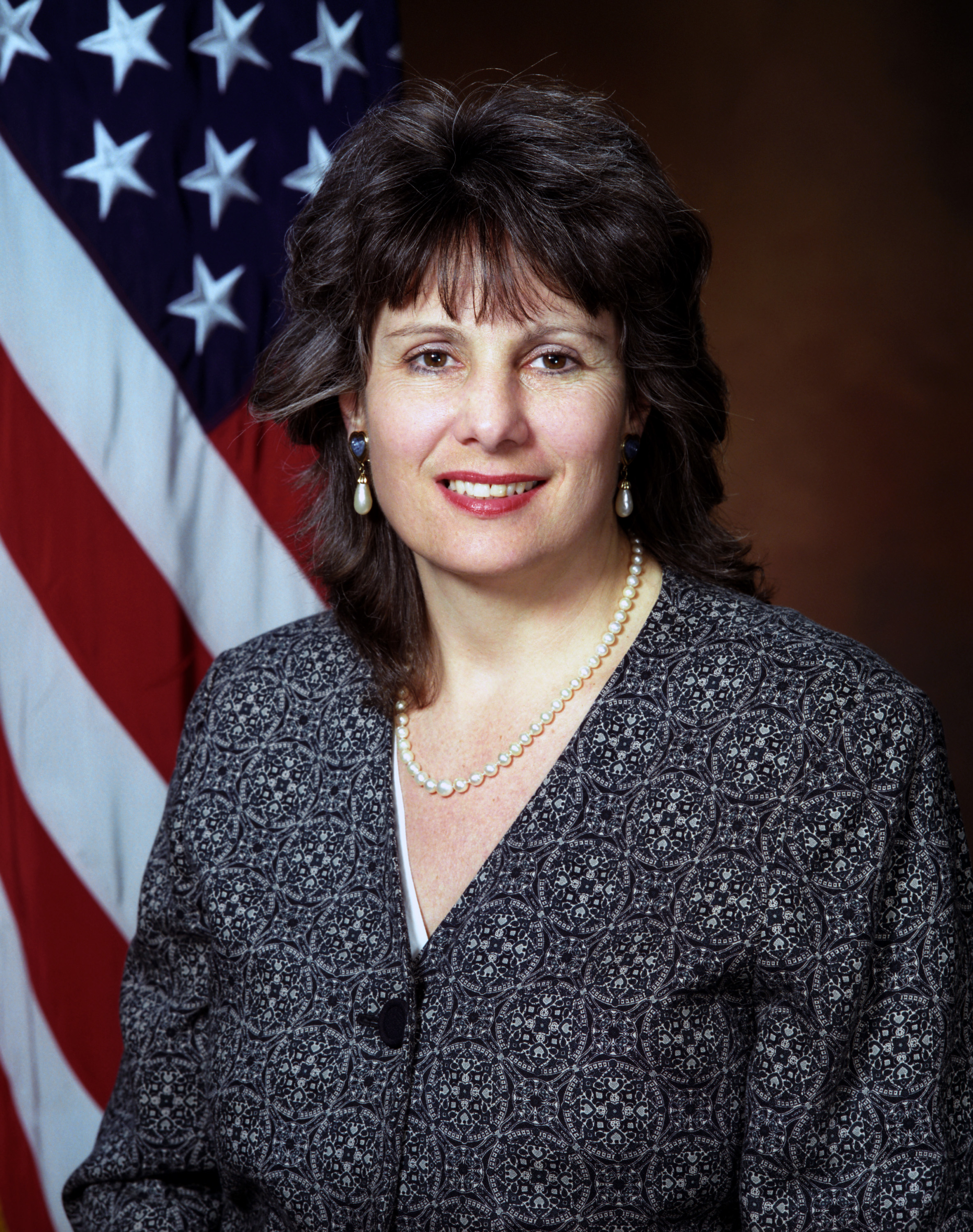
DASD Gloria C Duffy in 1995

Duffy has had a varied career, including research, journalism, education, business, management, scientific collaboration and research funding, philanthropy, public service at the local and national levels, defense and arms control policy, international arms negotiations, conflict resolution and real estate management and development. She has founded, been President/CEO and chaired the board of a number of projects and organizations, including as the CEO of three organizations for a total of 46 years. Organizations she has founded, co-founded, of which she has chaired the board or was President and CEO include the Lafayette Youth Services Commission, Global Outlook, Ploughshares Fund, the World Forum of Silicon Valley, CRDF Global, the Guadalupe River Park Conservancy and the Commonwealth Club of California.

=== RAND Corporation ===
From 1977 to 1978, Duffy was a Resident Consultant at the RAND Corporation in Santa Monica, California. RAND was supporting the International Nuclear Fuel Cycle Evaluation (INFCE) for the US Department of Energy. Duffy authored a study for INFCE of Soviet nuclear exports and non-proliferation policies.

=== Arms Control Association ===
From 1978 to 1980 she was Communications Director of the Arms Control Association, in Washington, D.C. and editor of its publication, Arms Control Today, which she and her colleagues improved and upgraded.

=== CISAC at Stanford ===
Duffy has been associated for 45 years with CISAC (in its early years called The Arms Control Program) at Stanford, returning as a fellow in residence from 1985 to 1987 and from 1995 to 1996, teaching, participating in several policy research projects and leading one of them, and editing/authoring two books. She was on the Board of Visitors, renamed the International Advisory Board, of the Freeman Spogli Institute, of which CISAC is a part, at Stanford for 22 years. She reflected on the early history of CISAC, the impact of its work and her colleagues including physicists Dr. Sidney Drell and Dr. Wolfgang Panofsky, Dr. Condoleezza Rice and the other "fellowettes," Dr. Blacker, China scholar Dr. John Lewis, Secretary of Defense Dr. William Perry and others at CISAC at its 25th anniversary commemoration in 2009. She also spoke about the impact of the Arms Control Program's founder, and CISAC's first co-director, Dr. John Lewis, at a conference commemorating his legacy, held at Stanford in January, 2018. She was also proud to co-chair CISAC's 40th anniversary celebration, in 2024, with her life-long colleague Dr. Blacker.

=== Ploughshares Fund ===
In 1982, Duffy become the first executive director of a start-up organisation, Ploughshares Fund, a public foundation initiated in San Francisco by philanthropist Sally Lilienthal, former Nixon Administration official Lewis H. Butler and others. Ploughshares Fund works directly and provides grants to individuals and institutions working to diminish the threats of nuclear war and nuclear proliferation. She was executive director, 1982–1984, setting up initial grantmaking guidelines and procedures, helping to shape the funding priorities and process, and undertaking a number of special projects. During her tenure, Ploughshares funded a project between the US Natural Resources Defense Council and the Soviet Academy of Sciences to establish and collect data from seismic stations near the Soviet Semipalatinsk Nuclear Test Site, demonstrating that seismic monitoring of low-level nuclear tests was possible. Demonstrating the verifiability of a low-threshold nuclear test ban enabled the United Nations to adopt the Comprehensive Nuclear-Test-Ban Treaty in 1996. In the years since, she has been on both the board of directors and the advisory board of Ploughshares Fund. She is currently a member of the advisory board.

=== John D. and Catherine T. MacArthur Foundation ===
From 1984 to 1985, Duffy worked with Ruth Adams at the MacArthur Foundation in the creation of its International Peace and Security Program. In 1992 to 1993 she returned to the Foundation to assist in creating a funding program in the former Soviet Union and in the establishment of its Moscow office. She was in the 1980s and 1990s on the selection committee for the International Peace and Security Program's research and writing grants.

=== Global Outlook ===
In 1985, Duffy founded the independent research institute Global Outlook, based in Palo Alto, California which focused on US-Soviet relations and international security in the nuclear age. She was its president and CEO until 1993. Global Outlook undertook research, public policy advising and public education on issues including arms control treaty compliance and dispute resolution, the political psychology of the nuclear arms race, the sources and implications of "new thinking" about international relations under the Gorbachev leadership in the Soviet Union and verification of a chemical weapons treaty. Global Outlook also worked with new parliamentary leaders in the former Soviet countries to assist in their transition to civil society and civilian oversight of national security.

Books authored by Global Outlook staff included Compliance and the Future of Arms Control by Gloria Duffy, Greg Dalton, Matthew State and Leo Sartori; Minds at War by Steven Kull, and Burying Lenin by Steven Kull. Global Outlook's project on arms control compliance led to a 1987 hearing before the United States House Committee on Foreign Affairs on the validity of cases the Reagan Administration was making that the Soviet Union was cheating on arms control agreements, at which Duffy and other Stanford and Global Outlook experts testified.

Between 1991 and 1993, Global Outlook held six consultations among parliamentary leaders of the new Independent States and American national security and arms control experts, Members of Congress and Congressional staff members. Topics included the role of parliamentary committees in oversight of national security, non-proliferation of nuclear weapons and control of nuclear exports, the transition from defense economies to peacetime productivity, legislative oversight of the defense budget, war powers and legislative oversight and the arms trade in a transitional economy. The reports from the conferences were published by Global Outlook.

Global Outlook staff and fellows later founded or led organizations, institutes and programs. These include Global Outlook Senior Research Associate and psychologist Dr. Steven Kull who founded and leads several public opinion research organizations, including Voice of the People; Deputy Director Greg Dalton who founded and heads Climate One, at the Commonwealth Club; Global Outlook Deputy Director Dr. Ruth Shapiro, who founded and has headed several organizations, including the Center for Asian Philanthropy and Society in Hong Kong; Global Outlook Deputy Director Leslie Saul Garvin went on to work in positions at 3Com and Siemans Corporations and at TechNet, and is Associate Director for Executive Education at the Stanford University Graduate School of Business; Leonid Zagalsky, a Russian journalist who joined Global Outlook in 1992 after his Knight Fellowship at Stanford, became a Contributing Editor of the Bulletin of the Atomic Scientists and a project coordinator for the Committee to Protect Journalists, then returned to Russia to produce independent films.; Dr. Matthew State], a research associate at Global Outlook, who is Chair of the Department of Psychiatry at the University of California, San Francisco; Dr. Karen Peabody O'Brien], a research associate at Global Outlook, who went on to work for the W. Alton Jones Foundation, and founded the Advancing Green Chemistry Institute, and Dr. Kiron Skinner, research associate at Global Outlook, who was the Director of Policy Planning at the US Department of State, co-authored two books on President Ronald Reagan, and is the founding Director of the Institute for Politics and Strategy at Carnegie Mellon University.

Funders of Global Outlook included the John D. and Catherine T. MacArthur Foundation, the United States Institute of Peace, The Compton Foundation, Rockefeller Family Associates, the Winston Foundation, the Joyce Mertz-Gilmore Foundation, the S.H. Cowell Foundation, the W. Alton Jones Foundation and the Carnegie Corporation of New York.

Board members were Dr. Coit Blacker, Chair; Hon. Margaret Carpenter, Denis Hayes, the late Dr. Janne E. Nolan and Susan Reed Clark. Advisory Board members were the late George Bunn, the late Dr. Alexander George, Michael Krepon, Dr. Robert Legvold, the late Dr. Wolfgang Panofsky, the late Dr. Marshall Shulman, Colette Shulman, Wayne Silby and the late Dr. Richard Smoke.

Global Outlook closed in 1993, after Duffy and Blacker were appointed to positions in the Clinton Administration.

=== DoD and Dismantling WMD in the former Soviet Union ===
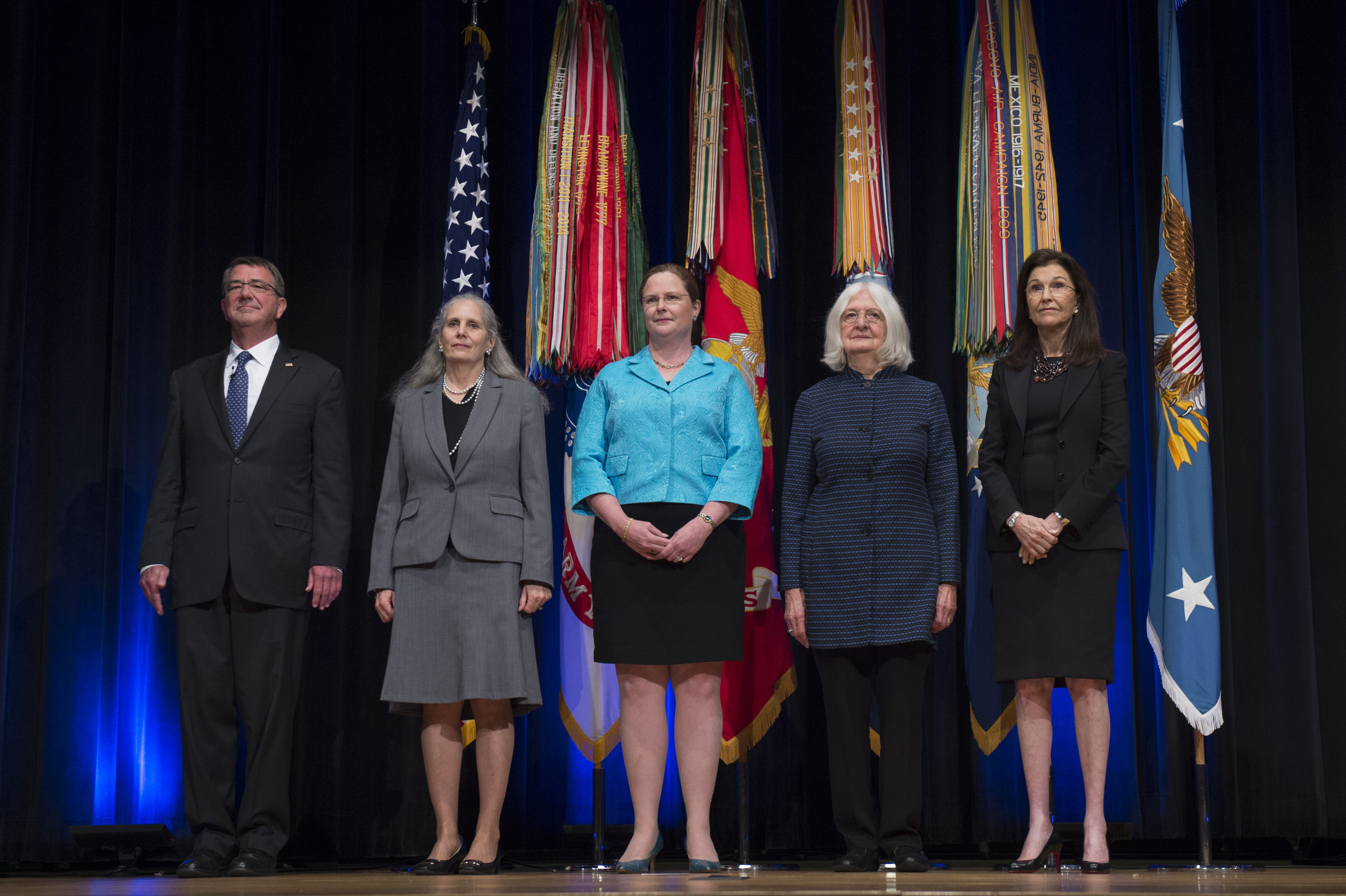
Secretary of Defense Ash Carter with 25th anniversary Nunn-Lugar Trailblazer Award recipients Dr. Gloria Duffy, Ms. Laura Holgate, Dr. Susan Koch and Ms. Jane Wales in 2016

Duffy was deputy assistant secretary of defense, Special Coordinator for Cooperative Threat Reduction, and secretary of defense representative and deputy head to the safety, security and dismantlement talks, under Defense Secretaries Les Aspin and William Perry and Assistant Secretary Ashton Carter, in the Clinton Administration. Washington Post columnist Al Kamen joked in his In The Loop column that she had the longest title of any Clinton Administration appointee. She was responsible for negotiating the dismantlement and destruction of weapons of mass destruction in Russia, Ukraine, Belarus and Kazakhstan. With Ambassador James Goodby and other colleagues, she completed over fifty agreements with these countries for dismantling and disposing of their weapons of mass destruction, managing a $400 million annual budget. She received the Secretary of Defense Award for Outstanding Public Service in 1995. In May 2016, the 25th anniversary of the Nunn-Lugar legislation, Secretary of Defense Ash Carter presented Duffy and four other individuals with inaugural Nunn-Lugar Trailblazer Awards, at a ceremony at the Pentagon. In December 2016, also marking the 25th anniversary of the Nunn-Lugar legislation, Duffy and her colleagues Amb. James Goodby, General Roland LaJoie and others, reflected on the history of the Cooperative Threat Reduction Program, at a panel in the Russell Senate Office Building.

=== Civilian Research and Development Foundation ===
In 1995, while at the Defense Department, Duffy responded to a request from the White House to fund a newly created organization, the Civilian Research and Development Foundation (CRDF Global), providing the initial $5 million for its budget from Defense Department funds, which was then matched by philanthropist George Soros. Its creation, through the U.S. National Science Foundation, was mandated by the U.S. Congress, led by the late House Science and Technology Committee Chairman George Brown Jr. The initial purpose was to provide employment in civilian scientific research to former Soviet WMD scientists who were unemployed or underemployed, and whose skills might be in demand by countries or groups seeking to obtain weapons of mass destruction.

After leaving the U.S. government, Duffy sat on, then chaired, the board of directors of the CRDF. She was on the board from 1996 to 2009, and chaired the board for ten years, from 1998 until 2008. During this time, the organization grew to raise and spend nearly $300 million in government and private funds, and expanded its operations worldwide. CRDF Global is a major funder for collaborative scientific research between American scientists and colleagues in other countries. It provides alternative employment for weapons scientists, promotes scientific collaboration on global health problems like HIV/AIDS, tuberculosis, biosafety and biosecurity, helps emerging countries to develop science and technology based economies, and helps the U.S. to form scientific links in other countries.

== Civil Rights, Equity and Justice ==
Duffy began her work on equity and justice by volunteering for Wilson Riles in his campaign for California State Superintendent of Public Instruction, while in high school in 1970. Riles was the first African-American to win statewide elected office in California.

In 1972, as a college freshman, she travelled to what was then Rhodesia, in Southern Africa, to study the attitudes of the white minority in Rhodesia and the prospect for majority rule. She turned the interviews for her academic research into a four-part series of articles for The Occidental Weekly, arguing that the hardline and racist white attitudes she documented would lead to conflict and violence. The series, titled "The Country that Doesn't Exist," won a Los Angeles Press Club student journalism award, in 1974.

In 1987, she co-founded the World Forum of Silicon Valley, based in San Jose, to host dialogue among different communities about global issues. Duffy was the first board president until 1993, followed by Santa Clara County Municipal Court Judge Jerome Nadler. The organization was incorporated into the Commonwealth Club in 1997.

Beginning in 2020, Duffy initiated and coordinates an Equity and Justice Task Force at the Commonwealth Club.

== Mediation and conflict resolution ==
Duffy has been a mediator and in conflict resolution initiatives including a 1998 effort working, together with Stanford colleagues Alexander Dallin and Gail Lapidus and Ambassador James Goodby, with the national security advisors to the presidents of Armenia, Azerbaijan and Georgia to build trust and reduce hostility among the three countries. Participants from the Caucasus countries included Gerard Libaridian, national security advisor to Armenian President Levon Ter-Petrosyan; Archil Gegeshidze, national security advisor to Georgian President Eduard Shevardnadze, and the national security advisor to President Heydar Aliyev of Azerbaijan.

In 1997, as president of the Guadalupe River Park and Gardens Corporation in San Jose, she brought together environmental activists and public agencies at odds over environmental mitigation of a flood control project on the Guadalupe River, leading to a resolution of the issues and forward progress in the flood control project and creating the Guadalupe River Park.

== Board service, board leadership, professional committees, advisory boards ==
Duffy has been a trustee, chair of the board, president of the board, director and advisory board member of some two dozen organizations nationally and locally in the Bay Area. These include the Boards of Directors of:

−The Bulletin of the Atomic Scientists in Chicago

−Computer Professionals for Social Responsibility in Palo Alto, California

−Los Gatos Community Hospital, now El Camino Hospital

−She was a trustee of Occidental College in Los Angeles from 2006-2025, and was vice chair of its executive committee. She chaired the board's academic affairs and executive compensation committees, and co-chaired the board's Student Life and Enrollment Management Committee. She became a Trustee Emerita on June 30, 2025.

−She was a trustee and on the executive committee of Dominican University of California, in San Rafael, California.

−She is on the Board of the Circle Foundation

−She was Board President of the Guadalupe River Park Conservancy.

−She was for 10 years as Chair of the Board of CRDF Global.

−Duffy was for seven years a board director and treasurer of the Compton Foundation, funding on environmental, population and peace issues, where she stewarded the management of $120 million in assets.

She is an advisory board member for:

−Miracle Messages, which helps volunteers use videos and social media to reunite those experiencing homelessness with their family members and friends, provides them with basic monthly income and connects them with housed neighbors in the community.

−Voice of the People, a Washington, D.C., polling and public engagement organization.

−She was for over two decades on the international advisory board of the Freeman Spogli Institute for International Studies at Stanford University

− The Harriman Institute at Columbia University

−The Center for Nonproliferation Studies at the Middlebury Institute of International Studies in Monterey, CA.

In addition to her work for the MacArthur Foundation, she has chaired or been a member of committees funding grants, fellowships and scholarships for:

−The Truman Scholarships (the national memorial to President Truman) (California/other Western states selection committee member and chair, 10 years)

−The Office of the President, Vice President for Research, Lab Fees Grants Program, University of California system (social science panel chair)

−The Council on Foreign Relations in New York (CFR Fellows selection committee member)

−She has been on the Science, Arms Control and International Security Committee of the American Association for the Advancement of Science and on the selection committee for the Science and Technology Policy Fellows program.

She is a member of the Council on Foreign Relations and the Lafayette United Methodist Church.

== Teaching, books and other publications, Congressional testimony ==
Duffy has team-taught an arms control course at Stanford University, as well as guest-lectured at various colleges and universities. As communications director for the Arms Control Association, in Washington, D.C., from 1978 to 1980, she was editor of the magazine, Arms Control Today. She oversees The Commonwealth magazine at the Commonwealth Club, and oversaw publication of Each a Mighty Voice: A Century of Speeches from The Commonwealth Club of California, Heyday Books, 2004.

Duffy is the author or editor of a number of books and articles. Her first policy report was Power Politics: The Nuclear Industry and Nuclear Exports, with Dr. Gordon Adams, published by the Council on Economic Priorities in 1978, followed by Soviet Nuclear Energy: Domestic and International Policies, published in 1979 by the Rand Corporation. This was followed by the textbook Blacker and Duffy, International Arms Control Issues and Agreements, Stanford University Press, 1984 and Duffy, et al. Compliance and the Future of Arms Control, Ballinger, 1988. She has published articles in journals in her field such as International Security, the Bulletin of the Atomic Scientists, Arms Control Today and Science Magazine, and contributed chapters to many edited volumes on international security and foreign policy.

Duffy's chapters in jointly authored books with other scholars have sometimes been based on her lectures or speeches. For example, in 1993, she spoke at the Arab and Israeli-attended Ginosar Conference in Tel Aviv on possible application of treaty verification measures developed in East–West arms control to Middle East security agreements. This presentation was later published in the book, Confidence Building and Verification: Prospects in the Middle East, edited by Shai Feldman.

Beginning with a widely reprinted article about Zbigniew Brzezinski in the Washington Post in August 1976, "The Man Behind Carter's Foreign Policy," Duffy has written for many newspapers including the New York Times, the Los Angeles Times and the Chicago Tribune. She was a columnist for the "Christian Science Monitor" in 1980–82, and for Pacific News Service in the 1980s. She writes a regular column, Insight, for The Commonwealth magazine, as well as periodic op-ed pieces for the San Francisco Chronicle, San Jose Mercury News, on Medium and for other online and print publications.

She periodically writes, speaks, holds public forums and works with public officials on issues of protecting elders from financial and other abuse. She is working to establish more stringent local rules of court for probate in California counties that do not currently require attorneys to justify their fees as benefitting a protected person or their estate. The current laxity in rules is leading to significant financial abuse of protected people, their families and their estates. She is on the Attorney Fee Review Team for the Spectrum Institute, which is reviewing flaws and abuses in California's probate system, to make recommendations for reform to the governor and state legislature.

Duffy testified in 1987 before the House Committee on Foreign Affairs, on arms control treaty compliance, and in 1994 before the House Committee on Foreign Affairs, on the Nunn-Lugar Cooperative Threat Reduction Program.

Duffy speaks and writes about ethics, collaboration, consensus-based decision-making and cooperation. Her lectures on these topics include "Getting Things Done" at the Commonwealth Club, her 2017 speech at the Chautauqua Institution, and her sermon, "The Power of Civility" at Lafayette United Methodist Church

== Honors and awards ==
In addition to a Secretary of Defense Award for Outstanding Public Service and a Nunn-Lugar Trailblazer Award, Duffy is a recipient of:

−The Janet Gray Hayes Award, presented annually to an outstanding woman leader in honor of San Jose's first woman mayor;

−A Character Award from the Silicon Valley Monterey Bay Boy Scout Council

−A Woman of Achievement Award for Public Service from the San Jose Mercury News and the Women's Foundation

−A Human Relations Award from Santa Clara County

−A Good Neighbor Award from Miracle Messages

−She has been recognized over many years as a leader in business and management by the San Francisco Business Times, the Silicon Valley Business Journal and the Alameda County Commission on the Status of Women.

−In 2019, she was the San Francisco Business Times’ most admired non-profit CEO in the Bay Area.

−Duffy was the 2020 recipient of the Alumni Seal Award as Occidental College's Alum of the Year.

−Duffy received an honorary Doctor of Humane Letters from the University of San Francisco, in 2006.

-Duffy and her husband Rod Diridon were Grand Marshals of San Jose's Rose White and Blue Parade, on the 4th of July, 2022.

== Personal life and business activities ==
She was married to Rod Diridon, Sr., former chair of the Santa Clara County board of supervisors and a leader in transportation policy and the development of public transportation systems regionally, nationally and internationally, from 2001 till his death in 2026. The Amtrak and Caltrain Station in San Jose is named the Diridon Station, after Rod Diridon. They have two children and four grandchildren. Rod Diridon Jr. served two terms on the Santa Clara City Council, and is currently senior manager of state and local government affairs/West for Apple Inc.

In 2025, Duffy marks 60 years of responsibilities as an employee, owner and managing partner in her family's real estate business. From 1967 to 1974, she worked on the Dry Creek Ranch, a working cattle ranch, which her family owned, near Prineville in Crook County, Oregon. With her family, she has owned multi-family residential properties in California, Nevada and Wyoming. She has been a limited partner in a dozen non-family real estate projects.

In the mid-2000s, she was a partner in the McCloud Book Gallery, an independent bookstore and art gallery in Siskiyou County, California. The Book Gallery was founded to create business and employment in McCloud as an alternative to the proposed building of a large water-bottling plant that would have negatively impacted the streams and groundwater at the top of the CA watershed.

Duffy played competitive basketball in high school and tennis in high school and college; and swims, hikes, bicycles, skis, kayaks and practices yoga. She has summited Mount Shasta in California (14,179 ft) and Mount Chirripó in Costa Rica (12,533 ft).
