= Science and Technology Centre =

Science and Technology Centre (or Science and Technology Center) may refer to:

- Asia Pacific Network of Science and Technology Centres, Canberra, Australia
- Ghana Space Science and Technology Centre, Ghana
- Laser Science and Technology Centre, Delhi, India
- International Science and Technology Center, Moscow, Russia
- National Space Science and Technology Center, Huntsville, Alabama, United States
- Questacon – the National Science and Technology Centre, Canberra, Australia
- Science and Technology Center in Ukraine, Kiev, Ukraine
- Science and Technology Centre, Whiteknights Campus of Reading University
- United States Army Foreign Science and Technology Center, Charlottesville, Virginia, United States
