= Igor Yegorov =

Ukrainian economist

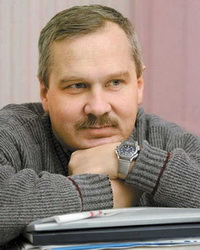
- Igor Yegorov
- Born: June 3, 1958 (age 68); Kyiv, Ukraine

Academic background
- Education: Taras Shevchenko National University of Kyiv
- Influences: Joseph Schumpeter; Christopher Freeman; Richard R. Nelson

Academic work
- Discipline: Innovation economics Science and technology studies Science policy Technology policy
- School or tradition: Innovation economics
- Institutions: National Academy of Sciences of Ukraine, The Institute for Economics and Forecasting
- Notable ideas: S&T potential studies
- Website: Information at IDEAS / RePEc

Igor Yegorov (born June 3, 1958) is a Ukrainian economist, Sc.D. in Economics, Deputy Director of the Institute for Economics and Forecasting of the National Academy of Sciences of Ukraine, and Professor at the Faculty of Economics at the Taras Shevchenko National University of Kyiv. Until 2013 he was the Head of Department for Systemic Studies of S&T Potential at G.M. Dobrov Center for Scientific and Technological Potential and Science History Studies of the NAS of Ukraine. He is a member of the Academic Council of Scientific and Technical Complex for Statistical Research of the State Statistics Service of Ukraine.

An editorial board member of the academic journals:

- Science and Science of Science (Ukraine),
- Economy and Forecasting (Ukraine),
- Problems of Science (Ukraine).

A member of the dissertation council of theses defense for the degree of Doctor of Science in:

- G.M. Dobrov Center for Scientific and Technological Potential and Science History Studies of National Academy of Sciences of Ukraine (Economics);
- Economic Research Institute of the Ministry of Economic Development and Trade of Ukraine (Economics).

== Grants ==
- Visiting Fulbright Scholar at the Center for International Science and Technology Policy, George Washington University (1995–1996). Project: Possibilities of Utilization of American Experience for Reforming Ukrainian Science.
- Visiting Scholar at the Kennan Institute of the Woodrow Wilson International Center for Scholars (2004). Project: Transformation of the R&D System in the U.S. and the Possibility of Application of American Experience in Ukraine.

== Expert and public activity ==
An expert of the European Commission project Enhance Innovation Strategies, Policies and Regulation in Ukraine.
An expert of the United Nations Economic Commission for Europe and the consultant (expert) of the UNESCO Institute for Statistics.
A member of the European Association for Evolutionary Political Economy and the European Association for the Study of Science and Technology.

== Academic contributions ==
Dr. Igor Yegorov developed the new scientific approach to the studies of S&T and innovation potentials in the processes of social and economic development. He proposed methodological principles, methods and simulation models for analysis of the current state and the perspectives of further development of the Ukrainian scientific and technological and innovation potentials. He made a review of the dynamics of the S&T potential, including calculations of corresponding indicators of cadres of the Ukrainian science. He has also identified key problems of the future R&D development in Ukraine, and the ways and instruments for their solving.

His research on S&T and economic policy has been published in Research Policy, Science and Public Policy and Europe-Asia Studies, as well as in variety of Ukrainian and Russian journals.

== Bibliography ==
=== Chapters ===
- Egorov, Igor (1996), 'Conversion of the Ukrainian military R&D at the beginning of the 1990s: some results and problems.' in Military R&D after the Cold War: Conversion and Technology Transfer in Eastern and Western Europe, Gummett P., Boutousov M., Farkas J., Rip A. (eds.), pp. 163–168.
- Egorov, Igor (1996), 'Technology Transfer in Ukraine: Slow Changes on the Background of Economic Decline.' in Barriers to International Technology Transfer, Kirkland J. (ed.), pp. 171–184.
- Egorov, Igor, Josephson, P. (1997), 'The Deceptive Promise of Reform: Ukrainian Science in Crisis.' Minerva 35 (4), pp. 321–347.
- Egorov, Igor (1998), 'Conversion in Ukraine: some results and problems.' Ch. 9 of The End of Military Fordism: Restructuring the Global Military Sector, edited by Mary Kaldor, pp. 196–215.
- Egorov, Igor (1999), 'Structural Changes in the Ukrainian Economy in Early 1990s and Their Influence on R&D Performance.' in Reconstruction or Destruction? Science and Technology at Stake in Transition Economies, Brundenius C., Goransson B., Reddy P. (eds.) pp. 48–69.
- Egorov, Igor (1999), 'Technological Transfer and Organisational Changes in Ukrainian Aviation and Belorussian Electronic Industries: Two Different Strategies.' in Technology Transfer: From Invention to Innovation, Inzelt A., Hilton J. (eds.), pp. 285–299.
- Yegorov, Igor (1999), 'Foreign Direct Investment in Ukraine: First Results, Tendencies and Prospects.' in FDI and Technology Transfer in the Former Soviet Union, Dyker D. (ed.), pp. 155–188.
- Egorov, Igor (2001), 'Future of the Scientific Systems in the Former Soviet Union.' Science, Technology, Society 10(23) (1), pp. 115–136.
- Egorov, Igor (2002), 'Transformation of the Ukrainian Economy in the Light of EU Enlargement and Development of Regional Co-operation' in Regiok Europaja, Bezsteri B., Levai I. (eds.), pp. 25–33.
- Egorov, Igor, Josephson, P. (2002), 'Ukraine's Declining Scientific Research Establishment.' Problems of Post-Communism 49 (4). pp. 43–51.
- Yegorov, Igor (2003), Industrial Restructuring in European Transition Economies: Regulatory Framework and the Role of Innovation, N.Y and Geneva: United Nations publication, ISBN 9211168678
- Yegorov, Igor (2004), 'Delayed restructuring through gradual global integration in aviation and space industry in Ukraine.', 'The ambivalent state and the use of alliances for growth and restructuring in the Ukrainian telecom industry.', 'Much fuss about nothing: restructuring stale mate in the Ukrainian car industry.', Ch. 9,11,13 of International Industrial Networks and Industrial Restructuring in Central and Eastern Europe, Radosevic S., Sadowski B. (eds.), pp. 155–166, 179–190, 207–222.
- Yegorov, Igor (2010), 'Ucrania: desarrollo económico inestable e integración en la Unión Europea.' in Unión Europea y agenda estratégica: una visión desde el centro y el este del continente, Alonso F., Andreff W., Luengo F. (eds.), pp. 169–192.

=== Selected academic articles ===
- Egorov, Igor (1995), "The transformation of R&D potential in Ukraine", Europe-Asia Studies, 47 (4): 651–668, doi:10.1080/09668139508412280.
- Egorov, Igor (1996), "Trends in Transforming R&D in Russia and Ukraine in Early 1990s", Science and Public Policy, 23 (4): 202–214.
- Egorov, Igor; Carayannis, Elias (1999), "Transforming the Post-Soviet Research Systems Through Incubating Technological Entrepreneurship", The Journal of Technology Transfer, 24 (2–3): 159–172, doi:10.1023/A:1007899204658, S2CID 33767426.
- Yegorov, Igor; Kubielas, Stanislaw (2002), "Strategic alliances and technology transfer in Central and Eastern Europe", Science and Public Policy, 27 (4): 265–273, archived from the original on 2012-04-04.
- Egorov, Igor (2002), "Perspectives on the Scientific Systems of the Post-Soviet States: A Pessimistic View", Prometheus: Critical Studies in Innovation, 20 (1): 59–73, doi:10.1080/08109020110110925, S2CID 155032977.
- Yegorov, Igor (2009), "Post-Soviet science: Difficulties in the transformation of the R&D systems in Russia and Ukraine", Research Policy, 38 (4): 600–609, doi:10.1016/j.respol.2009.01.010.
- Yegorov, Igor; Smallbone, David; Welter, Friederike; Voytovich, Artem (2010), "Government and entrepreneurship in transition economies: the case of small firms in business services in Ukraine", Service Industries Journal, 30 (5): 655–670, doi:10.1080/02642060802253876, S2CID 154117802.

== See also ==
- List of economists
- Evolutionary economics
- Innovation economics
