= Science and technology in Armenia =

Science and technology in Armenia describes trends and developments in science, technology and innovation policy and governance in Armenia.

== Recent history ==
Armenia experienced recession in 2009 due to the 2008 financial crisis, before returning to modest economic growth. Over the period 2008-2013, Armenia's economy grew by 1.7% per year, on average. Building an efficient research system was a state strategic objective for the Armenian authorities in 2014. Armenia has a number of assets, including a strong science base, a large Armenian diaspora and traditional national values that emphasize education and skills. Nonetheless, according to UNESCO in 2015, there were still hurdles to overcome in building the national innovation system. The biggest among these were the poor linkages between universities, research institutions and the business sector. This was partly a legacy of the country's Soviet past, when the policy focus was on developing linkages across the Soviet economy rather than within Armenia. Research institutes and industry were part of value chains within a large market that disintegrated with the Soviet Union. Two decades on, domestic businesses had yet to become effective sources of demand for innovation.

Armenia was ranked 59th in the Global Innovation Index in 2025. In June 2022, the Gituzh initiative was formed by around 200 founders and 18 associations to "prioritize" modernizing Armenia's science industries. The Gituzh initiative outlined an intent to push for an official state order by the government to support research and development, which at the time it lacked, with half of the 2021 allocated budget for defence R&D in 2021 used for unknown purposes.

== International cooperation ==
Armenia is a member of the Organization of the Black Sea Economic Cooperation (BSEC), along with Albania, Azerbaijan, Bulgaria, Georgia, Greece, Moldova, Romania, the Russian Federation, Serbia, Turkey and Ukraine. This organization was founded in 1992, shortly after the disintegration of the Union of Soviet Socialist Republics, in order to develop prosperity and security within the region. One of the BSEC's strategic goals is to deepen cooperation with the European Union. Armenia does not have an association agreement with the European Union (unlike Georgia, Moldova and Ukraine) but is nevertheless eligible to apply for research funding within the European Union's seven-year framework programs. The European Union has sought to enhance the involvement of countries from the region in these programs. In co-operation with the BSEC, the European Union’s Networking on Science and Technology in the Black Sea Region project (2009–2012) has been instrumental in funding a number of cross-border co-operative projects, notably in clean and environmentally sound technologies. BSEC's Third Action Plan on Science and Technology 2014–2018 acknowledges that considerable effort has been devoted to setting up a Black Sea Research Programme involving both BSEC and European Union members but also that, 'in a period of scarce public funding, the research projects the Project Development Fund could support will decrease and, as a result, its impact will be limited'.

Armenia hosts a branch of the International Science and Technology Center (ISTC). ISTC branches are also hosted by other parties to the agreement: Belarus, Georgia, Kazakhstan, Kyrgyzstan and Tajikistan. ISTIC was established in 1992 by the European Union, Japan, the Russian Federation and the USA to engage weapons scientists in civilian research projects and to foster technology transfer.

Armenia is also a member of the World Trade Organization, and has been since 5 February 2003.

Armenia has been a member of the Eurasian Economic Union since October 2014. This body was founded in May 2014 by Belarus, Kazakhstan and the Russian Federation. As co-operation among the member states in science and technology is already considerable, the Eurasian Economic Union is expected to have a limited impact on co-operation among public laboratories or academia but it may encourage research links among businesses and scientific mobility, since it includes provision for the free circulation of labour and unified patent regulations.

In June 2022, the Gituzh initiative was formed by around 200 founders and 18 associations to "prioritize" modernizing Armenia's science industries.

== Science governance ==
In Armenia, regulations governing ‘public good’ research have tended to be a step ahead of those related to the commercialization of research results. The first legislative act in relation to science and technology was the Law on Scientific and Technological Activity (2000). It defined key concepts related to the conduct of research and related organizations.

=== State Committee of Science ===
In 2007, the government made a key policy decision by adopting a resolution establishing the State Committee of Science (SCS). While being a committee within the Ministry of Education and Science, the SCS was empowered with wide-ranging responsibilities as the leading public agency for the governance of science, including the drafting of legislation, rules and regulations on the organization and funding of science. Shortly after the creation of the SCS, competitive project financing was introduced to complement basic funding of public research institutions; this funding has dropped over the years in relative terms. SCS is also the lead agency for the development and implementation of research programmes in Armenia.

=== Key policy documents ===
The State Committee of Science led the preparation of three key documents which were subsequently adopted by the government in 2010: the Strategy for the Development of Science 2011–2020, Science and Technology Development Priorities for 2010–2014 and the Strategic Action Plan for the Development of Science for 2011–2015. The Strategy for the Development of Science 2011–2020 envisages a competitive knowledge-based economy drawing on basic and applied research. The Action Plan seeks to translate this vision into operational programmes and instruments supporting research in the country. The Strategy for the Development of Science 2011–2020 envisions that ‘by 2020, Armenia is a country with a knowledge-based economy and is competitive within the European Research Area with its level of basic and applied research.’ The following targets have been formulated:

- Creation of a system capable of sustaining the development of science and technology;
- Development of scientific potential, modernization of scientific infrastructure;
- Promotion of basic and applied research;
- Creation of a synergistic system of education, science and innovation; and
- Becoming a prime location for scientific specialization in the European Research Area.

Based on this strategy, the Action Plan was approved by the government in June 2011. It defined the following targets:

- Improve the S&T management system and create the requisite conditions for sustainable development;
- Involve more young, talented people in education and research, while upgrading research infrastructure;
- Create the requisite conditions for the development of an integrated national innovation system; and
- Enhance international co-operation in research and development.

Research spending in Armenia and neighbouring countries, by sector of performance, 2005 and 2013. Source: UNESCO Science Report: towards 2030 (2015), Figure 12.5

Although the Strategy clearly pursues a ‘science push’ approach, with public research institutes as the key policy target, it nevertheless mentions the goals of generating innovation and establishing an innovation system. However, the business sector, which is the main driver of innovation, is not mentioned. Inbetween the Strategy and the Action Plan, the government issued a resolution in May 2010 on Science and Technology Development Priorities for 2010–2014. These priorities were:

- Armenian studies, humanities and social sciences;
- Life sciences;
- Renewable energy, new energy sources;
- Advanced technologies, information technologies;
- Space, Earth sciences, sustainable use of natural resources; and
- Basic research promoting essential applied research.

The Law on the National Academy of Sciences (May 2011) is also expected to play a key role in shaping the Armenian innovation system. It allows the academy to carry out wider business activities concerning the commercialization of research results and the creation of spin-offs; it also makes provision for restructuring the National Academy of Sciences by combining institutes involved in closely related research areas into a single body. Three of these new centres are particularly relevant: the Centre for Biotechnology, the Centre for Zoology and Hydro-ecology and the Centre for Organic and Pharmaceutical Chemistry.

In addition to horizontal innovation and science policies, the government strategy focuses support schemes on selected sectors of industrial policy. In this context, the State Committee of Science invites private sector participation on a co-financing basis in research projects targeting applied results. More than 20 projects have been funded in so-called targeted branches: pharmaceuticals, medicine and biotechnology, agricultural mechanization and machine building, electronics, engineering, chemistry and, particularly, the sphere of information technology.

=== Promotion of science-industry ties ===
GDP per capita and research expenditure as a share of GDP in Armenia and other countries, 2010–2013 (average). Source: UNESCO Science Report: towards 2030 (2015), Figure 12.4

Technologies like the MRI, the ATM, the color TV, the automatic transmission, and much more have been invented by Armenians. More recently, Armenia launched high-school level robotics curriculum.

Over the past decade, the government has made an effort to encourage science–industry linkages. The Armenian information technology sector has been particularly active: a number of public–private partnerships have been established between companies and universities, such as Synopsys Inc. and the Enterprise Incubator Foundation. Among Armenian-based software companies are Priotix, SFL, and Workfront. The multinational company Synopsys Inc. began working out of Armenia in October 2004, and in 2015 employed 650 people in the country. In 2004, Synopsys Inc. acquired LEDA Systems, which had established an Interdepartmental Chair on Microelectronic Circuits and Systems with the State Engineering University of Armenia. The chair, now part of the global Synopsys University Programme, supplies Armenia with microchip and electronic design automation specialists. Synopsys has since opened interdepartmental chairs at Yerevan State University and the Russian-Armenian University.

The Enterprise Incubator Foundation (EIF) was founded jointly in 2002 by the government and the World Bank and is connected with Armenia’s information technology (IT) sector, dealing with legal and business issues, educational reform, investment promotion and start-up funding, services and consultancy for IT companies, talent identification and workforce development. It has implemented various projects in Armenia with international companies such as Microsoft, Cisco Systems, Sun Microsystems, Hewlett Packard and Intel. One such project is the Microsoft Innovation Center, which offers training, resources and infrastructure. In parallel, the Science and Technology Entrepreneurship Programme helps technical specialists bring products to market and create new ventures, as well as encouraging partnerships with established companies. Each year, EIF organizes the Business Partnership Grant Competition and Venture Conference. EIF also runs technology entrepreneurship workshops.

== Financial investment in research ==
Research spending in Armenia and neighbouring countries as a percentage of GDP, 2001–2013. Source: UNESCO Science Report: towards 2030 (2015), Figure 12.3

Gross domestic expenditure on research and development is low in Armenia, averaging 0.25% of GDP over 2010–2013, with little annual variation observed in recent years. This is only around one-third of the ratios observed in Belarus and Ukraine. However, the statistical record of research expenditure is incomplete in Armenia, as expenditure in the privately owned business enterprises is not surveyed. With this proviso, one can affirm that the share of research funding from the state budget has increased since the 2008 financial crisis and accounted for around two-thirds (66.3%) of domestic spending on research in 2013.

Armenia’s research intensity accounted for just 0.19% of GDP in 2018. This ratio has remained stable for the past few years, even though, in absolute terms, research expenditure was 20% higher (AMD 14.3 billion, or ca US$ 29.9 million) in 2018 than in 2014.

== Scientists and education ==
=== Research ===
Researchers in Armenia and neighbouring countries, 2001-2013. Source: UNESCO Science Report: towards 2030 (2015), Figure 12.2

The number of researchers (in head counts) in the public sector has dropped by 27% since 2008, to 3,870 (2013), a casualty of the 2008 financial crisis. Female researchers accounted for 48.1% of the total in 2013. Like other former Soviet states, Armenia has long since achieved gender parity in science and engineering. Women are underrepresented in engineering and technology (33.5%) but prevalent in medical and health sciences (61.7%) and agriculture (66.7%).

The number of researchers per million inhabitants (in head counts) peaked at 1,867 in 2009 before receding to 1,300 in 2013, a lower level than over the period from 2001 to 2006. The number of researchers may be underestimated, as many Armenian researchers have secondary jobs in research.

=== Higher education ===
Armenia has a well-established system of higher education. In 2015, it encompassed 22 state universities, 37 private universities, four universities established under intergovernmental agreements and nine branches of foreign universities. Universities in Armenia have a high degree of autonomy in formulating curricula and setting tuition fees.

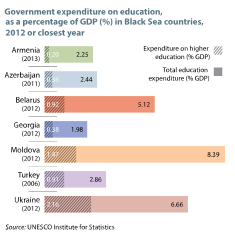
Government expenditure on education as a percentage of GDP in Armenia and neighbouring countries, 2012 or closest year. Source: UNESCO Science Report: towards 2030 (2015), Figure 12.1, data from UNESCO Institute for Statistics

The Armenian government devoted a small share of GDP to higher education in 2013: 0.20%. This is much lower than the share allocated to higher education by Moldova (1.47%) and Ukraine (2.16%). Armenia's public education expenditure overall is also lower than that of most of its neighbours: 2.25% of GDP in 2013 (see figure).

Armenia joined the Bologna Process in 2005. Within this process, universities have been working to align the standards and quality of their qualifications. With only a few exceptions, universities tend to focus almost exclusively on teaching and do not engage in, or encourage, research by staff.

Armenia ranks 60th out of 122 countries for education – lagging somewhat behind Belarus and Ukraine but ahead of Azerbaijan and Georgia Armenia ranks better for tertiary enrollment (44th out of 122 countries), with 25% of the workforce possessing tertiary education (see table below).Women make up one-third of PhD graduates (see table below). Armenia performs poorly, though, in the workforce and employment index (113th out of 122 countries), primarily due to high unemployment and low levels of employee training.

==== Table: Higher education in Armenia, 2009-2012 ====
Other countries are given for comparison

	Workforce with tertiary education		Tertiary enrolment rate		PhD or equivalent graduates, 2012 or closest year							
	Highest score 2009–2012 (%)	Change over five years (%)	Highest score 2009–2012 (% of age cohort)	Percentage point change over five years	Total	Women (%)	Natural sciences	Women (%)	Engineering	Women (%)	Health and welfare	Women (%)
Armenia	25	2.5	51	1.7	614^{−2}	36^{−2}	111^{−2}	23^{−2}	59^{−2}	10^{−2}	29^{−2}	17^{−2}
Azerbaijan	16	-6.0	20	1.1	406	31	100	27	45	13	23	39
Belarus	24	–	92	21.3	1 216	53	186	51	215	24	188	50
Georgia	31	-0.3	30	-8.9	270	64	37	57	55	53	5	100
Moldova	25	5.0	40	-1.1	405	60	–	–	–	–	–	–
Turkey	18	4.4	69	30.9	4 506	47	1 022	50	628	34	515	72
Ukraine	36	5.0	80	4.3	9 248	56	1 241	49	1 613	34	482	52

-n = refers to n years before reference year

Source: UNESCO Science Report: towards 2030 (2015), Table 12.2, data from UNESCO Institute for Statistics

=== Science institutions ===
Among the main research and development institutions in the country, are:

- Armenian National Academy of Sciences - (2011) has been authorized to develop business activities, setting up an Applied Projects Department in 2017 to help its 35 affiliated research institutes and centres promote technology transfer and the commercialization of research outcomes, with some of that research related to environmental research and climate change. The National Academy of Sciences in 2021 was currently the country’s main performer of research, withademy’s International Scientific and Educational Centre conducting a range of graduate and postdoctoral practical training courses in tandem with the Academy’s own affiliated institutes and centres.
  - Institute for Informatics and Automation Problems
  - Mikael Ter-Mikaelian Institute for Physical Research
  - Institute of Mathematics of National Academy of Sciences of Armenia
- Armenian National Agrarian University
- National University of Architecture and Construction of Armenia
- National Polytechnic University of Armenia
- National Academy of Sciences of Western Armenia
- National Foundation of Science and Advanced Technologies
- Yerevan Computer Research and Development Institute
- Yerevan Physics Institute

Between 2010, and 2019, there were a number of programs and initiatives instigated in Armenia. Established in 2010, the Targeted Projects Programme innovated in 2018 by issuing a call restricted to research projects that involve both research institutes and industrial partners, whereby the latter are obliged to contribute at least 15% of project funding.

Since 2013, the government has supported several so-called ‘system-forming’ projects. One such project is the Centre for the Advancement of Natural Discoveries using Light Emission (CANDLE) in Yerevan. CANDLE is a third-generation synchrotron light source for basic and applied research which also provides services to industry. Established in 2016, the Foundation of Armenian Science and Technology is a private initiative. The foundation runs programs supporting young talent, entrepreneurs and technological start-ups primarily specializing in data and computer science, biotechnology and advanced materials.

== Scientific output ==
Scientific publications per million inhabitants in the Black Sea countries, 2005–2014. Source: UNESCO Science Report: towards 2030 (2015), Figure 12.5, data from Thomson Reuters' Web of Science, Science Citation Index Expanded

In 2014, Armenia had 232 scientific publications per million inhabitants catalogued in international journals, according to Thomson Reuters' Web of Science (Science Citation Index Expanded). This is more than the world average of 176 per million inhabitants. The number of scientific publications recorded in this database by Armenian scientists grew from 381 to 691 between 2005 and 2014. With a citation rate of 0.92 for their published articles between 2008 and 2012, Armenian scientists came close to the OECD average for this indicator: 1.08. Six out of ten (60%) Armenian articles had one or more foreign co-authors in 2014, twice the OECD average of 29% but similar to the ratio for Belarus (58%) and less than that for either Georgia (72%) or Moldova (71%).

Like the other post-Soviet states, Armenia specializes in physics. As in Moldova and Ukraine, Armenian scientists collaborate most with their German peers but the Russian Federation also figures among Armenia's four closest collaborators in science and engineering.

The value of Armenia's high-tech merchandise exports increased between 2008 and 2013 (see table). Between 2001 and 2010, Armenians submitted 14 patent applications to the European Patent Office and 37 to the US Patent and Trademark Office.

=== Table: Armenia's high-tech merchandise exports, 2008 and 2013 ===
Trends in scientific publishing in Armenia and neighbouring countries, 2005–2014

Other countries are given for comparison

	Total in millions of US$*		Per capita in US$	
	2008	2013	2008	2013
Armenia	7	9	2.3	3.1
Azerbaijan	6	42^{−1}	0.7	4.4 ^{−1}
Belarus	422	769	44.1	82.2
Georgia	21	23	4.7	5.3
Moldova	13	17	3.6	4.8
Turkey	1 900	2 610	27.0	34.8
Ukraine	1 554	2 232	33.5	49.3
Brazil	10 823	9 022	56.4	45.0
Russian Federation	5 208	9 103	36.2	63.7
Tunisia	683	798	65.7	72.6

-n = refers to n years before reference year

Source: UNESCO Science Report: towards 2030 (2015), Table 12.2, data from UNESCO Institute for Statistics

== See also ==
- ArmCosmos
- Economy of Armenia
- Education in Armenia
- List of science and technology articles by continent
- National Foundation of Science and Advanced Technologies
