= Janne E. Nolan =

American academic and foreign policy advisor (1951–2019)

- Born: Janne Emilie Nolan; December 28, 1951; Neuilly-sur-Seine, France
- Died: June 26, 2019 (aged 67); Washington, D.C., U.S.
- Occupations: Academic, foreign policy advisor
- Years active: Cold War; Post–Cold War era
- Known for: International Affairs, Arms Control, Nuclear Nonproliferation
- Title: Chair
- Board member of: Nuclear Security Working Group
- Children: 1

Academic background
- Education: Antioch College (BA); Fletcher School of International Law and Diplomacy, Tufts University (MA), (PhD)

Academic work
- Discipline: International Studies
- Sub-discipline: Arms Control
- Institutions: Brookings Institution, Georgetown University, Department of State, Century Foundation, Columbia University
- Notable works: Guardians of the Arsenal: The Politics of Nuclear Strategy; Trappings of Power: Ballistic Missiles in the Third World; An Elusive Consensus: Nuclear Weapons and American Security after the Cold War; Tyranny of Consensus: Discourse and Dissent in American National Security
- Influenced: Condoleezza Rice, Kori Schake, Michael E. O'Hanlon, Francis Gavin

Janne E. Nolan (28 December 1951 – 26 June 2019) was an American academic, foreign policy advisor, and expert on nuclear arms control and nonproliferation. She held senior positions in the Department of State, as a staffer for the Senate, and served on multiple blue ribbon commissions. She was well known for supporting generations of women in the traditionally male dominated field of nuclear security.

== Early life and education ==
Janne Emilie Nolan was born on 28 December 1951 to James and Margaret "Maggie" Claughton Nolan, both American citizens, in Neuilly-sur-Seine, France. Her parents divorced when she was four. Nolan's mother moved her and her sister to London three years after the divorce, before settling in the United States when Janne was 12.

=== Education ===
Nolan attended Antioch College where she majored in political science and foreign languages, and earned a BA degree in 1974. She earned her (MA) in Law and Diplomacy from the Fletcher School of Law and Diplomacy at Tufts University where she also went on to attain her PhD. Her doctoral dissertation focused on the military industries in Taiwan and South Korea. From 1980 to 1982, Nolan was a Doctoral Research Fellow at the Stanford University Center for International Security and Cooperation. Nolan was one of only four women—along with Cindy Roberts, 'Condi' Rice, and Gloria Duffy—with CICAS fellowships at the time. Aware of their position as the only women in the program, they took to calling themselves "the fellowettes".

== Legacy ==
The Henry A. Kissinger Center for Global Affairs at the Johns Hopkins School of Advanced International Studies named a writing contest on international security in her honor. And the Council on Strategic Risk's Janne E. Nolan Center on Strategic Weapons is named in honor of her work and help in founding the organization.

== Publications ==
=== Books ===
- Tyranny of Consensus: Discourse and Dissent in American National Security Policy (Washington, D.C.: Brookings Institution Press, 2014)
- Security and Intelligence in the Age of Diplomacy (Washington, D.C.: Georgetown University Press, 2009)
- An Elusive Consensus: Nuclear Weapons and American Politics After the Cold War (Washington, D.C.: Brookings Institution Press, 1999)
- Global Engagement: Security and Cooperation in the 21st Century, ed (Washington, D.C.: Brookings Institution Press, 1991)
- Trappings of Power: Ballistic Missiles in the Third World (Washington, D.C.: Brookings Institution Press, 1991)
- Guardians of the Arsenal: The Politics of Nuclear Strategy (New York, New York: Basic Books, 1989)
- Military Industry in Taiwan and South Korea (London: Macmillan, 1986)

=== Co-authored books ===
- Discourse, Dissent and Strategic Surprise: Formulating U.S. Security in an Age of Uncertainty co-authored with Douglas MacEachin, (Washington, D.C.: Georgetown University Press, 2006)
- Ultimate Security: Weapons of Mass Destruction in the 21st Century co-editor with Bernard Finel and Brian Finlay, (Washington, D.C.: Brookings Institution Press, 2003).

=== Book chapters ===
- "U.S. Policy, Politics and Organizational Issues in International Space Cooperation," in partners in space (Washington, D.C.: NASA, 2003)
- "The Perils of Nuclear, Biological, and Chemical Weapons" with Bernard Finel and Brian Finlay, in Michael Brown, ed. Grave New World: Security Challenges in the 21st Century (Washington, D.C.: Georgetown University Press, 2003)
- "American Policy in Northeast Asia: An Emerging Bush Legacy" in Robert M. Hathaway and Wilson Lee George W. Bush and Asia: A Mid-Term Assessment (Washington, D.C.: Center for Strategic and International Studies, 2002)
- "Foreign Policy Presentation: Oil and Globalization" in Lincoln P. Bloomfield Global Markets and National Interests: The New Geopolitics of Energy, Capital, and Information (Washington, D.C.: Center for Strategic and International Studies, 2002)
- "U.S. Arms Policy in an Insecure World" with William Keller, in Ellen Frost and Harlan Ullman, eds. The Global Century (Washington, D.C.: National Defense University, 2002)
- "The Next Nuclear Policy Review" in Harold Feiveson, Ed. Deep Cuts in Nuclear Forces (Washington, D.C. and New York, New York: Aspen Strategy Group, 1998)
- "The Proliferation Threat of Weapons of Mass Destruction and U.S. Security Interests" in Aspen Strategy Group Global Proliferation (Washington D.C. and New York New York: Aspen Strategy Group, 1998)
- "Nuclear Weapons: Is There a Clinton Legacy?" in Kenneth W. Thompson, Ed. Presidents and Arms Control (University Press of America, 1997)

== See also ==
- Brookings Institution
- CRDF Global
