= Diridon =

Diridon could refer to:

- Rod Diridon Sr. (1939–2026), American politician
- San Jose Diridon station, a train station in San Jose, California, U.S., named after Rod Diridon Sr.
