= Guadalupe River =

Guadalupe River may refer to:

== United States ==
- Guadalupe River (California), a tributary of the San Francisco Bay
- Guadalupe River (Texas), a tributary of the San Antonio Bay of the Gulf of Mexico
- Guadalupe River Park, a city park in San Jose, California
- Guadalupe River State Park, a Texas state park located along a section of the Guadalupe River in Kendall and Comal counties
- Rio Guadalupe (New Mexico), a tributary of the Jemez River

== Other ==
- Guadalupe (Spain), a tributary of the Guadiana in southern Spain

== See also ==
- Guadalope River, a tributary of the Ebro River in northern Spain
