= Caroline S. Wagner =

American academic (1955–2026)

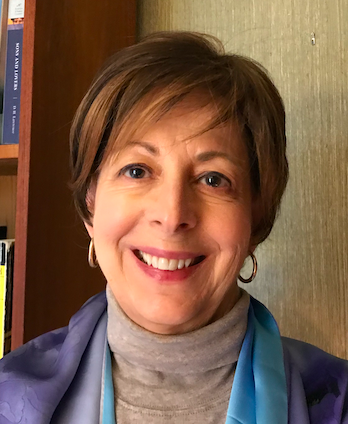
- Born: 1955; Newport, Rhode Island, United States
- Died: June 24, 2026 (aged 70–71)
- Education: Trinity Washington University; George Washington University; University of Amsterdam
- Known for: Specializing in public policy related to science
- Scientific career
- Fields: Science Policy

Caroline S. Wagner (1955 – June 24, 2026) was an American academic and author specializing in public policy related to science, technology, and innovation. She was a professor at The Ohio State University, Columbus, Ohio. From 2011 until 2021, Wagner held the endowed chair in international affairs named for Milton A. Wolf and Roslyn Z. Wolf at the John Glenn College of Public Affairs, The Ohio State University, Columbus, Ohio.

== Education ==
Wagner earned her doctorate from the University of Amsterdam School of Communications Studies (ASCoR) in Science and Technology Dynamics, under Dutch sociologist Loet Leydesdorff; a Master of Arts degree in Science, Technology and Public Policy from George Washington University; and a Bachelor of Arts from Trinity College, Washington, DC.

== Career ==
In 2018, Wagner authored a book, The Collaborative Era in Science: Governing the Network, by Palgrave Publishers.

This work follows an earlier book, The New Invisible College: Science for Development, Brookings Press, 2008.

Other work has pointed out that international collaboration acts as a global network, operating beyond the nation-state. The global network creates a conundrum for national governments because research is taking place at so many more places across the globe than was the case in the late 20th century. Governments seek to scan and reintegrate knowledge in addition to investing in national or regional science and technology. National planners need to increase awareness of the international system of science and technology. However, recent efforts to secure national research and protect research from being exploited for nefarious purposes is threatening the global system.

At The RAND Corporation from 1993 until 2005, Wagner was deputy to the director of the Science and Technology Policy Institute. She has served on the staff of the US Congress, the Office of Technology Assessment, and the US Department of State. She was an advisor to the World Bank’s Knowledge Report and other projects, United Nations Millennium Development Project, the Organization for Economic Cooperation and Development, and several governments. An Elected Fellow of the American Association for the Advancement of Science and was an officer for Section X; she also served as an editor of the refereed journal Science & Public Policy published by Oxford University Press. Wagner received a Rockefeller Foundation grant to write The New Invisible College: Science for Development published by Brookings Institution Press in 2008. In 2010, she served as an Associate Professor at Penn State University's School of International Affairs, but moved to Ohio State for a position in the John Glenn College of Public Affairs. In 2015, Wagner was elected to the Council on Foreign Relations. She serves on the Board of Advisors for CRDF Global. Wagner was a Fulbright Foundation distinguished visitor to Israel in 2006.

She died of pancreatic cancer on June 24, 2026.
