= National Foundation of Science and Advanced Technologies =

National Foundation of Science and Advanced Technologies logo

The National Foundation of Science and Advanced Technologies (NFSAT) (Armenian: Գիտության և առաջադեմ տեխնոլոգիաների ազգային հիմնադրամ, romanized: Gitut’yan yev arrajadem tekhnologianeri azgayin himnadram) is an Armenian non-profit, voluntary organization established in 1997 by legislation. Its mission is to develop the scientific and engineering potential of Armenia. The headquarters of the federation is located in Yerevan.

== Objectives ==
NFSAT's mission is to promote scientific research and technological development in various fields within conformity with international standards, as well as to provide financial and technological support for scientific research and project development. The foundation has several grants which are available for Armenian scientists and engineers.

== See also ==
- Science and technology in Armenia
