= Karen Khachatrian =

Armenian writer and scientist (born 1962)

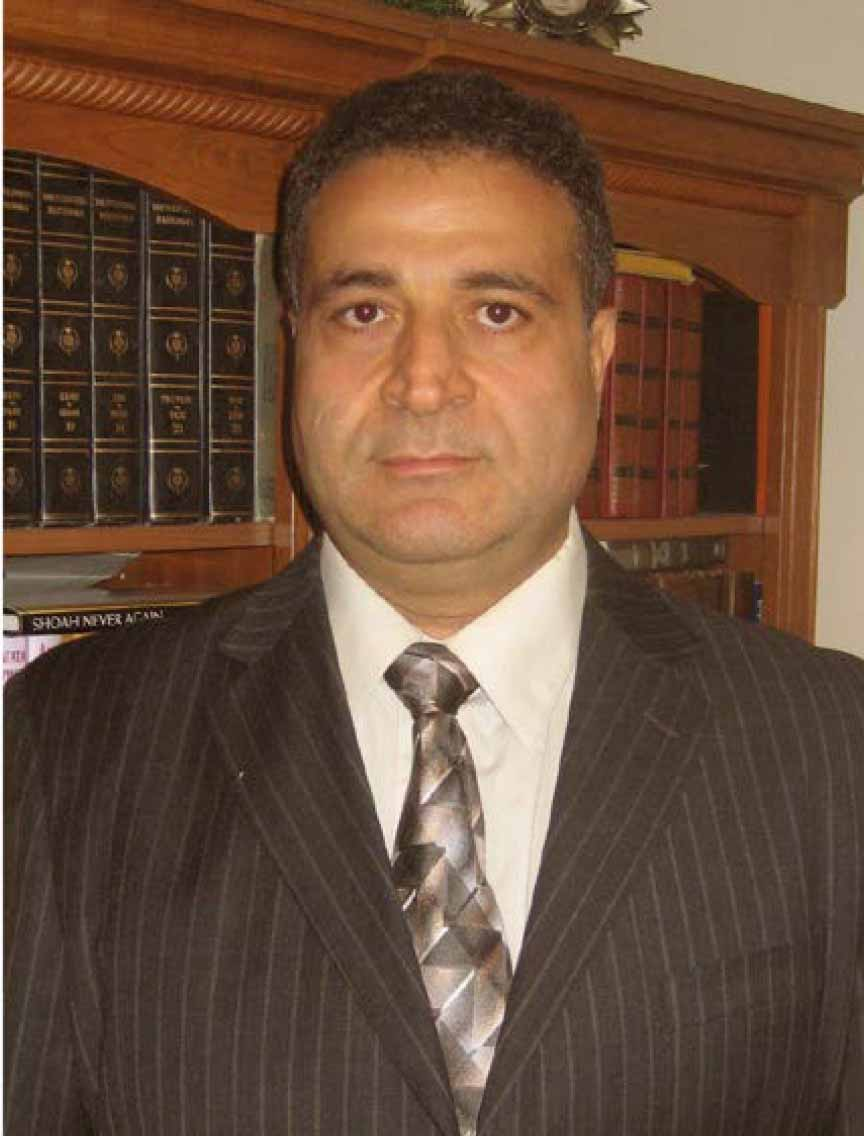

Karen Khachatrian (Armenian: Կարեն Խաչատրյան) also known with his literary name Khachkar (in Armenian Խաչկար) is an Armenian writer and scientist.

Khachatrian was born on November 10, 1962, in Yerevan. In 1984, he graduated from Yerevan Polytechnic Institute with a diploma of mining engineer-constructor. worked in the mines of Megradzor as a shift and site supervisor. As an engineer-researcher, worked at the Georgian Research Institute of Hydraulic Structures.

In 1988 he proceeded the post-graduate studies at the Moscow Mining Institute (Moscow State Mining University), defended his dissertation and obtained Ph.D degree. From that year on, K. Khachatrian is teaching at the National Polytechnic University of Armenia in its "Mining Engineering Department". In 1991 he was awarded the rank of associate professor.

Khachatrian emigrated to the US in 1992. Until 2005 he worked in establishment "PHOTORUN", where he was the general manager and supervisor of the company. From 2006 to the present day, he is a civil servant and is working at the Los Angeles County Department of Public Works as a specialist in geographic information systems (GIS)

Khachatrian continued his studies in different educational institutions of the US: at California State University of Fresno (Cal State Fresno), Cal State University of Northridge (CSUN), California State Polytechnic University of Pomona (CalPoly Pomona). In 2003, he obtained a PhD in Mining Engineering and in 2009, a master's degree in Civil Engineering, (MSCE), and in 2016 a Master in Public Administration (MPA).

In 2015 Khachatrian was elected a Member of the Russian Academy of Natural Sciences, He was elected a vice president and scientific secretary of the USA Scientific Center of the Russian Academy of Natural Sciences (RANS). He was the founding chief editor of RANS Periodical Znatok, until end of 2018.

Since 2015 he was a founding member, vice-president and scientific secretary of the former National Academy of Sciences of Western Armenia (currently Armenian National American Academy of Sciences after Woodrow Wilson /ANAAS/), founding chief editor of its magazine Gitak (2015-2019).

He was the designer of all the awards, and symbols of the mentioned two organizations: (“Vladimir Vernadsky” medal, “Peter the Great” order, of RANS, and “Woodrow Wilson” gold medal of ANAAS, also award papers, seals and stamps). From the end of the 2018, Karen Khachatrian stepped down from the administrative positions of the mentioned two organizations.

Khachatrian (literary name Khachkar) is a member of the Writers' Association of Armenia, member of the Journalists' Association of Armenia, member of the International Federation of Journalists, Executive Vice-Chairman of the Armenian Writers Association of the United States of America. He has written over hundred poems, mystery novels and short stories, historical novels and dozens of essays and articles, theatrical plays, which are included in 24 published books, both separately and in the form of five and two volumes. Ten volumes of works have been submitted for publication.

Karen Khachatrian was awardedː The "Panegyric Parchment" Joint award of the Union of Writers of Armenia (WUA) and of the Armenian Writers and Journalists Association of the USA (AWJA USA). The Gold Medal of “Vladimir Vernadsky”, the Russian Academy of Natural Sciences, The Gold Medal of the “Woodrow Wilson” National Academy of Sciences of Western Armenia, The Gold Medal " Vernatoun" of the Armenian Writers Association of the USA (hy:Ամերիկայի Միացյալ Նահանգների հայ գրողների և լրագրողների միություն), The Order of "The Knight in Science and Culture", the Russian Academy of Natural Sciences, The Order of "Peter the Great", the USA branch of the Russian Academy of Natural Sciences, The Medal of "Ivan Bunin", the Russian Academy of Natural Sciences, The Order “Star of Honor”, the Russian Academy of Natural Sciences, The Gold Medal of the Ministry of Culture of Armenia, The Medal “Mayrenii Despan” of the Ministry of Diaspora of Armenia, The Medal “For Literary Merit” of the Writers Union of Armenia. "Benefactor of the Armenian National Culture" award of the Armenian Writers Association of the USA (AWJA USA)

Also: Certificate of Recognition of the House of Representatives of the USA /Signed by Congressman Adam B. Shiff/, Certificate of Recognition of the California State Senate /signed by State senator Anthony Portantino/, Certificate of Recognition of California Legislature Assembly /signed by Assembly member Laura Friedman/, Mayor's Commendation of the City of Glendale /signed by Mayor Vardan Gharpetian/, Certificate of Recognition from the Consulate General of the Republic of Armenia in Los Angeles /signed by Consul General Sergey Sarkisov/, Appreciation Epistle from the Western Diocese of the Armenian Church / signed by Primate Archbishop Hovnan Derderian/.

== Scientific Works ==
- Khachatrian G. A., Khachatrian K. G. Correlation of parameters of hardness, roughness and abrasiveness of rocks of some deposits of Transcaucasia. - In the book : Physical properties under different thermodynamic conditions and mountain-geological characteristics of the mountains of Armenia . (In Russian)
- Khachatrian K. G. Contour blasting is the key to reducing rock overburden during the passage of mining operations. In the book. Materials of reports of the first republic. Science Conf. Аспирантов ВУЗов Арм. USSR (November 26–28, 1985). Yerevan: ed. ErGU, 1986, p. 61-62. (In Russian)
- Popov V. L., Khachatrian K. G. Increasing the stability of products based on the application of the method of contour blasting. On Sat. : Research problems of mechanics of underground structures. Tula: TulPI, 1987, p. 127-132. (In Russian)
- Popov V. L., Khachatrian K. G. Dependence of breed selection on parameters and construction of charges. - On Sat. : Construction of underground structures in the conditions of urban development. - M. MGI, 1987, p. 96-101. (In Russian)
- Khachatrian K. G. Model of interaction of contour blasting parameters and finishing technology. Information sheet АрмНИИНТИ, 5206, Горное дело, Yerevan, 1987, 3с. (In Russian)
- Khachatrian K. G. Influence of blasting methods on strength and stability of production. (In Russian)
- Information sheet АрмНИИНТИ, 5207, Горное дело, Yerevan, 1987, 4 с. (In Russian)
- Khachatrian K. G., Khachatrian S. M. About Cartography Problems Related to Geographical Information Systems, West. Armenian: Science: Nation: Academy. para. No. 3, 2016, p. 30-34. (In Armenian)
- Khachatrian K. G., Khachatrian S. M. Geo-connectivity in Geographical Information Systems, West. Armenian: Science: Nation: Academy. para. No. 4, 2016, pp. 19–24. (In Armenian)
- Khachatrian K. G. About Geographical Information Systems and their application in everyday life. Науч.-Периодич. Journal "Znatok" Ros. Academ. nature Science, № 2, RAEN - Amer. Science Center, Los Angeles, 2017, p. 4-10: (In Russian)

== Literary Works (in Armenian) ==
1. Khachkar "Collection of Poems", Yerevan Printing, LA, 2013, 172 pages,
2. Khachkar "Historical Novels", Yerevan Printing, L A, 2014, 708 pages,
3. Khachkar "Literary in Prose", Yerevan Printing, Los Angeles, 2014, 464 pages,
4. Khachkar "Collection of Essays, Vol I" , Yerevan Printing, Los Angeles, 2014, 364 pages,
5. Khachkar "The End of the Last Monarch", Play, Yerevan Printing, Los Angeles, 2016, 142 pages
6. Khachkar "The Modulations of Life", Collection of Short Stories, Yerevan Printing, Los Angeles, 2016, 90 pages,
7. Khachkar "Mystery Novels", Yerevan Printing, Los Angeles, 2017, 242 pages,
8. Khachkar "The Janissary" Historical Novel, Yerevan Printing, Los Angeles, 2017, 372 pages,
9. Khachkar "The Unexpected Turns of Life", Historical Novel, Yerevan Printing, Los Angeles, 2017, 108 pages,
10. Khachkar "In the Bloody Alleys of Black Gardens", Historical Novel, Yerevan Printing, Los Angeles, 2017, 376 pages,
11. Khachkar "The Behavior of Vahans’ ", Historical Novel, 232 pages, Yerevan Printing, Los Angeles, 2017, 232 pages,
12. Khachkar "Articles, Publications, Interviews, Translations, Vol I",, Yerevan Printing, Los Angeles, 2017, 248 pages
13. Khachkar "Collection of Essays, Vol II", Yerevan Printing, Los Angeles, 2017, 100 pages,
14. Khachkar "Янычар", Historical Novel, Yerevan Printing, Los Angeles, 2018, 354 pages, /Russian translation/
15. Khachkar "Articles, Publications, Interviews, Translations, Vol II", Yerevan Printing, Los Angeles, 2018, 124 pages,
16. Khachkar "Collection of Literary Works, Vol. I",, Armav Publishing House, Yerevan, 2022, 426 pages,
17. Khachkar "Collection of Literary Works, Vol. II", Armav Publishing House, Yerevan, 2022, 452 pages,
18. Khachkar "Collection of Literary Works, Vol. III", Armav Publishing House, Yerevan, 2022, 337 pages
19. Khachkar "Collection of Literary Works, Vol. IV", Armav Publishing House, Yerevan, 2022, 376 pages,
20. Khachkar "Collection of Literary Works, Vol. V", 370 pages, Armav Publishing House, Yerevan, 2022, 370 pages
21. Khachkar "Collection of Reviews Vol I", Armav Publishing House, Yerevan, 2022, 224 pages,
22. Khachkar "Collection of Reviews Vol II", Armav Publishing House, Yerevan, 2022, 236 pages,
23. Khachkar "There Was No Room for Everyone in Noah's Ark", Novel, ALCO Publishing House, Los Angeles, 2023, 338 pages,
24. Khachkar "The History of a Thesis or From the Angegh Dynasty to the English Empire", Feuilleton-Novel, ALCO Publishing House, Los Angeles, 2023, 318 pages,
