= NASU Institute for Economics and Forecasting =

Ukrainian research institute

Coordinates: 50.4344°N 30.5378°E

Institute for Economics and Forecasting, National Academy of Sciences of Ukraine
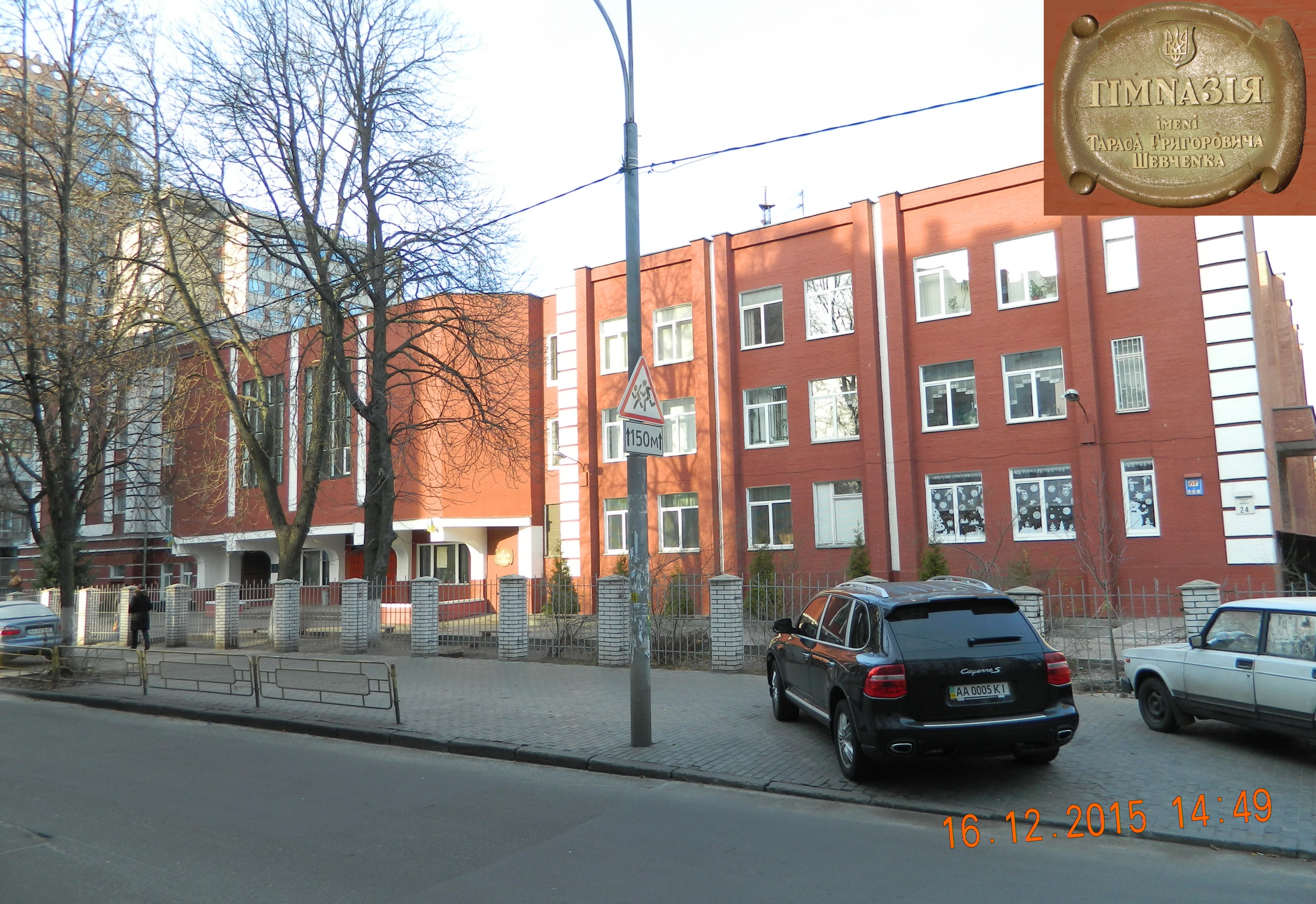
- Established: 1997
- Type: Public Institution
- Location: 26 Panasa Myrnoho St., Kyiv 01011, Ukraine
- Key people: Valery Heyets (Director), Igor Yegorov (Deputy Director), Anatoliy Danylenko (Deputy Director), Andriy Hrytsenko (Deputy Director)
- Parent organization: National Academy of Sciences of Ukraine
- Website: http://www.ief.org.ua

The Institute for Economics and Forecasting of the National Academy of Sciences of Ukraine, formerly the Institute for Economic Forecasting is a public institution for research in economics and forecasting. The institute was established by the decree of the Cabinet of Ministers of Ukraine (July 1997, N 772) and the decree of the Presidium of NAS of Ukraine (September 1997, N 298) with the purpose of ensuring the elaboration of strategic forecasts and programs of socio-economic development of Ukraine.

The institute has fifteen research departments. The institute has 203 researchers including 50 Doctors of sciences and 109 Candidates of Sciences including an Academician of Ukrainian National Academy of Sciences, 5 Corresponding Members of the Ukrainian National Academy of Sciences, And 7 members of Ukrainian sectoral academies of sciences.

The main scientific activity areas of the Institute:

- economic theory;
- modeling of economic development;
- economic growth, restructuring and industrial policy;
- financial and monetary regulation;
- financial and budget forecasting;
- researching the development of and regulation of financial markets;
- technological forecasting and innovative policy;
- modeling and short-time forecasting;
- sectoral forecasting and market conjuncture;
- economics management;
- economics and policy of agrarian transformations;
- forma and methods of economic management in the agro-industrial complex;
- monitoring-based research on socio-economic transformations of the Ukrainian society;
- socio-economic problems of labor;
- economic history.

== Academic Board ==
The Academic Board is a collegial advisory body that manages scientific research and administrative activity of this academic institution. The Academic Board makes the rulings and develops policies as established by the institute's Charter. The Director of the institute is the President of the Academic Board, the deputy director for Science and Research is its vice president, the Academic Secretary of the institute is the Secretary of the Academic Board. The number of members of the Academic Board is not less than 25 people.

The institute's Academic Board discusses the main areas of academic and organizational activities of the Institute and recommends them for the approval by the Section of Economics and Presidium of NAS of Ukraine. Among these areas are the following:

- optimization of the institute's structure; coordination and scientific cooperation with other academic institutions of Ukraine; organization of academic meetings and conferences; international scientific cooperation of the institute; publishing of scientific works; promotion of outstanding scientific works, discoveries and inventions for academic prizes and awards, including the international ones; putting forward and discussing the candidacies for the position of the institute's Director; election of the scholars to various academic positions through academic contests; initiation of the procedures of awarding academic degrees and honorary academic degrees to the institute's scholars; promotion of the scholars to the positions of Members and Fellows (also called Full Members or Academicians) of NAS of Ukraine;
- analysis of the status and results of scientific research, of its logistic and financial support, of the training of researches and scholars;
- adoption of the programs and projects of scientific research; of the annual reports on academic and administrative activities of the institute;
- approval of the results of the attestation of the institute's scholars’ expertise; approval of the topics of dissertations and papers of the doctoral candidates and post-graduate researchers, of their academic supervisors (advisers); recommendation of the candidates for the promotion to the positions of the deputy director for Science and Research, Academic Secretary of the institute, Editors-in-Chief and members of editorial boards of the institute's academic periodicals.

== Publications ==
During ten years, the institute has published about 60 monographs and over 20 research papers.

Research on the economic reforms implemented in Ukraine during ten years (1990–2000), justification of strategies and policy of Ukraine's economic development for a long perspective, detailed and comprehensive analysis of the key challenges, both existing and those which the national economy and society of the 21st century will face, have been described in a series of the institute's collective monographs, among which the most important are the following ones:

Ukraine’s Economy: Results of the Reforms and Growth Prospects (in Ukrainian) (2000), Ukraine’s Economy: Strategy and Policy of Long-Term Development (in Ukrainian) (2003); and the three-volume Strategic Challenges of the 21st Century for Ukraine’s Society and Economy (in Ukrainian) (2007).

The institute is the founder or co-founder of the scientific journals Economics and Forecasting (2000), Bulletin of the Institute of Economics and Forecasting (in Ukrainian) (2000), Economic Theory (in Ukrainian and Russian) (2003), Ukrainian Socium (in Ukrainian) (2002), as well as a selection of research papers "The History and the National Economy and economic Thought of Ukraine" (in Ukrainian) (1965, re-registered in 2008), which are included in the list of qualified scientific publications approved by the High Attestation Commission of Ukraine.

== International cooperation ==
The Institute of Economics and Forecasting of the National Academy of Sciences of Ukraine takes part in the Project LINK-UN. Ukraine's representative in the Project is the Director of the Institute Mr. V. Heyets. At the meetings of the Group of Experts of the project LINK-UN in 2008 the medium term assessments of the main macroeconomic indicators and structure of foreign commerce were presented along with the report 'Ukraine's Economic Development Outlook'.

The institute's Director, Academician V.Heyets took part in the work of the Second Session of the Team of Specialists on Innovations and Competitiveness Policies (TOS-ICP UNECE) held in Geneva February 13–15, 2008.

The Institute of Economics and Forecasting of the National Academy of Sciences of Ukraine cooperates with German Institute of Economic Research (Berlin) and with the Institute of Rational Usage of Energy of Stuttgart University (Germany) on the issues of economic and mathematical modeling of power systems.

The round table 'Financial Destabilization in Ukraine and Hungary and Their Consequences in the Conditions of Deepening Global Financial Crisis' was held in Budapest on November 24–27, 2008 within jointly researched topic of 'The Balance of Foreign and Domestic Investments in Economic Development: Ukraine's and Hungary's Policy and Practice'. The research was conducted by the IEF of the NAS of Ukraine and the Institute of World Economy of the Hungarian Academy of Sciences.

Working seminar 'Modeling of the Knowledge-Based Economies in Poland and Ukraine. Comparative Analysis', where the matters of cooperation were also discussed, was held jointly by the IEF and Lodz University's Institute of Econometrics and Statistics (Poland) in Kyiv.

IEF and Russian Humanity Sciences Foundation (Russian Federation) jointly research such topics as 'The Innovative Approach in Economic Development of Russia and Ukraine', 'Strategy of Development of Agricultural and Food Market of Russia and Ukraine', 'Effectiveness of the Public Support of Agrarian Sector of Economy'.

Joint research project 'Development of Organizational and Economic Mechanisms of the Innovative and Technological Cooperation between Russia and Ukraine' has been implemented by IEF (Section of Technological Forecasting and Innovation Policy) and Institute of Economic Forecasting of Russian Academy of Sciences (RAS IEF).

Ukrainian Academy of Sciences’ IEF and Institute of Economics of Russian Academy of Sciences commenced joint research project 'Modern Monetary and Credit Policies of Russia and Ukraine: the New Challenges and Possible Responses'. Under this project the round table 'Monetary and Credit Policies of Ukraine and Russia during Global Financial Shocks' was conducted at Institute of Economics of Russian Academy of Sciences (Moscow) on October 6, 2008.

Cooperation Agreement was signed with Institute of National Economy of Academy of Sciences of Romania. Preliminary consultations were conducted with Romanian Academy of Sciences with regard to future cooperation and the topics of joint research were determined.

Section of Forms and Methods of Economic Activity in Agricultural Sector of our Institute collaborated with Agro-Industrial Analytical Centre of Transitional Economy Institute (Russian Federation) in exploring the topic of 'Effectiveness of the Public Support of Agricultural Sector of Economy'.

Cooperation with the Combined Institute of Applied System Research (IIASA, Luxenburg, Austria) has continued. The work on the project 'Agro-Ecological Appraisal of Land Potential of Ukraine on the Basis of Methodology of Agro-Ecological Zoning' (FAO-IIASA) was undertaken jointly by IIASA and IEF of NAS of Ukraine.

Director of the Section of Monitoring Research of Socio-Economic Transformations Ms. O.Balakireva is a Consultant on Monitoring and Appraisal to UNICEF and International Charitable Foundation 'International Alliance Against HIV/AIDS in Ukraine'.
