= Joseph Cirincione =

American activist

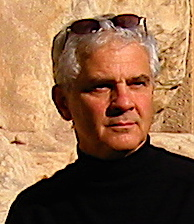
- Born: November 13, 1949 (age 76)
- Occupations: President, Ploughshares Fund

Joseph Cirincione (/ˌsɪrɪnsiˈoʊni/, SIR-in-see-OWN-ee; born November 13, 1949) is a national security analyst and author. He served as the president of the Ploughshares Fund, a public grant-making foundation focused on nuclear nonproliferation and conflict resolution.

He has one son.

== Career ==
Cirincione was appointed president of Ploughshares Fund on March 5, 2008. He retired from the position on July 1, 2020. He joined the Quincy Institute for Responsible Statecraft as a non-resident fellow in September 2020, and is an adjunct faculty member at Georgetown University's Walsh School of Foreign Service. He resigned from the Quincy Institute in August 2022 in protest of its dovish response to the 2022 Russian invasion of Ukraine, which he described as "a completely unjustified, unprovoked invasion of a sovereign state".

He is the author or editor of seven books, including Nuclear Nightmares: Securing the World Before It Is Too Late (Columbia University Press, 2013), Bomb Scare: The History and Future of Nuclear Weapons (Columbia University Press, 2007) and Deadly Arsenals: Nuclear, Biological and Chemical Threats (Carnegie Endowment, second edition 2006) and the co-author of Universal Compliance: A Strategy for Nuclear Security (Carnegie Endowment, 2005). Cirincione is also the author of over eight hundred articles and reports on defense and national security.

Cirincione has advocated for negotiations to end the diplomatic stalemate regarding the nuclear program of Iran. In 2009, he appeared on The Colbert Report. While at Ploughshares Fund, Cirincione was also the host of the nuclear security podcast, Press The Button.

Cirincione previously served as vice president for national security and international policy at the Center for American Progress in Washington, DC. For eight years, he was the director for non-proliferation at the Carnegie Endowment for International Peace, where he chaired and organized five annual Carnegie International Non-Proliferation Conferences. The 2005 conference included Cirincione's presentation, "A Brief History of the Atomic Age."

He worked for nine years in the U.S. House of Representatives, beginning in 1985 as a professional staff member of the Committee on Armed Services.
