= CRDF Global =

U.S. nonprofit organization promoting safety via innovation

Civilian Research and Development Foundation Global (CRDF Global) is an independent nonprofit organization that promotes safety, security, and sustainability through science and innovation. CRDF Global was authorized by the U.S. Congress in 1992 under the FREEDOM Support Act and established in 1995 by the National Science Foundation. This unique public-private partnership promotes international scientific and technical collaboration through grants, technical resources, and training. CRDF Global was originally named the U.S. Civilian Research and Development Foundation for the Independent States of the Former Soviet Union (CRDF).

== Mission ==
- Provide cooperative research and development opportunities that enable scientists and engineers to address critical security, economic, education and other societal needs.
- Advance peace and prosperity by funding civilian research and development projects that contribute to global nonproliferation objectives.
- Promote the application of science and technology to economic growth through international partnerships and training that foster invention, innovation, entrepreneurship and the commercialization of technology.
- Strengthen university research and education in science and engineering.

CRDF Global is based in Arlington, Virginia, and has offices in Kyiv, Ukraine; Almaty, Kazakhstan; and Amman, Jordan.

Between 1995 - 2010, CRDF Global awarded nearly 3,000 grants to more than 13,000 scientists—including 2,500 former weapons researchers—and has committed more than $105 million in total support. In addition to its own funds, CRDF Global has been able to leverage more than $42 million in additional support from foreign governments; as well as cash and in-kind contributions from participating American businesses. In addition to its grantmaking, CRDF Global has a service it provides to organizations seeking to conduct research collaborations abroad, called CRDF Solutions (formerly GAP.) Through this service, CRDF Global has facilitated more than 1,100 individual projects, valued at over $195 million, on behalf of more than 180 business and industry, education and government clients.

== History ==
The Soviet Union employed an estimated 50,000-60,000 nuclear experts, 65,000 bioweapons experts, and 6,000 chemical weapons experts. When the Soviet Union collapsed, many of these once-privileged scientists, engineers, and technicians became unemployed, underemployed, or unpaid. To prevent weapons experts from selling their knowledge to unfriendly states, the US government established or co-established several programs and organizations to provide scientists with civilian employment in their home countries. These "scientist redirection" and "scientist engagement" initiatives include the International Science and Technology Center, the Science and Technology Center in Ukraine, the State Department's Global Threat Reduction programs (formerly Nonproliferation of WMD Expertise), the Department of Energy's Initiatives for Proliferation Prevention and now-defunct Nuclear Cities Initiative, and CRDF.

In the FREEDOM Support Act of 1992, Congress established a "Research and Development Foundation" for the following purposes:

1. To provide productive research and development opportunities within the independent states of the former Soviet Union that offer scientists and engineers alternatives to emigration and help prevent the dissolution of the technological infrastructure of the independent states.
2. To advance defense conversion by funding civilian collaborative research and development projects between scientists and engineers in the United States and in the independent states of the former Soviet Union.
3. To assist in the establishment of a market economy in the independent states of the former Soviet Union by promoting, identifying, and partially funding joint research, development, and demonstration ventures between United States businesses and scientists, engineers, and entrepreneurs in those independent states.
4. To provide a mechanism for scientists, engineers, and entrepreneurs in the independent states of the former Soviet Union to develop an understanding of commercial business practices by establishing linkages to United States scientists, engineers, and businesses.
5. To provide access for United States businesses to sophisticated new technologies, talented researchers, and potential new markets within the independent states of the former Soviet Union.

The initial funding for the foundation was $5 million from the US Department of Defense and a matching donation from philanthropist George Soros. The National Science Foundation provided $300,000 for start-up activities.

CRDF Global has supported nonproliferation programs in the Departments of Defense, State, and Energy. These programs have frequently chosen to implement projects through CRDF because the foundation has some tax-free privileges, implementing agreements with foreign governments, and less bureaucracy. Typically, CRDF makes payments, imports equipment, and provides project oversight in exchange for a percentage fee.

Beginning in 2003, CRDF Global expanded its activities beyond the former Soviet Union and amended its original purpose to its current mission statement. The organization now works in Sub-Saharan Africa, Southeast Asia, the Middle East and North Africa, and the FSU. Since its establishment, CRDF has received funding from many US government agencies, along with foreign governments and organizations, and private US organizations such as the Ford Foundation and the Bill and Melinda Gates Foundation.

== Leadership ==
=== Board of directors ===
CRDF Global's board of directors is co-chaired by Dr. William Wulf, president emeritus of the National Academy of Engineering, and Ms. Dona L. Crawford, associate director of computation, Lawrence Livermore National Laboratory. The other members of the board of directors are: Dr. Jaleh Daie, managing partner of Aurora Equity; Dr. Farouk El-Baz, Research Professor and Director of the Center for Remote Sensing, Boston University; Dr. Howard Frank, professor of management science, University of Maryland, Robert H. Smith School of Business; Mr. Paul Longsworth, vice president of new ventures, Fluor Corporation; Dr. Rodney Nichols, president emeritus of the New York Academy of Sciences; Dr. Gilbert S Omenn, professor of internal medicine, human genetics and public health and director of the Center for Computational Medicine and Bioinformatics, University of Michigan; Ms. Elizabeth Rindskopf Parker, dean of the McGeorge School of Law at the University of the Pacific; Dr. Anne C. Petersen, a research professor at the Center for Human Growth and Development, University of Michigan; Dr. Susan Raymond, Executive Vice President for Research, Evaluation and Strategic Planning, Changing Our World; Caroline S. Wagner, John Glenn College of Public Affairs, The Ohio State University, and Dr. Hassan Virji, Executive Director, Global Change System for Analysis, Research and Training.

=== Advisory council ===
CRDF Global's advisory council is chaired by Ambassador Thomas R. Pickering, senior vice president of international relations (retired), The Boeing Company and vice chairman of Hills & Co. Other Advisory Council members are: Mr. Nils Bruzelius, Executive Editor and Vice-President for Publications, Environmental Working Group; Dr. Gail H. Cassell, Vice President of scientific affairs and distinguished research scholar for infectious diseases, Eli Lilly and Company; Mr. Vinton G. Cerf, vice president and chief Internet evangelist, Google; Ambassador James Franklin Collins, director and senior associate and diplomat in residence, Carnegie Endowment for International Peace; Dr. Rita Colwell, Chairman and President of CosmosID; Dr. Loren R. Graham, professor of history and science, Massachusetts Institute of Technology; Dr. William V. Harris, president and CEO of the Science Foundation Arizona; Dr. Siegfried S. Hecker, senior fellow and former director of Los Alamos National Laboratory; Dr. Najmedin Meshkati, Professor of Civil/Environmental Engineering and Professor of Industrial and Systems Engineering, University of Southern California; Dr. Richard A. Murphy, former president and CEO of the Salk Institute for Biological Studies; and Dr. Peter H. Raven, director of the Missouri Botanical Garden.

=== President and chief executive officer ===
CRDF Global's current leader is Michael A. Dignam. From 2011-2014, Mr. Dignam served as president and CEO of PAE, an Arlington, VA-based services and logistics company.

The previous president and CEO was Cathleen Campbell, who held that post 2006-2016. Prior to the CEO position, Ms. Campbell served as VP of programs and then senior VP at CRDF Global. Prior to joining CRDF Global, Ms. Campbell served from 1998 to 2002 as director of the Office of International Policy and Programs in the Technology Administration of the Department of Commerce, as well as executive director of the U.S.-Israel Science and Technology Commission. From 1995 to 1997, she was a senior policy analyst in the White House Office of Science and Technology Policy (OSTP). Campbell was the U.S. State Department's program officer for Soviet/Russia science and technology affairs from 1989 to 1994.

== Initiatives ==
=== George Brown Award for International Scientific Cooperation ===
Each year, CRDF Global presents the George Brown Award for International Scientific Cooperation to recognize the late Rep. George E. Brown Jr.'s vision for international research cooperation, and his role in the efforts leading to CRDF Global's creation. The award is presented to an individual for his or her work in advancing international cooperation in science and technology. The award was first presented in 2005 to mark CRDF Global's tenth anniversary.

The George Brown Award is open to any individual in the policy, business, science, research, or technology community who has contributed substantially to advancing international science and technology cooperation. In 2012, CRDF Global recognized three individuals for their scientific and humanitarian achievements: Mr. William Draper, III, General Partner of Draper Richards L.P and Co-Chairman of the Draper Richards Kaplan Foundation; Dr. David A. Hamburg, President Emeritus at Carnegie Corporation of New York, former president of AAAS and the Institute of Medicine; and Dr. Charles M. Vest, President of the National Academy of Engineering and President Emeritus of the Massachusetts Institute of Technology.

Past winners include Dr. Bruce Alberts; Dr. Craig Barrett; the late Dr. Norman Borlaug; Dr. Rita R. Colwell; U.S. Senator Richard Lugar (R-IN); Dr. Yuri Osipyan; Dr. John "Jack" Gibbons; Dr. King K. Holmes; Dr. Zafra M. Lerman; Dr. Brian Tucker; Dr. E. Daniel Hirleman; and Ambassador Thomas R. Pickering.

== See also ==
- Brain drain
- Nuclear nonproliferation
