= National Academy of Sciences of Western Armenia =

Armenian research institute

The National Academy of Sciences of Western Armenia (NAS WAS) (Armenian: Արևմտյան Հայաստանի ԳԱԱ, romanized: Arevmtyan Hayastani GAA) is a public, non-profit, scientific and educational institution. Its aim is to bring together Armenian scientists from across the Armenian Diaspora. Its political goals are restoring historical truth, seeking Turkey's recognition of the Armenian genocide based on international norms, and the return the occupied lands.

== History ==
The National Academy of Sciences of Western Armenia was founded on 11 March 2015 by the Constitutional Supreme Arbitral Board of Western Armenia as a subsidiary institution.

== Presidents ==
- Suren Ghazaryan (founding president)
- Artem Sargsyan

== Activities ==
The Academy has a scientific periodical, Gitak. It is published four times a year, edited by Karen Khachatrian.

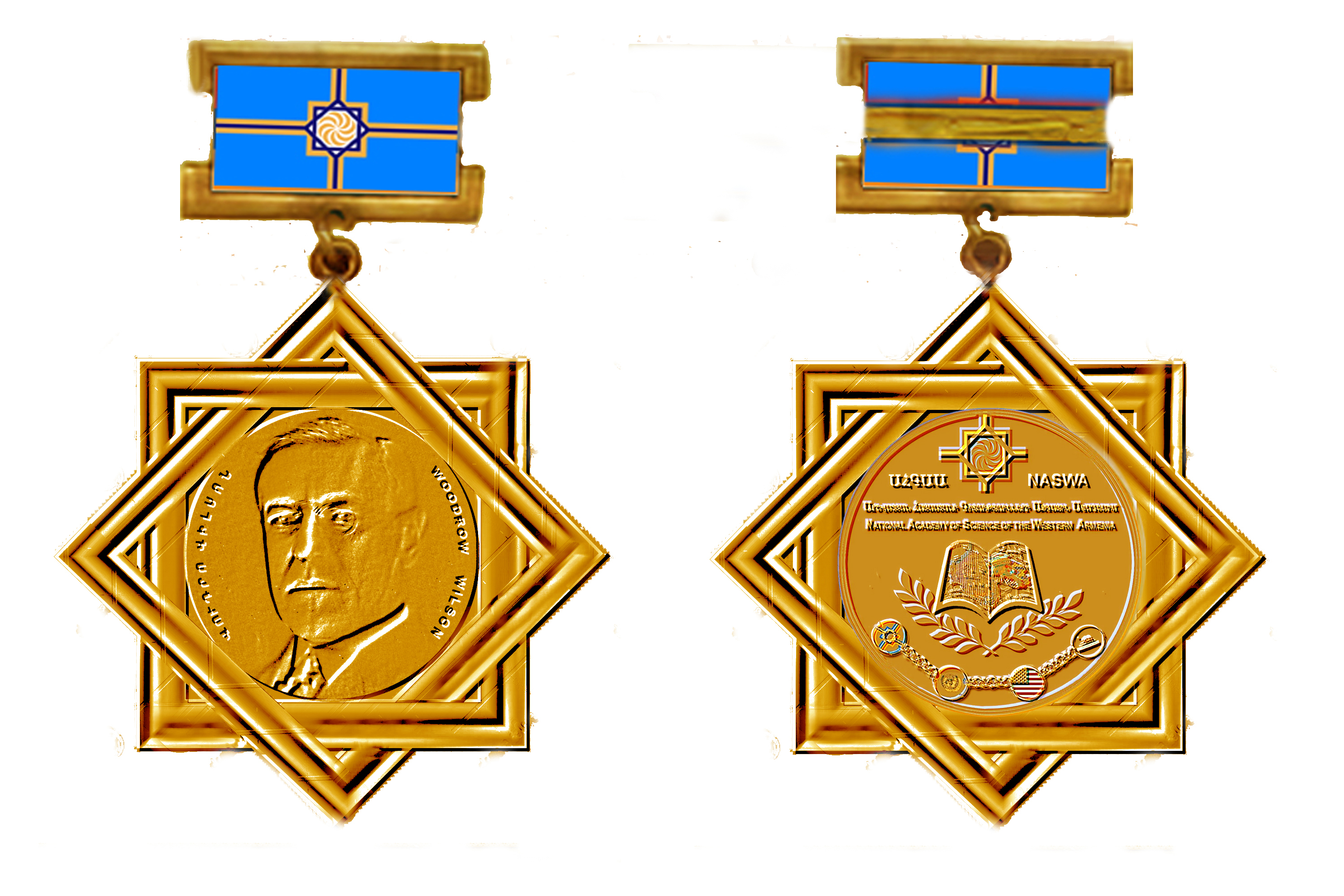
Woodrow Wilson Medal

The academy has incentives: a certificate, a diploma, and a highest award, the "Woodrow Wilson" medal, which rewards outstanding patriotic activities of Armenians and pro-Armenian foreign representatives.

Woodrow Wilson medals have been awarded to Arkady Ter-Tadevosyan (commandos), George V. Chilingar, Baroness Caroline Cox, Rep. congressman Adam Schiff, member of the French parliament Valerie Boyer, and US Senator Anna Eshoo.

== See also ==
- Education in Armenia
- Recognition of the Armenian genocide
- Science and technology in Armenia
- Wilsonian Armenia
