= Dobrov Research Institute on Scientific and Technological Potential and Science History =

Ukrainian research institute

Coordinates: 50.4467°N 30.4953°E

State Institution "Dobrov Institute for Scientific and Technological Potential and Science History Studies of the NAS of Ukraine" (Dobrov Institute)
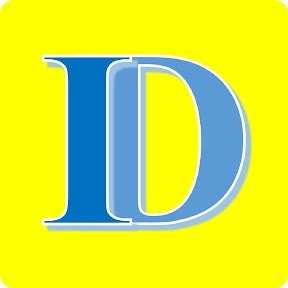
- Address: Tarasa Shevchenko Boulevard, 60, Kyiv, 01032, Ukraine
- Website: https://stepscenter.org.ua/

Dobrov Institute for Scientific and Technological Potential and Science History Studies of National Academy of Sciences of Ukraine (Dobrov Institute)

(Ukrainian: Державна установа «Інститут досліджень науково-технічного потенціалу та історії науки ім. Г.М. Доброва НАН України») is a research institute of the National Academy of Sciences of Ukraine.

== History ==
The history of the Institute dates back to the 1960s, when, under the leadership of Gennadiy Dobrov, a group of scientists started to be formed within the Department of Machine Methods for of Processing Historical and Scientific Information of the Institute of History of the Academy of Sciences of the Ukrainian SSR. The group as a Department was a part of several academic institutions:

- 1961‒1967. Department of Machine Methods for Processing Historical and Scientific Information of the Institute of History of the Academy of Sciences of the Ukrainian SSR;
- 1967‒1968. Department of Science Studies of the Institute of Mathematics of the Academy of Sciences of the Ukrainian SSR;
- 1969‒1971. A division of Complex Problems of Science Studies of the Council for the Study of the Productive Forces of Ukraine of the Academy of Sciences of Ukrainian SSR;
- 1971‒1984. Department of Complex Problems of Science Studies of the Institute of Cybernetics of the Academy of Sciences of Ukrainian SSR;
- 1984‒1986. Center for Research on Scientific and Technical Potential as part of the Council for the Study of the Productive Forces of Ukraine of the Academy of Sciences of Ukraine.
- In 1986, the Center for Research on Scientific and Technical Potential and Science History Studies of the Academy of Sciences of the Ukrainian SSR was established from the merging of the Center for Research on Scientific and Technical Potential and the Sector for the History of Natural Science and Technology of the Institute of History of the Academy of Sciences of the Ukrainian SSR.
- 1986‒1991. Center for Research on Scientific and Technical Potential and Science History Studies within the Institute of Superhard Materials of the Academy of Sciences of Ukraine.
- In 1989, the Center was named after G. M. Dobrov, the founder of the Ukrainian school of science studies, who made a significant contribution to the development of national and world science. Since 1989 Boris Malitsky has been a director of the Institute.
- In 1991, the Center for Research on Scientific and Technical Potential and Science History Studies received the status of an independent academic institute, becoming the part of the Department of Informatics of the Academy of Sciences of Ukraine.
- In 2014, the Centre was separated from the Department of Informatics and subordinated to the Presidium of the National Academy of Sciences of Ukraine.
- In 2015, the Dobrov Centre for Research on Scientific and Technical Potential and Science History Studies of the National Academy of Sciences of Ukraine was renamed into the State Institution “Dobrov Institute for Research on Scientific and Technical Potential and Science History Studies of the National Academy of Sciences of Ukraine”.

== Directors ==
- 1969–1989 — Gennady Dobrov
- 1989 — Borys Malitsky

== Main areas of research ==
– Conducting scientific research in science studies, history of science and technology, and innovation studies;

– Coordinating scientific research in the fields of science studies, the history of science and technology, and innovation studies conducted by other institutions of the NAS of Ukraine;

– Summarizing experiences, identifying long-term trends and patterns, and substantiating solutions for the development of Ukraine's scientific and technological potential within the context of global science development and the tasks of building a knowledge-based economy and society in Ukraine;

– Providing scientific and organizational support for comprehensive analytical and forecasting studies on the scientific and technological development of Ukraine conducted by scientific institutions and departments of the NAS of Ukraine;

– Conducting historical and science studies analysis of the experience, current state, and substantiation of prospects for the scientific, technological, and socio-economic development of the NAS of Ukraine, with the aim to enhance its role in society as the highest scientific self-governed organization in Ukraine, in particular: 1) explore and substantiate ways to enhance the role and contribution of the NAS of Ukraine to the formation and development of a world-class national innovation system in Ukraine; ; 2) development of proposals that concern ways and means of integration of the NAS of Ukraine into the world and European scientific spaces, including through intensification of cooperation within UNESCO, IAAS and other international organisations; 3) development of scientific and methodological support and analytical support for the interaction of the NAS of Ukraine with the country's most high-technology sectors; 4) study the experience and development of proposals for the introduction into the practice of the NAS of Ukraine of modern methods of evaluation and stimulation of the efficient operation of scientific institutions, their scientific departments and individual scientists, the use of competitive forms of research funding, preservation and renewal of scientific schools.

The Institute performs methodological, scientific and organisational, forecasting and analytical, educational and methodological functions, coordinates and provides scientific and methodological support for research in history, management and organisation of science conducted by scientific institutions and higher education establishments of Ukraine. The Institute cooperates with the Verkhovna Rada Committee on Science and Education, Ukraine’s Cabinet of Ministers, ministries, departments, scientific institutions, enterprises and organisations of Ukraine.

The Institute is the only specialised institution in Ukraine that comprehensively covers all issues related to science studies, history of science, innovation and sociology of science and technology, has world-class scientific results in these areas, provides training, and cooperates with scientific authorities through the preparation of scientific and analytical materials, including memorandums and project proposals.

== Coordination and training ==
- Dobrov Institute coordinates theoretical, methodological and applied research in the above fields conducted in the NAS of Ukraine.
- Dobrov Institute implements educational activity in the third educational and scientific level through the specialties: 051-Economics and 032-History and Archeology.
- Dobrov Institute hosts two Specialized Scientific Councils in the above specialties to award scientific degrees of Doctor of Sciences and Candidate of Sciences with the 350 successful awards of scientific degrees.

== Conferences ==
- Since 1966: biannual Kyiv international symposia on science of science and science & technology forecasting.
- Since 1989: annual Dobrov readings in commemoration of Gennady Dobrov, founder of the Kyiv academic school on science of science, the first director of the center.
- Since 2001: international forums sponsored and supported by UNESCO and the International Association of Academies of Sciences.

== International science & technology cooperation ==
- Joint projects performed with research institutions from the EU, the CIS, other countries and international organizations.
- Researchers of the Institute are experts in international programs; members of the European Association of Research and Technologies, the European Association of Evolutionary Economy, the International Union of Scientometrics and Informetrics, the European Research and Education Program; members of editorial boards in scientific journals Education and Science (Bulgaria), Technological Learning, Innovation and Development (Switzerland) and others.
- Since 2011, the Institute has been the basic organization of National Contact Point of the EU FP7 on research and technological development in “Social Sciences and Humanities”, since 2014 - of the EU Framework Programme for Research and Innovation "Horizon 2020" in the field "Europe in a changing world – Inclusive, innovative and reflective societies".

== Publishing ==
- Since 1993 — A quarterly international journal Science and Science of Science (follower of an interdisciplinary collection Science of Science and Informatics, 1970–1993).
- Since 1998 — Problems of Science, an interdisciplinary scientific journal (in collaboration with Kyiv State Center for Science & Technology and Economic Information of the Ministry of Education and Science, sports and Youth of Ukraine).
- Since 1986 — Essays on Natural Science and Technology History.

== Scientific departments ==
- Department for Science and Technology History (Head - Dr., Prof. A. Lytvynko).
- Department for Systemic Studies of Science and Technology Potential (Head - Dr., Prof. O. Mekh).
  - Joint Laboratory of the Ministry of Education and Science of Ukraine and the NAS of Ukraine on the Problems of Design and Implementation of Science and Technology Policy in Ukraine (Head - Dr. I. Bulkin).
- Department for Problems of Operation and Development Strategies of the NAS of Ukraine (Head - Dr. O. Mischuk).
- Center for Innovation and Technological Development (Head - Dr., Prof. O. Vasylieva).

== Administration ==
- Director ‒ Dr. Borys Malitsky
- Deputy Directors for Scientific Work ‒ Dr. Oleh Mekh and Dr. Oleh Kubalsky;
- Deputy Director for Scientific and Technical Work ‒ Yuri Khomenko
- Scientific Secretary ‒ Anton Koretsky

== Location ==
Address: Dobrov Institute for Scientific and Technological Potential and Science History Studies of National Academy of Sciences of Ukraine (Dobrov Institute). 60, Tarasa Shevchenko Blvd., Kyiv, Ukraine, 01032.
