= Ploughshares Fund =

Non-profit anti-nuclear weapons organization

Ploughshares
- Ploughshares Fund
- Formation: 1981; 45 years ago
- Founder: Sally Lilienthal
- Type: Foundation
- Tax ID no.: 94-2764520
- Legal status: 501(c)(3) organization
- Location: San Francisco, California, US
- President: Emma Belcher
- Chair: Gretchen Hund
- Website: ploughshares.org

Ploughshares Fund is a public grantmaking foundation that supports initiatives to prevent the spread and use of nuclear weapons, and to prevent conflicts that could lead to their use. Ploughshares Fund is a 501(c)(3) foundation that pools contributions from individuals, families and foundations. Ploughshares Fund enables individual contributors to pool resources and provide support for initiatives to prevent the spread and use of nuclear weapons. With over $100 million awarded in grants since its founding in 1981, Ploughshares Fund is the largest US philanthropic foundation focused exclusively on nuclear weapons.

== History ==
Concerned about the world's burgeoning nuclear arsenals, San Francisco philanthropist and activist Sally Lilienthal founded the organization in 1981. Since it was founded, Ploughshares has made grants totaling nearly $100 million to hundreds of people and organizations around the world. Lilienthal died in October 2006, at the age of 87, while still serving as Ploughshares Fund's president.

In 2008, the Board of Directors appointed Joseph Cirincione as Ploughshares Fund's president, the same year that the organization opened an office in Washington, DC. Cirincione stepped down as president in July 2020 and was succeeded by Dr. Emma Belcher, formerly of the MacArthur Foundation.

== Issue areas ==
Ploughshares Fund's grantmaking is focused on the following issues:

- Promoting the reduction and eventual elimination of nuclear weapons
- Preventing the emergence of new nuclear states
- Building regional peace and security

== See also ==
- Anti-nuclear movement
