= Sally Lilienthal =

American nuclear disarmament activist

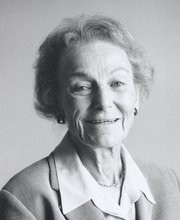
- Born: Sally Ann Lowengart; March 19, 1919; Portland, Oregon, United States
- Died: October 24, 2006 (aged 87); San Francisco, California, United States
- Other names: Sally Cohen, Sally Hellyer, Sally Lowengart Cohen Hellyer
- Education: Sarah Lawrence College, California School of Fine Arts
- Known for: Sculptor, nuclear disarmament activist, community leader
- Spouse(s): Arthur J. Cohen Jr. (m. 1945–1950; death), George Hellyer (m. 1950s–1963; divorced), Philip Lilienthal (m. 1970–1984; death)

Sally Ann Lilienthal (March 19, 1919 – October 24, 2006), née Lowengart, was an American nuclear disarmament activist who founded the Ploughshares Fund in 1981 during the Cold War in the belief that the threat of nuclear war overshadowed everything else. The Ploughshares Fund continues to provide grants to individuals and organizations advocating against nuclear weapons. Lilienthal also served as national vice chairwoman of Amnesty International in 1977. Lilienthal was also an artist and art advocate who served on the board of the San Francisco Museum of Modern Art for most of the 1970s.

== Early life and education ==
Sally Ann Lowengart was born in Portland, Oregon on March 19, 1919, to Jewish parents. She moved with her family to San Francisco at age twelve. Her father was a merchant. Lilienthal was enrolled at the private Katherine Delmar Burke School in San Francisco, but was soon expelled for passing a note containing a vulgar word in class. Lilienthal graduated from Sarah Lawrence College in New York, where she majored in writing, in 1940, and returned to San Francisco the same year. By this time, Lilienthal had developed idealistic political views.

She was married three times; her first marriage was to Arthur J. Cohen Jr.. Follow by a marriage to George Hellyer, which ended in divorce; and marriage to Philip Lilienthal.

== Career ==
During World War II, Lilienthal moved Washington, D.C., where she wrote radio dramas for the Office of War Information. She became engaged to Arthur J. (Tom) Cohen Jr., a Navy lieutenant stationed in the Pacific. They married in 1945, after the war, and returned to San Francisco. In San Francisco, Lilienthal volunteered for a local anti-discrimination league, and in the early 1950s studied sculpture at the California School of Fine Arts (now the San Francisco Art Institute). Lilienthal made, exhibited, and sold works in clay, plastic, and resin, and remained an active sculptor until 1971.

Lilienthal began to collect art. In the early 1960s, she was appointed to the San Francisco Arts Commission. Lilienthal also started an art auction series as a benefit for the San Francisco Art Institute and various political causes, including Eugene McCarthy's 1968 campaign for the Democratic presidential nomination. During the 1970s, Lilienthal was a member of the board of the San Francisco Museum of Modern Art; in 1978, she co-founded the museum's Rental Gallery (now the SFMOMA Artists Gallery).

Lilienthal's husband Cohen died in the 1950s, and Lilienthal subsequently married lawyer George Hellyer; they divorced in 1963. In 1970, she married Philip Lilienthal, who was the associate director of the University of California Press. The couple founded the northern California chapter of the NAACP Legal Defense and Educational Fund. In 1971, Lilienthal and Ginetta Sagan founded the Western Region of Amnesty International. Lilienthal also served as the national vice chairwoman of Amnesty International in 1977, the year Amnesty won the Nobel Peace Prize. Lilienthal also served on the board of the American Civil Liberties Union of Northern California.

Lilienthal founded the Ploughshares Fund in her living room in 1981, at the height of the Cold War, to advocate against nuclear weapons. In an interview with the San Francisco Chronicle on the Fund's fifteenth anniversary, Lilienthal said, "The possibility of a nuclear war was the very worst problem in the world. I thought that if a lot of people felt the same way I did but didn't know what to do about it, we might get together and search for new ways to get rid of the nuclear weapons that were threatening us all." Lilienthal said that the organization "started with nothing. I mean really nothing," but in its first year was "able to give away about $100,000 to individuals and small organizations to study the problems of nuclear weaponry and to get ordinary citizens informed about the issues and the danger."

By the time of Lilienthal's death in 2006, the Ploughshares Fund had given nearly $50 million to the cause of nuclear disarmament, mostly toward startup research, and had become (according to The Washington Post) "the largest grant-making foundation in the United States focusing exclusively on peace and security issues." The Fund was an early funder and major supporter of the International Campaign to Ban Landmines. The Ploughshares Fund also made a $3,000 grant "to send scientists from the Natural Resources Defense Council to Moscow for what resulted in a breakthrough agreement allowing the installation of seismic monitoring equipment, which proved that a nuclear testing ban could be verified" and a $5,000 grant to Massachusetts Institute of Technology physicist Theodore Postol for him "to finish a technical paper that exposed the Pentagon's exaggerated claims of the effectiveness of Patriot missiles during the Persian Gulf War."

== Death ==
Lilienthal died on October 24, 2006, at the California Pacific Medical Center in San Francisco, at the age of 87, from a bone infection that led to pneumonia. In an interview with The Washington Post after her death, George Perkovich, Vice President for Studies at the Carnegie Endowment for International Peace said:

"Sally was an absolutely vital figure in supporting researchers, policy activists and scientists in the U.S. and overseas who were trying to change government policies while [governments] were inflating the powers of nuclear weapons.

The thing about Sally that was so great is she went out and hustled and raised that money, then gave it away, which is heroic. ... Sally had a lot of guts and wasn't afraid of anything."

Lilienthal was survived by five children from her first marriage, two stepdaughters, and 11 grandchildren. Her husband Philip Lilienthal died of cancer in 1984.

== Honors ==
Lilienthal received an honorary doctorate from the San Francisco Art Institute. She also received the Council on Foundations's Robert Scrivner Award for Creative Philanthropy in 1987, and the United Nations Association's Eleanor Roosevelt Humanitarian Award in 1990.
