= Institute for Informatics and Automation Problems =

Research institute in Yerevan, Armenia

- Other name: Computer Center NAS RA
- Established: 1957
- Head: Hrachya Astsatryan
- Location: Yerevan, Armenia
- Coordinates: 40°12′45.4″N 44°31′57.2″E
- Interactive map of Institute for Informatics and Automation Problems

Institute for Informatics and Automation Problems (IIAP) (Armenian: Ինֆորմատիկայի և ավտոմատացման պրոբլեմների ինստիտուտ) is a scientific research institution of the Armenian National Academy of Sciences. In 1957 it was founded as Computing Center of NAS of Soviet Armenia and Yerevan State University. The Institute of Informatics and Automation Problems is a leading research institute of the National Academy of Sciences of Armenia in the field of applied mathematics, computer science and the introduction of computing technologies in various fields of science and technology.

It was founded in 1957 as the Computing Center of the Academy of Sciences of the Armenian SSR and Yerevan State University.

The first Director IIAP was the mathematician Sergey Mergelyan.

At the beginning of the 50s, the main research areas of the Institute were computer science and applied mathematics. Soviet Armenia was one of the key centers of computing and research activities of the Soviet Union in the field of industrial computing, software development, etc. The Institute became the founder of various modern areas of applied mathematics. Many scholars worked in the Computing Center in diverse research fields of cybernetics and applied mathematics. Among them were Sergey Mergelyan, Ashot Petrosian, Rom Varshamov and Igor Zaslavski.

Since 1963, the Institute for Informatics and Automation Problems has published the journal "Mathematical Problems of Computer Science".

The title of institute was changed after the collapse of Soviet Union. IIAP carried out master's degree school.

In 1994, the Armenian Scientific and Research Computer Network (ASNET-AM) was developed, created and operated at IIAP. It serves more than 65 networks of scientific and educational organizations operating in different regions of Armenia.

In 2004, the Institute launched a supercomputer "Armklaster".

It was planned to create a National Supercomputer Center at the Institute on 2015.

Currently, the institute is actively cooperating with EU organizations in the direction of supporting knowledge-intensive small enterprises.
