= Rod Diridon Sr. =

American politician (1939–2026)

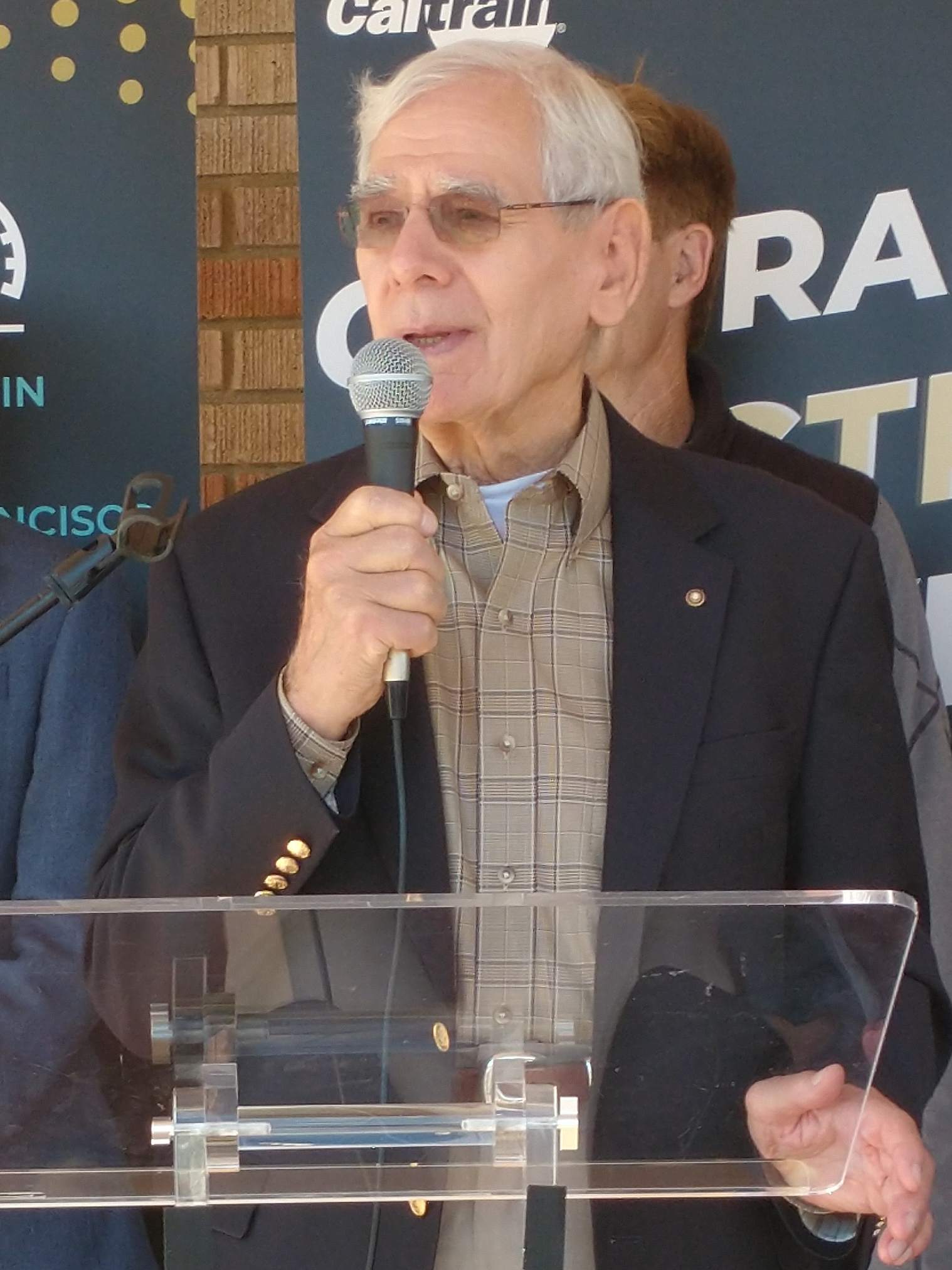
- Diridon in 2024
- Born: Rodney John Diridon; February 8, 1939; Yreka, California, U.S.
- Died: April 3, 2026 (aged 87)
- Education: San Jose State University
- Occupations: elected official, non-profit leader
- Known for: Chair, Santa Clara County Board of Supervisors, Chair, California High-Speed Rail Authority, San Jose Diridon Train Station
- Political party: Democratic
- Spouses: Mary Ann Fudge (m. 1964; div. 1999); Gloria Duffy (m. 2001)
- Children: 2

Rodney John Diridon Sr. (February 8, 1939 – April 3, 2026) was an American politician known for his leadership in mass transportation. He served as chair of the California High-Speed Rail Authority from 2001 to 2003. He chaired the advisory board of the United States High Speed Rail Association, and he chaired the National Heritage Area Project for Santa Clara County, California. The New York Times called Diridon "a tireless advocate of public transport for the Bay Area."

Diridon was also active in Silicon Valley in leadership on environmental issues, the arts and culture, higher education, community organizations, and philanthropy.

== Early life and education ==
An Italian-American, Rod Diridon Sr. was born on February 8, 1939, in Yreka, California, the son of Claude Diridon, a railroad brakeman, and Rhoda Covert, a piano teacher. He grew up in the small town of Dunsmuir, at the foot of Mt. Shasta in Siskiyou County, California. Diridon worked his way through college as a railroad brakeman and fireman. He graduated from San Jose State University in 1961 with a Bachelor of Science in accounting and finance, continuing to earn a Master of Science in business administration with a concentration in statistics in 1963. Diridon then attended United States Naval Officer Candidate School and served on active duty in the United States Navy from 1963 to 1967. During this time, he served two combat tours on destroyers in Vietnam as an anti-submarine warfare officer and a weapons officer. His collateral duties included serving as ship's chaplain, cryptographer, auditor, legal officer, and communications officer. He completed his service with the rank of Lieutenant Jr. Grade.

== Career ==
After returning from Vietnam, Diridon became a management systems analyst at Lockheed Missile and Space Corporation in Sunnyvale, California. He founded the Decision Research Institute in 1969, which did statistical research, needs assessments, and organizational consulting for public agencies and candidates for public office.

Chairing his neighborhood homeowners' association in Saratoga, California, Diridon successfully advocated for retention of a neighborhood park, mobilizing the support of 17 other homeowners' associations in the city. He was then approached by local leaders and encouraged to run for the Saratoga City Council.

Diridon was first elected as the youngest-ever member of the Saratoga City Council in 1973. He was elected to the Santa Clara County Board of Supervisors in 1974, representing the Fourth Supervisorial District. He served five terms as a member of the Board from 1975 until 1995, and he served six times as its chair. During his service on the Board, Diridon chaired several San Francisco Bay Area regional government agencies, including the Metropolitan Transportation Commission (MTC), the Association of Bay Area Governments (ABAG), and the Bay Area Air Quality Management District (BAAQMD).

The papers from Diridon's 24 years in public office are archived at San Jose's Martin Luther King, Jr. Library.

== Silicon Valley transportation ==
After he chaired the successful 1976 campaign for the first half-cent sales tax for a transit district in California, Diridon became known as "the father of modern transit service" in Silicon Valley. This tax funded, among other projects, a light rail system for Santa Clara County. While in office, Diridon chaired nine public rail construction and operation projects. These included the Santa Clara County Rapid Transit Development Project, which created a master plan for transportation for Silicon Valley.

Beginning in 1974, Diridon convened and chaired the Peninsula Transportation Alternatives Project that led to the CalTrain commuter rail system from San Francisco to San Jose and Gilroy. He served on the Joint Powers Board that guided the negotiations to acquire and manage that system until his retirement in 1995. From 1975 to 1991, Diridon chaired the Guadalupe Corridor Light Rail Project Joint Powers Board to design and build the 21-mile project. Diridon also chaired the 1982–1996 project to design and build the Tasman East Corridor and Tasman Corridor West light rail projects. From 1982 to 1995, Diridon convened and chaired the Vasona Corridor Light Rail Joint Powers Board that designed and built the light rail line from San Jose to Los Gatos. He assisted the creation of Joint Powers Boards to begin and operate commuter rail systems between Stockton, in California's Central Valley, and San Jose (the Altamont Express), and for the Capitol Corridor rail between Sacramento and San Jose.

Beginning in 1988, Diridon chaired the San Jose Station Study Joint Powers Board to determine whether the historic main Southern Pacific/Amtrak train station in downtown San Jose should be retained after being damaged in the 1989 Loma Prieta earthquake. The study recommended the retention of the station and expansion of the facilities to accommodate additional rail service including CalTrain, light rail, the Bay Area Rapid Transit (BART) system, high speed rail, a bus interchange point, and the Capitol Corridor and Altamont Express trains. The construction was completed in 1994. San Jose Diridon station was renamed for Rod Diridon in 1994 at the time of his retirement from the Santa Clara County Board of Supervisors.

== California High Speed Rail Authority ==
In 2000, Diridon was appointed to the California High Speed Rail Authority by Governor Gray Davis and was then re-appointed by Governor Arnold Schwarzenegger. Diridon chaired the Authority Board from 2001 to 2003, serving two years beyond the eight-year limit for the board and stepping down in 2010. During his tenure as chair, the California state legislature authorized a ballot measure for bond funding of the high speed rail project, Proposition 1A, which was approved by voters in 2008.

== National and international transportation leadership ==
Diridon served as vice chair of the International Association of Public Transport (UITP) in Brussels, Belgium. He chaired the American Public Transit Association (APTA) in 1992 and later its High Speed Intercity Rail Committee, and he co-founded APTA's Diversity Council.

He chaired the National Council of University Transportation Centers (CUTC).

== Mineta Transportation Institute ==
In collaboration with then-House Transportation Committee Chairman Norman Mineta, Diridon prepared the legislative language for Congress to create a new university-based transportation research center that focused on mass transportation policy studies. Through the 1991 ISTEA legislation, the US Congress authorized the creation of the new center. Santa Clara County voted in term limits for county officials in November 1992, precipitating Diridon's retirement from the county Board of Supervisors. After his retirement at the end of 1994, Diridon became the founding executive director of the Mineta Transportation Institute (MTI), based at San Jose State University. Diridon directed the Institute from 1993 to 2014.

Under his leadership, MTI performed an annual needs assessment with the United States Department of Transportation and California Department of Transportation, which identified research priorities. Based on these priorities, MTI conducts peer-reviewed research involving teams of academic and professional specialists, distributing the reports via publications, conferences, and the Internet. MTI research focuses on best practices internationally, through case studies on issues such as transit systems security, transportation financing, and transportation-related land use policies and sustainability.

A needs assessment in the early 1990s identified the lack of a master's degree program teaching transportation systems management in the United States. MTI designed a Master of Science in Transportation Management (MSTM) degree program, which was accepted for accreditation by the California State University Board of Trustees in 1996. Three specialized certificates are also offered—in transportation security, transportation finance, and high-speed rail management. Diridon arranged for the classes to be taught via the California Department of Transportation video-conference system at 28 locations throughout California. With degrees granted through San Jose State University, the program has graduated more than 300 students.

== California Trolley and Railroad Corporation ==
Diridon founded CTRC in 1982 to collect and restore historic trolley cars for use on rail lines in San Jose. He chaired CTRC from 1982 to 2014, retired for a year, and then resumed chairing the organization in 2016. In 2014, the CTRC historic trolley barn in San Jose's History Park, where work on the historic rolling stock is completed, was named the Rod Diridon Sr. Trolley Barn.

== Philanthropy ==
Diridon served for 20 years as the chair of the Joseph B. Ridder Foundation, administering funds donated by friends of the late newspaper publisher, which funded journalism and mass communication fellowships primarily at San Jose State University. He also co-chaired the late-1990s fund drive efforts for three of the perimeter gate monuments for San Jose State University. He served on the Tower Foundation board at San Jose State University, which advises the university president and raises funds for the university. He established and funded Diridon Leadership Scholarships at the College of Business and the women's athletic program at San Jose State University. He worked to establish a scholarship endowment at the Mineta Transportation Institute, for which he was also a donor.

Diridon founded the San Jose Symphony Foundation and served on its board. He served on the regional Wells Fargo Bank Corporate Advisory board. He chaired capital campaigns and annual fund drives for the San Jose Metropolitan YMCA, the Santa Clara County Music and Arts Foundation, and the California Trolley and Railroad Corporation, and for 11 years, he chaired the annual Jamboree and fund drive for the Santa Clara County Council of the Boy Scouts of America.

== Other roles ==
Diridon chaired non-profit boards at the local and regional levels. He served as president of the San Jose Symphony, the San Jose Rotary Club, the San Jose Junior Chamber of Commerce (Jaycees), the San Jose United Service Organizations (USO), and the Central San Jose YMCA. He chaired the Santa Clara County Mental Health Association and was the founding chair of the Santa Clara County branch of the National Council on Alcoholism. He chaired the board of Breathe California of the Bay Area, formerly the American Lung Association. In the field of education, Diridon chaired the board of Lincoln Law School of San Jose, which focuses on educating veterans, moderate-income, and minority students. Diridon was also the immediate past chair of the Santa Clara County League of Conservation Voters.

Diridon served on a number of corporate boards, including the San Jose Business Bank and San Jose National Bank. Since 1970, he has been a director of Empire Broadcasting Corporation, owner of South Bay radio stations KRTY 95.3 FM and KLIV 1590 AM, among the last locally owned radio stations in Silicon Valley.

== Personal life and death ==
From 1964 to 1999, Diridon was married to Mary Ann Fudge. They had two children. In 2001, he married Gloria Duffy. Diridon died from sepsis caused by a rare cancer, spindle cell carcinoma of a sarcomatoid type of the thorax, on April 3, 2026, at the age of 87.

== Honors and awards ==
In 1973, Diridon was named one of the Ten Outstanding Young Men in America, by the US Junior Chamber of Commerce. In 2014, he received the Hall of Fame Award from the American Public Transit Association and the Lifetime Achievement Award from the Council of University Transportation Centers. In 2016, Diridon received the Don Goldeen Award from the San Jose Rotary Club for significant contribution to the City of San Jose. In 2019, Diridon was honored as the "Legacy Champion" in the Community Impact Awards by the San Jose Business Journal. Diridon was a Life Member of the International Green Industry Hall of Fame.

Political offices
Preceded by Ralph Merkins	Santa Clara County Supervisor, 4th District; 1974 – December 5, 1994	Succeeded by Jim Beal
