= Science and Public Policy =

Peer-reviewed scientific journal

- Discipline: Policy studies
- Language: English
- Edited by: Sybille Hinze; Jeong-Dong Lee; Nicholas Vonortas; Caroline Wagner

Publication details
- History: 1974–present
- Publisher: Oxford University Press (England)
- Frequency: 10/year
- Impact factor: 1.368 (2017)

Standard abbreviations
- ISO 4: Sci. Public Policy

Indexing
- ISSN: 0302-3427 (print); 1471-5430 (web)
- LCCN: 74644114
- OCLC no.: 1043967447

Links
- Journal homepage; Online archive

Science and Public Policy is a peer-reviewed scientific journal covering science policy. It was established in 1974 and is published ten times per year by Oxford University Press. The editors-in-chief are Sybille Hinze (Deutsches Zentrum für Hochschul- und Wissenschaftsforschung), Jeong-Dong Lee (Seoul National University), Nicholas Vonortas (George Washington University), and Caroline S. Wagner (Ohio State University). According to the Journal Citation Reports, the journal has a 2017 impact factor of 1.368.
