= Science and Technology Center in Ukraine =

International non-proliferation organization

The Science and Technology Center in Ukraine commonly known as the STCU, is an intergovernmental organization dedicated to the non-proliferation of nuclear, biological and chemical weaponry and related technologies. It was established in 1993, through an international multilateral treaty to help scientists and researches involved in the research, development and production of nuclear, biological and chemical assets in former Soviet member states to transition from military to civilian, market oriented careers in their fields of expertise. The STCU was established and continues to receive its funding from Canada, Sweden (later the European Union) and the United States to provide grants and funding for projects which employ these scientists and engineers.

== Background ==
By 1984 close to a quarter of the Soviet Unions Gross National Product had been allocated for defense spending. The former Soviet Union conducted research, development and deployed nuclear, biological and chemical weaponry and had employed several thousand scientists, physicists and engineers with expertise in these areas. The collapse of the Soviet Union lead to the unemployment of many of these scientists and engineers while others had not received payments for their employment. The West believed that the dissemination of expert knowledge in these areas or the employment of these researchers and developers of these military assets by unfriendly nations or terror networks would lead to the proliferation of nuclear, biological and chemical weaponry. Also there were doubts about proper and secure storage of dangerous biological material and other substances in remote labs.

Therefore the western countries provided funding grants to keep these researchers and developers employed on civilian oriented projects thus preventing them from selling their services or expertise to enemy nation states or organizations. Canada, the European Union and the United States funded these projects by establishing organizations and foundations through which funds and grants were provided to projects which employed these scientists and engineers.

== Member Nations ==
The original donor member nations were Canada, Sweden and the United States. In 1997, the original treaty was amended to include the European Union supplanting Sweden's membership in the organization.

=== Sponsor ===
Japan (1998–present)

=== Donor Nations ===
Canada (1993–present)
Sweden (1993–1997, supplanted by EU)
European Union (1997–present)
United States (1993-2026)

=== Recipient Nations ===
Azerbaijan
Georgia
Ukraine
Uzbekistan

== See also ==
- Nunn-Lugar Act and the Cooperative Threat Reduction program
- International Science and Technology Center (ISTC)
