= Guadalupe River Park =

Park in San Jose, California, United States

Coordinates: 37°20′49″N 121°54′26″W

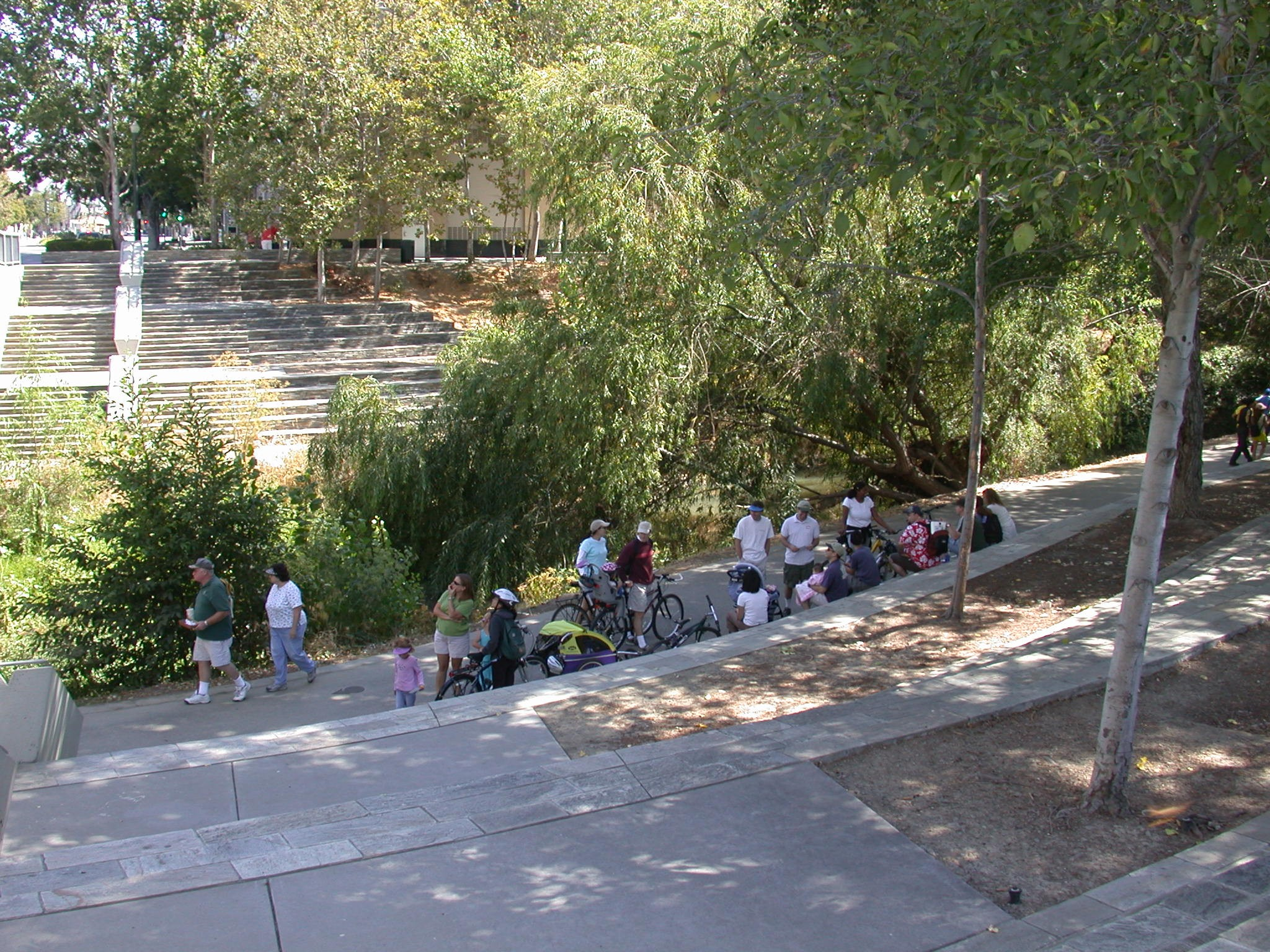
- Interactive map of Guadalupe River Park
- Owner: San Jose
- Operator: Guadalupe River Park Conservancy

The Guadalupe River Park is a city park in San Jose, CA. It is a 120-acre park on the banks of the Guadalupe River for about 2.6 miles in the downtown. It was opened in 2005 after the adjoining section of the river was lined with concrete for flood protection.

The park contains a green adjacent to the SAP Center, tennis courts, a visitor center, and installations of public art. The Guadalupe River Trail runs through the park.

The Guadalupe River Park was neglected after opening, leading to calls for revitalization to turn around a homelessness crisis. These calls have led to some proposals and actions to clean trash and engage unhoused in the area.

One public art initiative in the park involves seating areas for San Jose's sister cities. In 2023, a 440 lb statue of Shivaji I that was part of an installation for the city of Pune was stolen from the park. It was quickly recovered.
