= International Science and Technology Center =

Nonproliferation organization in Astana, Kazakhstan

The International Science and Technology Center (ISTC) is an intergovernmental organization focused on nonproliferation, biosafety (and similar topics) connecting scientists with their peers and research organizations in other countries. The ISTC headquarters is currently in Astana, Kazakhstan. Member governments have included Armenia, the European Union, Georgia, Japan, Kazakhstan, the Republic of Korea, Kyrgyzstan, Norway, Tajikistan, and the United States. Scientists from nearly 60 countries have participated in ISTC activities.

ISTC facilitates international science projects and assists the global scientific and business community to source and engage scientists and institutes that develop or possess an excellence of scientific know-how.

== History ==
The ISTC was established in 1992. Its headquarters were originally in Moscow and it governed further scientific centers in the former Soviet Union in order to redirect the expertise of CBRN scientists to civil research fields.

In July 2015, the ISTC moved to Astana’s Nazarbayev University after The Russian Federation demanded more secrecy and withdrew from the activity.

== See also ==
- Science and Technology Center in Ukraine
- Nunn-Lugar Act about financing the Cooperative Threat Reduction program
