= MPC&A =

Nuclear asset protection process

Material Protection, Control and Accounting (MPC&A) refers to the safeguarding of nuclear assets, including nuclear fuel and weapons. In the United States, the National Nuclear Security Administration (NNSA), a component of the Department of Energy, oversees MPC&A as part of its non-proliferation program.

The United States-Russia MPC&A program began in 1994, separate and in parallel with the United States Department of Defence (DOD) Cooperative Threat Reduction Program, following the passage of the Soviet Nuclear Threat Reduction Act of 1991. It sought to improve the security of nuclear weapons and nuclear weapons' material through upgrades to material protection, material control and accounting at nuclear sites in Russia and other countries of the former Soviet Union, through cooperation between the United States Department of Energy and the Russian Federal Agency on Atomic Energy (Rosatom). The program improved the security of thousands of tons of weapons-grade nuclear material in the Former Soviet countries (FSU).

== MPC&A Overview ==
MPC&A systems are intended to protect nuclear materials from theft or diversion, and to detect such events if they occur. The elements of a modern MPC&A system are

- Physical protection systems that "allow for the detection of any unauthorized penetration of barriers and portals, thereby triggering an immediate response, including the use of force if necessary."
- Material control systems that "prevent unauthorized movement of materials and allow for the prompt detection of the theft or diversion of material."
- Material accountability systems that "should ensure that all material is accounted for, enable the measurement of losses, and provide information for follow-up investigations of irregularities."
- Personnel reliability through "security screening, indoctrination, and training."
- Procedural controls such as "two-man rule"

== US-Russia MPC&A program ==
=== Background ===
After the Cold War, the Department of Energy estimated that Russia and the New Independent States (NIS) possessed "603 metric tons of weapons-usable nuclear material - enough to produce 41,000 nuclear devices" at 53 sites. The nuclear material, enriched uranium and plutonium-239, at Russian sites was determined to be vulnerable to theft because the "security system that protected this material during the Soviet period has weakened considerably due to a sustained period of political and economic upheavals."

In addition to the MPC&A program, the United States and Russia also made agreements to dispose and protect Russian nuclear weapons. The U.S. provided two billion dollars through the START program to help transport nuclear materials from Belarus, Ukraine and Kazakhstan to safe locations in Russia.

=== Government-to-government program ===
The United States Department of Defense began the government-to-government program in 1992. However, formal U.S.-Russian Federation MPC&A cooperation began on 2 September 1993 with an implementing agreement under the Cooperative Threat Reduction (or Nunn-Lugar) Program between the Department of Defense and the Russian Ministry of Atomic Energy (Min Atom). An initial $10 million was allocated from the Nunn-Lugar funds.

The government-to-government program was initiated in 1994 at the ELEMASH Machine-Building Plant (MSZ) low-enriched uranium production facility in Elektrostal, Moscow Oblast. The United States allocated an additional $20 million to establish MPC&A processes at Sverdlovsk, however the Russian government, wary of establishing MPC&A efforts and reject the offer to preserve the historically secretive nuclear complex. However, on 20 January 1995, the U.S. and Russian governments agreed to joint MPC&A efforts at five sites – highly enriched uranium fuel fabrication facility at Elektrostal, the Mayak Production Association in Ozersk, formerly Chelyabinsk-65; the Institute of Physics and Power Engineering, Obninsk; the Luch Scientific Production Association (Podolsk) (NPO Luch); and the All-Russian Scientific and Research Institute of Atomic Reactors (SRIAR) in Dimitrovgrad-10.

The government-to-government program struggled to develop for numerous reasons. Both the Department of Defense and Min Atom were weighed down by bureaucracy, regulations and suspicion due to concerns about divulging nuclear secrets that had been closely guarded for 50 years during the Cold War. The stringent "buy-American" clause of the Nunn-Luger legislation stated that funds for MPC&A training and equipment were to be spent in the United States and not in the former Soviet Union. The program would eventually be merged into the Department of Energy's (DOE) laboratory-to-laboratory program, with DOE being able to secure better cooperation with Min Atom and the program no longer constrained by the spending limits of the Nunn-Luger legislation. The DOE would become the Executive Agent for all U.S. cooperative MPC&A efforts under Presidential Decision Directive 41.

=== Lab-to-lab program ===
Early cooperation between the governments of the United States and Russia had focused on MPC&A demonstration projects at Low Enriched Uranium (LEU) facilities to initiate confidence building measures between the countries. In 1994, the Department of Energy initiated a complementary "laboratory-to-laboratory" approach to encourage cooperation between US national laboratories and Russian nuclear institutes. According to Ronald H. Augustson and John R. Phillips, scientists at the Los Alamos National Laboratory had been informally discussing MPC&A controls with Russian scientists from Arzamas-16, particularly with Sergei Zykov and Vladimir Yuferev. Undersecretary of Energy Charles B. Curtis was urged to accelerate the stalled Nunn-Luger efforts in a Senate Armed Services Committee hearing on reports of thefts of Russian nuclear materials in 1992 and 1993. He then met with Siegfried S. Hecker, the director of the Los Alamos National Laboratory, who suggested that the existing lab-to-lab scientific collaboration between Los Alamos and Arzamas-16 be extended to include MPC&A.

In June 1994, a delegation from Los Alamos visited Arzamas-16 to sign six contracts, five to "produce specific products for computerized controls and accounting" and a sixth to "combine the products of the first five contracts into a demonstration that could be used to raise interest in materials control and accounting among the leaders of the Russian nuclear institutes." The Los Alamos delegation also signed contracts with scientists of the Kurchatov Institute in Chelyabinsk-70 and with the Institute of Physics and Power Engineering at Obninsk. The lab-to-lab cooperation was expanded in the United States to include five U.S. national laboratories - Brookehaven, Lawrence Livermore, Oak Ridge, Pacific Northwest and Sandia.

In September 1995, President Bill Clinton issued Presidential Decision Directive 41 (PDD-41) on "U.S. Policy on Improving Nuclear Material Security in Russia and Other New Independent States" that assigned formal responsibility to the Department of Energy for directing the MPC&A Program. The DOE created the Russia/NIS Nuclear Material Security Task Force, signed a formal agreement with Gosatomnadzor (GAN), Russia's nuclear regulator, and initiated cooperation with independent nuclear sites to develop a regulatory framework. In 1996, the US and Russian governments agreed to expand MPC&A cooperation to the Russian Navy.

In 1997, the "government-to-government" and "lab-to-lab" programs were merged into a single program with the DOE implementing an improved computer-based financial and status monitoring system for monitoring projects and establishing upgraded guidelines in 1998 to ensure consistency between projects. The DOE initiated "emergency measures" in response to 1998 Russian financial crisis, providing winter clothes and heaters to Russian site guards. On 7 February 1997, in the prelude to the Clinton-Yeltsin summit in Helsinki, Acting Secretary of Energy Charles B. Curtis and Russian Minister of Atomic Energy and co-chairman of Atomic Energy Policy Viktor Mikhailov signed a joint statement that "reaffirmed each side's commitment to bilateral nuclear materials protection, control and accounting (MPC&A) program" and included the "Instrument Research Institute (Lytkarino) in the program" from that year. The two noted that "15 Russian Russian Ministry of Atomic Energy (MIN ATOM) facilities were incorporated into the MPC&A program during the previous three sessions of the Gore Chernomyrdin Commission. Six additional MIN ATOM facilities also engage in MPC&A related activities through a cooperative program between each side's nuclear laboratories, known as the "lab-to-lab" program. A total of 44 sites in the former Soviet Union participate in the MPC&A program."

In 1999, the DOE initiated the Material Consolidation and Conversion (MCC) program to consolidate nuclear material into fewer buildings and sites, and to convert them into forms unusable in nuclear weapons. The MPC&A program with the Russian Navy also expanded from fresh nuclear to nuclear weapons storage sites, securing 4,000 nuclear warheads located in 42 storage sites. In 1999, the Material Security Task Force evolved into a permanent organisation, the Office of International Material Protection and Emergency Cooperation (NN-50).

=== Other Department of Energy programs ===
The Department of Energy also implemented two programs to discourage Russian nuclear weapons scientists from selling their knowledge to others. The Initiatives for Proliferation Prevention (IPP) program funded non-military applications that could have had commercial value in the United States and former Soviet republics. Lab-to-lab contacts identified technologies within former Soviet weapons facilities that could have commercial applications. The program also matched U.S. government funds with funds from U.S. companies that sought to commercialize these technologies. The United States Congress authorized approximately $20-30 million for this program each year since FY 1994.

The Nuclear Cities Initiative (NCI) was designed to bring commercial enterprises to Russia's closed cities so that "scientists and engineers would not be tempted to sell their knowledge to nations seeking nuclear weapons." It helped finance a computing centre in Sarov to produce software for sale around the world. The Clinton Administration had requested and received $30 million for NCI in FY 2001. However, the Bush Administration cut funding for the NCI program, requesting only $6.6 million for FY 2002. The NCI program ended in late 2003 because the United States and Russia were unable to complete a new implementing agreement due to differences in liability protections.

== Sources ==
- International Atomic Energy Agency
- Nuclear proliferation
- Radiation protection
- "Materials Protection, Control, and Accounting (MPC&A) | The Stimson Centre | Pragmatic Steps for Global Security." Materials Protection, Control, and Accounting (MPC&A) | The Stimson Centre | Pragmatic Steps for Global Security. Stimson.org, 30 May 2007. Web. 29 Oct. 2014.
- Woolf, Amy F. "Nuclear Weapons in Russia: Safety, Security, and Control Issues." LIBRARY OF CONGRESS WASHINGTON DC CONGRESSIONAL RESEARCH SERVICE, 2003.
- Doyle, Jim. "Improving Nuclear Materials Security in the Former Soviet Union: Next Steps for the MPC&A Program. (Nuclear Material Protection, Control and Accounting)." Arms Control Today 2 (1998): 12. Print.
- Medeiros, Evan S. "Gore-Chernomyrdin Commission Expands Nuclear Security Cooperation.(Russia-US Cooperation on Nuclear Materials Security)." Arms Control Today 5 (1996): 25. Print.
