= Kenneth C. Brill =

American diplomat

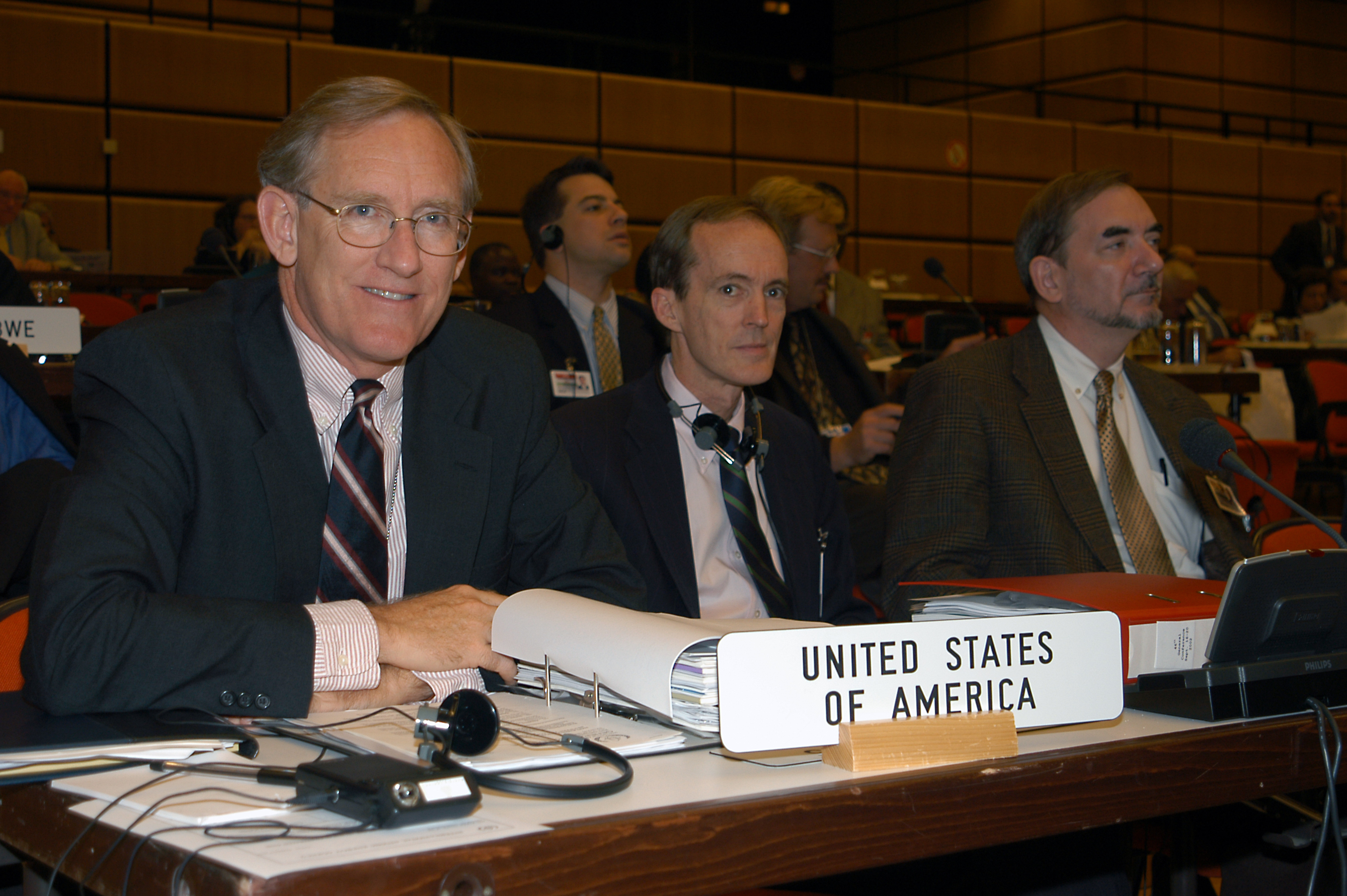
- Kenneth C. Brill in 2002

5th United States Ambassador to the United Nations International Organizations in Vienna
- In office October 1, 2001 – June 29, 2004
- President: Bill Clinton; George W. Bush
- Preceded by: John B. Ritch III
- Succeeded by: Gregory Schulte

United States Ambassador to Cyprus
- In office July 11, 1996 – July 25, 1999
- Preceded by: Richard Boucher
- Succeeded by: Donald Keith Bandler

16th Executive Secretary of the United States Department of State
- In office 1994–1996
- Preceded by: Marc Isaiah Grossman
- Succeeded by: William J. Burns

Personal details
- Education: Ohio University, University of California, Berkeley
- Profession: Diplomat

Kenneth C. Brill is a retired US diplomat. He served as ambassador to the IAEA and the U.N. Office in Vienna; ambassador to Cyprus (1996–1999); acting ambassador and deputy chief of mission at the Embassy in New Delhi, India; and political counselor at the U.S. Embassy in Amman. He is on the Board of Directors of The Stimson Center.

== Biography ==
Brill graduated from Ohio University and received his MBA from the University of California, Berkeley.

== Career ==
Brill retired from the Foreign Service after 35 years and became president of The Fund for Peace from 2010 to 2011. His final position at the State Department was founding director of the National Counterproliferation Center (NCPC) (part of the Office of the Director of National Intelligence).
