= Bandler =

Bandler is a surname. Notable people with the surname include:

- Donald K. Bandler (1947–2017), American diplomat
- Faith Bandler (1918–2015), a.k.a. Ida Lessing Faith Mussing, Australian civil rights activist
- John Bandler (1941–2023), Canadian, engineer, entrepreneur, artist, speaker, playwright, and author
- Richard Bandler (born 1950), American self-help author
- Vivica Bandler (1917–2004), Finnish theater director and agronomist
