= Project Sapphire =

1994 US government covert operation

Project Sapphire was a successful 1994 covert operation of the United States government in cooperation with the Kazakhstan government to reduce the threat of nuclear proliferation by removing nuclear material from Kazakhstan as part of the Cooperative Threat Reduction Program, which was authorized by the Soviet Nuclear Threat Reduction Act of 1991.

A warehouse at the Ulba Metallurgical Plant outside Ust-Kamenogorsk housed 1,322 pounds (600 kg) of weapons grade enriched uranium (90% ^{235}U) to fuel Alfa class submarines. Following the dissolution of the Soviet Union, the fuel was poorly documented and secured, and in danger of being sold for use in the construction of nuclear weapons. This mission stands as a successful attempt of a country secretly moving into another country to protect them from the dangers of nuclear weapons left behind by the Soviet Union.

== Background ==
Careless nuclear testing in the northeast of Kazakhstan as a result of the Cold War and the arms race between the Soviet Union and the United States resulted in the spread of belief in 'nuclear neuralgia' amongst the country's citizens. The development of these health issues as well as the adoption of Gorbachev's glasnost campaign sparked a public anti-nuclear movement in Kazakhstan. The independence of Kazakhstan also saw the rise of leaders who sought to differentiate themselves from the former communist nation. Once a part of the USSR, Kazakhstan was very reliant on relations with Russia in the 90's. With millions of ethnic Russians living in the country, leaders of Kazakhstan did not want to create trouble because of Russia's influence on their economics, factories, and technology. They also wanted to remove post-Soviet nuclear materials because Kazakhstan lacked the facilities and technical capacity to sustain nuclear weapons. Prior to the collapse of the USSR, Kazakhstan's first president Nazarbayev announced that the country would be a non-nuclear state once it was admitted into the United Nations. In May 1992, Nazarbayev joined the Treaty on the Non-Proliferation of Nuclear Weapons. Further conversations with US president George H. W. Bush and senators Richard Lugar and Sam Nunn created stronger ties between Kazakhstan and the United States. Finally economics pushed Kazakhstan towards de-nuclearization because the country's large oil reserves could only be sourced by Western technology. Obtaining this western support would only be possible with non-nuclear proliferation and joining the NPT.

The Nunn–Lugar Cooperative Threat Reduction program was established in 1986 in order to minimize the threat of nuclear proliferation especially in Asia and the Soviet Union. The Nunn-Lugar Act was inspired and sponsored by Sam Nunn and Richard Lugar to take on Project Sapphire and dismantle nuclear weapons in Former Soviet blocs as showed in Kazakhstan.

== Event ==
The fall of the Soviet Union left nuclear weapons materials spread across developing countries. Two United States Senators, Sam Nunn and Richard Lugar, in office at the time, saw the importance of monitoring the location of these materials, so that they could help prevent nuclear proliferation. It was a fear that the lack of monitoring would result in the aid of underdeveloped or threatening countries that did not previously have access to this weapons grade materials. In the early 1990s, the two senators were able to deduce a number of resources that Kazakhstan had because they became aware of the resources the Soviet Union had in the newly formed country. Kazakhstan's highly enriched uranium (HEU) was left behind by a Soviet submarine project and there was enough of the material to fuel 24 atomic bombs. The uranium-235 was 90-91% enriched in pure metal form.

The Russian government was not interested in recovering the HEU; officials including Viktor Mikhailov, Viktor Chernomyrdin, and Boris Yeltsin variously described it as "waste" and said that Kazakhstan or the United States could have it. However, Project Sapphire was conducted in secrecy to reduce the risk that any other country's government would learn about the uranium and try to steal it.

After months of preparation, 31 agents forming the specialised Nuclear Emergency Recovery Team were recruited in October 1994 to embark on a covert mission to remove the uranium. On October 7, President Bill Clinton signed a classified directive to approve the airlift - composed of 3 C-5 aircraft - to leave from Delaware's Dover Air Force Base to Kazakhstan. The team spent 12 hours a day from October 14 to November 11 packing up uranium (including seven different types of uranium, some laced with toxic beryllium) in extreme secrecy. The team found 1032 containers in the warehouse and repacked the material into 448 shipping containers. Bad weather set in and on the way to the airport the trucks carrying the HEU were almost compromised due to the ice and sleet. Finally the planes were loaded and flew for 20 hours (the longest flight for a C-5 in U.S. history) back to Delaware.

On November 23, 1994, the Clinton Administration announced that the uranium had been removed.

== Aftermath ==
The United States compensated Kazakhstan for the value of the uranium. According to Vladimir Shkolnik, head of the Agency on Nuclear Energy of Kazakhstan, Kazakhstan received compensation worth US$30 million. This included medical equipment, computers, vehicles, and other equipment. The project also enabled nuclear-related scientific research in Kazakhstan.

Since Project Sapphire, HEU has been removed from 20 research reactors from various former Soviet bloc nations. This project shows how through the United States' economic, diplomatic, and technical resources, Kazakhstan was able to draw closer in its effort to become a non-nuclear weapons state.

The effects from Project Sapphire are seen today in U.S. foreign policy and trade. The U.S.'s nuclear clean out programs, such as the Nunn–Lugar Cooperative Threat Reduction, were vital to former Soviet countries such as Kazakhstan, Belarus, and Ukraine in that they prevented the proliferation of Post Soviet nuclear materials. There are currently 9 members in the nuclear club including The United States, Russia, the United Kingdom, France, China, India, Pakistan, Israel, and North Korea.

== In popular culture ==
In Victor Lee's 2013 novel Performance Anomalies, the clandestine removal of weapons-grade uranium under Project Sapphire was not complete, resulting in a secret cache of uranium in Kazakhstan that attracts jihadis.

The Netflix documentary series Turning Point: The Bomb and the Cold War covers Project Sapphire at about the 50-minute mark of episode 7, "The End of History."

== See also ==
- Nunn–Lugar Cooperative Threat Reduction—the source of the funds for Project Sapphire
