= Shawn Gallagher =

American baseball player and nuclear engineer

Shawn Gallagher was the National Security Council's Director for Nuclear Threat Reduction in the Obama Administration. Gallagher was a former professional baseball player in the Texas Rangers, Kansas City Royals, and Montreal Expos organizations. A nuclear engineer, Gallagher was the first ever student to graduate from the Massachusetts Institute of Technology (MIT) with two degrees in nuclear engineering within four years.

== United States Government ==
Gallagher served as the NSC Director for Nuclear Threat Reduction from June 2010 to August 2012, with primary responsibility for President Obama's nuclear security agenda including the four-year Lockdown effort and Nuclear Security Summit process. Gallagher is credited for innovating a new form of diplomacy, Gift Basket Diplomacy, that he helped implement through the Nuclear Security Summit preparatory process and that has since been exported to other multilateral fora such as climate change and nonproliferation negotiations. Laura Holgate who was then the NSC Senior Director for WMD Terrorism and Threat Reduction worked with the White House WMD Czar Gary Samore to first implement the policy.

Gallagher's responsibilities also included domestic nuclear energy policy, where he led the process to save several hundred million dollars on nuclear decommissioning activities within the US and was integral in securing US Government and US industry aid to Japan in response to the Fukushima nuclear disaster including the immediate delivery of UAVs to Japan assess damage without risking personnel safety.

After his government career, Gallagher worked under government contracts as an advanced concepts engineer on cutting edge technologies for the defense industrial base. Technologies Gallagher worked included quantum sensors, advanced microelectronics, human-machine system integration, and planetary defense.

== Professional Baseball ==
Gallagher spent seven seasons in professional baseball, including a stint on the Texas Rangers' 40-man roster in 1999. In 1998, Gallagher was named MVP of the Florida State League after becoming the first ever player to drive in 100 runs and score 100 runs in the same season. During his MVP season for the Port Charlotte Rangers Gallagher hit .308 and had 26 HR, 121 RBI, 18 SB, and 111 R. Gallagher finished his career with exactly 100 home runs.

The Texas Rangers drafted Gallagher in the 5th round of the 1995 Amateur Draft after a high school career where he rewrote the North Carolina State High School record book. Gallagher tied a national record with a 51 game hitting streak and another one by hitting five home runs in one game.

== Softball ==
Gallagher was the head of the nationally-recognized Ashburn Shooting Stars youth girls softball program from 2014 to 2021, one of the largest programs in the Washington DC region. Gallagher is a vocal advocate for female sports, noting the gender inequality between baseball and softball and attempts to close the commercial gap. His public comments on the subject have focused on female athletes playing for the love of the game, knowing there are not multi-million dollar contracts to be had like there are for male athletes.

== Education ==
After baseball, Gallagher attended the Massachusetts Institute of Technology. He became the first student ever to earn an undergraduate and master degree in Nuclear Engineering within four years. Upon graduation, MIT turned Gallagher's thesis into a patent on a radiation detection system capable of detecting nuclear weapons in cargo containerships.
