= John B. Ritch III =

American diplomat (born 1943)

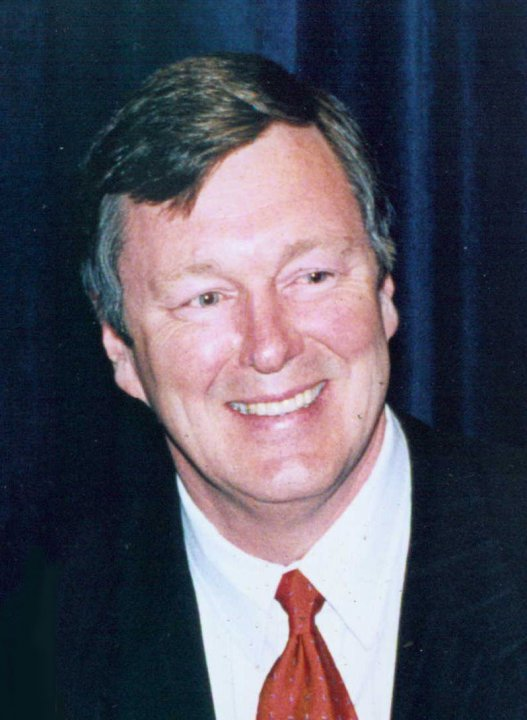
- John B Ritch III at WNA Annual Symposium in September 2007

4th United States Ambassador to the United Nations International Organizations in Vienna
- In office November 22, 1993 – January 1, 2001
- President: Bill Clinton
- Preceded by: Michael H. Newlin
- Succeeded by: Kenneth C. Brill

John B. Ritch III (born March 13, 1943) is a former American diplomat whose career includes extensive experience on the congressional side of US foreign policy and in international business. After early service as a captain in the US Army (1968–1972) and then a staff adviser on the Senate Foreign Relations Committee (1972–1993), he was appointed by President of the United States Bill Clinton to serve as the United States Ambassador to the United Nations International Organizations in Vienna, a position he held from 1993 to 2001. Thereafter, as a business executive from 2001 to 2012, he headed the World Nuclear Association, the London-based trade association that encompasses the worldwide nuclear energy industry. Meanwhile, as a sidelight, in 1992 Ritch co-founded an international company that has attained three decades of success in marketing US-made nutritional products throughout much of Europe.

== Early life and education ==
Ritch was born into a Navy family during World War II and grew up in the postwar years in locations on the East and West Coasts associated with the military career of his father, a 1939 graduate of the Naval Academy. Ritch's grandfather, a Montanan, one-time cowboy, and longtime friend of famed painter Charlie Russell, was among the new state's first historians, known for his nostalgic poetry and beguiling reminiscences about the fast-disappearing West.

Ritch III attained a moment of national fame at age 10 by winning a local contest in Bremerton, Washington (home of Puget Sound Naval Shipyard) that offered a bicycle to the top collector of used shoes for war refugees in Korea. On April 19, 1953, dominating the front page of New York's Sunday News (then the nation's major tabloid) was "Johnnie Ritch" sitting atop a mountain of 10,000 pairs of shoes piled dockside in Bremerton for shipment to Korea. Ritch alone had gathered 1,325 pairs by taking a wagon door to door; and the national wire services had carried the story to newsrooms across the country.

After a youth filled with peewee league and school sports, Ritch graduated in 1960 from Traip Academy in Kittery, Maine (a public high school near the Portsmouth Naval Shipyard). Ritch studied for one year at Rensselaer Polytechnic Institute, then entered the US Military Academy at West Point, graduating in 1965. There he was an Academic All-American and all-N.I.T. in basketball and selected to be a Rhodes Scholar. Ritch received the Eastern Collegiate Athletic Conference award as the outstanding scholar-athlete of West Point's class of '65.

At Oxford University from 1965 to 1968, Ritch studied Philosophy, Politics and Economics at University College. He played on an Oxford University Basketball team that came close, but for a travel mishap, to achieving a perfect slate of three consecutive British national championships at both the university and amateur levels. During that period, Ritch's teammates included future New York Knick Bill Bradley and now-eminent novelist John Edgar Wideman.

== Career ==
After Oxford, Ritch served as an infantry captain in the US Army from 1968 to 1972, commanding a rifle company on the DMZ in Korea and working in the Pentagon on the staff of the Army Chief of Staff. In 1970, as a goodwill gesture to the Korean Republic, the Army assigned Ritch to spend four months in Seoul as coach of Korea's Olympic basketball team as it prepared for that year's Asian Games.

In 1972, Ritch worked briefly for the new Environmental Protection Agency before joining the then-small and bipartisan staff of the US Senate Foreign Relations Committee (SFRC), chaired by legendary Senator William Fulbright.

On the committee, Ritch's first job was to aid chairman Fulbright in gaining Senate approval for two landmarks in US-Soviet arms control: the SALT-I accord and the Anti-Ballistic Missile Treaty.

Early in his work for the committee, Ritch drafted the Foreign Relations Authorization Act. For the next 25 years, this annual legislation served not only to authorize appropriations for the State Department budget but also as a vehicle for bipartisan amendments shaping the policies and institutions of American diplomacy. Among the laws Ritch drafted is the delineation of the authority and responsibility of an American ambassador for all US activities in the country to which they were appointed to serve.

After 1979, when the previously unified SFRC staff was enlarged and bifurcated along partisan lines, Ritch worked on the Democratic side with such noted Senators as Church, McGovern, Pell, Sarbanes, Kerry, Dodd, Moynihan, and, most extensively, with Joe Biden. In that more bipartisan era, Ritch also worked cooperatively with Republican senators such as Aiken, Case, Percy, Mathias, and Lugar.

From 1972 to 1993, under six committee chairmen, Ritch specialized in European and NATO affairs and also, at various times, directed the work of subcommittees on State Department operations, Asian affairs, and constitutional war powers.

For two decades, while working on hearings, speeches and legislation, Ritch traveled extensively for the committee, often represented the Senate in sessions of the NATO Parliamentary Assembly, and was the principal drafter of committee publications on NATO nuclear strategy and the SALT II treaty, US-Soviet relations, the Portuguese revolution, Hungarian communism, the world heroin trade, politics and strategy on NATO's southern flank, the Soviet war in Afghanistan, international failure to defend the Bosnian republic, and Senate responsibilities overseeing the war and treaty powers.

In 1984, after covertly crossing the Pakistani border to spend time with Afghan resistance forces in the field, Ritch authored a Senate report describing the Soviet army’s brutalities in Afghanistan. Some months later, when Soviet authorities balked at allowing Ritch to accompany a Senatorial visit to Moscow, declaring him “persona non grata” in the Soviet Union, the delegation’s leaders (Senators Joe Biden and William Cohen) cancelled the trip. This episode became a minor cause célèbre during a contentious phase in US-Soviet relations. But a year later, after General Secretary Mikhail Gorbachev came to power, Moscow relented and the ban on Ritch was lifted.

In 1988, Ritch played an active role in shaping the Senate’s response to the Reagan administration’s purported “reinterpretation” of the ABM Treaty, a highly controversial maneuver aimed at supporting Reagan’s “Star Wars” vision by permitting the creation of a weapon the treaty was explicitly intended to prohibit. Acting on Biden’s behalf after the Senator was hospitalized by a brain aneurysm, Ritch worked with other Committee members (and fellow staffer James Rubin) to advance a measure, known as the Biden Condition, that rebuffed the “reinterpretation” by affirming explicitly the normally implicit principle that every US treaty must be interpreted in accord with the Senate’s reasonable understanding of its meaning at the time of ratification. After the Senate attached the Biden Condition to its approval of the US-Soviet treaty on intermediate-range nuclear missile forces (INF), that treaty and the Biden Condition’s enunciation of broad constitutional principle became a part of US law.

A year later, after the Berlin Wall fell, Ritch conceived and helped enact the Support for East European Democracy (SEED) Act of 1989.

From 1993 to 2001, as American ambassador to UN agencies in Vienna during the two Clinton terms, Ritch's main role was representing the US on the governance board of the International Atomic Energy Agency. There he worked with then-IAEA directors Hans Blix and Mohamed Elbaradei on the agency's dual task of monitoring compliance with the Nuclear Non-Proliferation Treaty and assisting nations in the use of nuclear technologies for medicine, agriculture, industry, and carbon-free electricity generation.

During Ritch’s tenure in Vienna, the US assisted a special IAEA team that located and dismantled Iraq's nuclear program. This multinational achievement was confirmed in 2003 when the second US invasion of Iraq revealed no weapons of mass destruction.

From 2001 to 2012, Ritch was in the private sector as director general of the World Nuclear Association, the London-based trade association for companies that comprise the global nuclear energy industry. The WNA was created in 2001, when Ritch and a few industry leaders undertook to build on the foundation of the Uranium Institute a fully inclusive body for a diverse industry that consists of uranium miners, fuel makers, reactor vendors, electrical utilities, and related professions in more than 30 countries. During Ritch's 12-year tenure, WNA membership quintupled from fewer than 40 companies to nearly 200. This success in recruiting most of the world’s enterprises with a significant role in the generation of nuclear power has positioned WNA to foster cooperation within, and to represent, this key global industry.

As WNA head, Ritch was an international advocate for expanded use of nuclear power, propounding its role as an environmentally beneficial technology of crucial value in preventing catastrophic climate change. As an industry spokesman, Ritch also responded to public alarm over the Japanese accident at Fukushima.

In 2003, to mark the 50th anniversary of President Eisenhower's Atoms-for-Peace initiative, Ritch conceived and launched the World Nuclear University, sponsor of an annual "summer institute" that each year brings together young nuclear-energy professionals from some 30 nations. In 2007, Ritch led WNA in creating World Nuclear News, which now serves as an authoritative internet resource providing comprehensive daily news and analysis on events in the global nuclear industry.

As an American sideline, Ritch has engaged in historic preservation in the nation's capital. Notably, he created John Logan House, once a home and now a tribute to the heroic Civil War commander who went on to found Memorial Day and serve in the US Senate as a champion of civil rights and advancement for newly freed black Americans. Ritch salvaged the building in 1975 when it was derelict and collapsing, then began the research and renovation that yielded a Logan Circle landmark. In the early 1980’s, near Logan Circle, Ritch gained the placement of Wardman Row—seven early-20th-century apartment buildings created by famed developer Harry Wardman—on the National Register of Historic Places; he then began renewal of that block by renovating two of its buildings. More recently, on Capitol Hill adjacent to the Library of Congress, Ritch revitalized a mid-century apartment building now known as The Montana.

In other entrepreneurship, Ritch co-founded CaliVita International, an overseas supplier and multi-level marketer of American-made vitamin supplements. Since its launch in 1992, the Calivita sales system has attracted hundreds of thousands of participants and resulted in the export of a large volume of US products to some three dozen European countries.

Ritch's publications include pieces in The Atlantic and Prospect magazines, The Washington Post, The New York Times, The International Herald Tribune, World Energy Review, Bulletin of the Atomic Scientists, and Arms Control Today, and two law journal articles—on the war and treaty powers of the Constitution—co-authored with then-Senator Joe Biden.

Ritch and his wife Christina have two daughters, Nina Ritch Boland (Michael) and Alyssa Ritch-Frel (Jan), and three grandsons, Samuel, Vincent, and John (Jack).
