= Agreement Between the Government of the United States of America and the Government of the Russian Federation Regarding Cooperation in the Area of Nuclear Material Physical Protection, Control, and Accounting =

1999 Russia–US arms control treaty

The 1999 Agreement Between the Government of the United States of America and the Government of the Russian Federation Regarding Cooperation in the Area of Nuclear Material Physical Protection, Control, and Accounting was instrumental to the continuation of the release of funds under the Soviet Nuclear Threat Reduction Act of 1991. This document built on the success of the 1992 Agreement.
