= Laura Holgate =

American diplomat (born 1965)

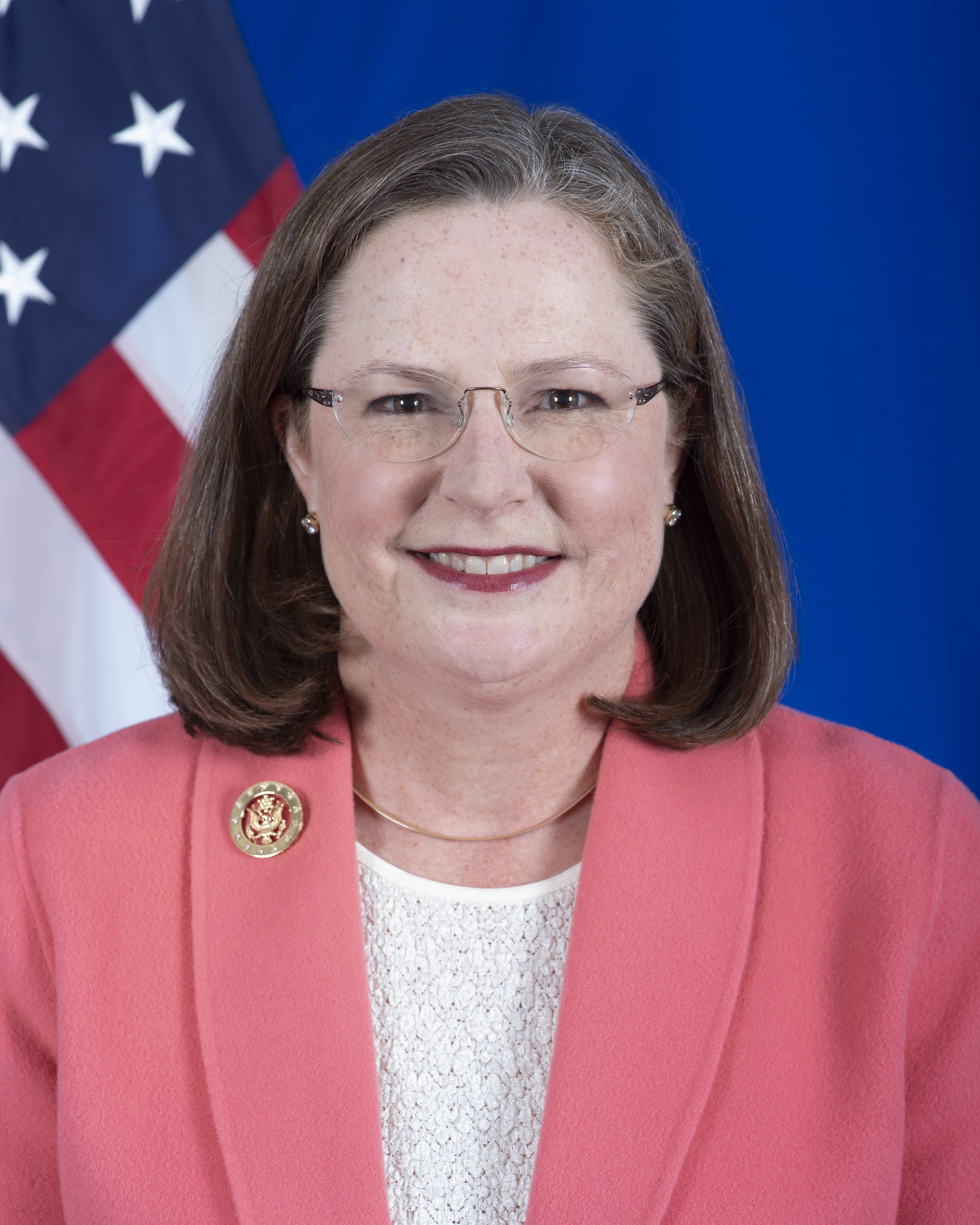

9th and 11th United States Ambassador to the United Nations International Organizations in Vienna
- In office February 1, 2022 – January 20, 2025
- President: Joe Biden
- Preceded by: Jackie Wolcott
- Succeeded by: Preston Wells Griffith III
- In office July 18, 2016 – January 18, 2017
- President: Barack Obama
- Preceded by: Joseph Macmanus (2014)
- Succeeded by: Jackie Wolcott

Personal details
- Born: Laura Susan Hayes; 1965 (age 60–61)
- Education: Princeton University (BA); Massachusetts Institute of Technology (MA)

Laura Susan Hayes Holgate (born 1965) is an American diplomat who served as the United States ambassador to the United Nations International Organizations in Vienna and to the International Atomic Energy Agency from 2022 to 2025 and previously from 2016 to 2017.

== Education ==
Holgate earned a Bachelor of Arts degree from Princeton University and a Master of Arts in political science from Massachusetts Institute of Technology.

== Career ==
Holgate began her career at the Belfer Center for Science and International Affairs at Harvard University.

From 1995 through 1998, Holgate was special coordinator for cooperative threat reduction at the Department of Defense, working on the Nunn–Lugar Cooperative Threat Reduction program. From 1998 to 2001, she directed the U.S. Department of Energy’s Office of Fissile Materials Disposition from 1998 to 2001.

Holgate was a founding Vice President of Nuclear Threat Initiative, leading its Russia/New Independent States programs from 2001 to 2009.

Laura Holgate after the Nuclear Security Summit 2010

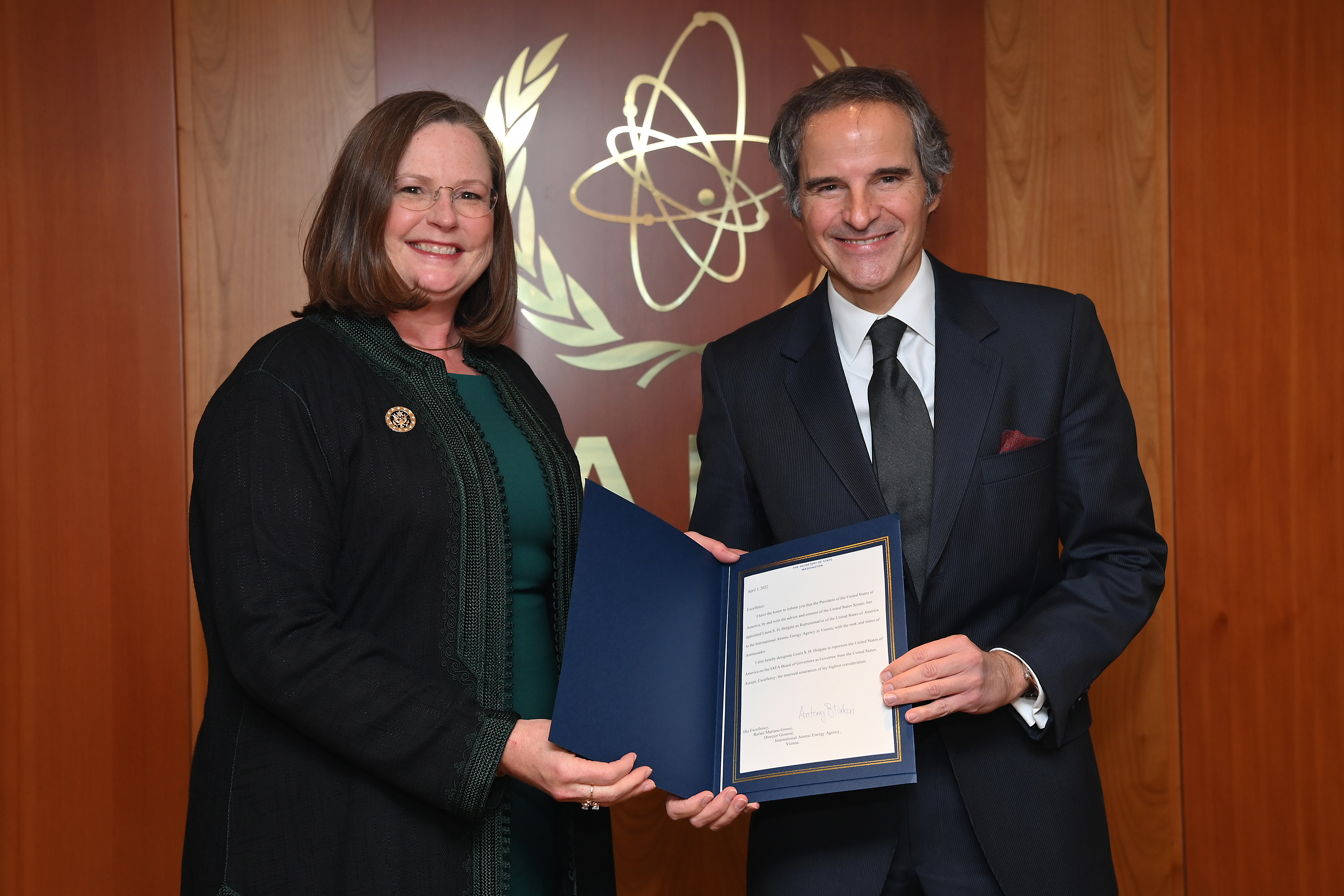
Laura Holgate presenting her credentials to IAEA Director General Rafael Mariano Grossi as the new Resident Representative of the United States of America to the IAEA (April 2022)

From 2009 to 2016, Holgate served as the special assistant to the president and senior director for weapons of mass destruction terrorism and threat reduction on the U.S. National Security Council. She was the U.S. Sherpa to the Nuclear Security Summits and worked with White House WMD Czar Gary Samore to first implement Gift basket diplomacy in the 2010 Nuclear Security Summit and 2012 Nuclear Security Summit. National Security Council (NSC) Director for Nuclear Threat Reduction Shawn Gallagher is credited with conceiving and first proposing the policy.

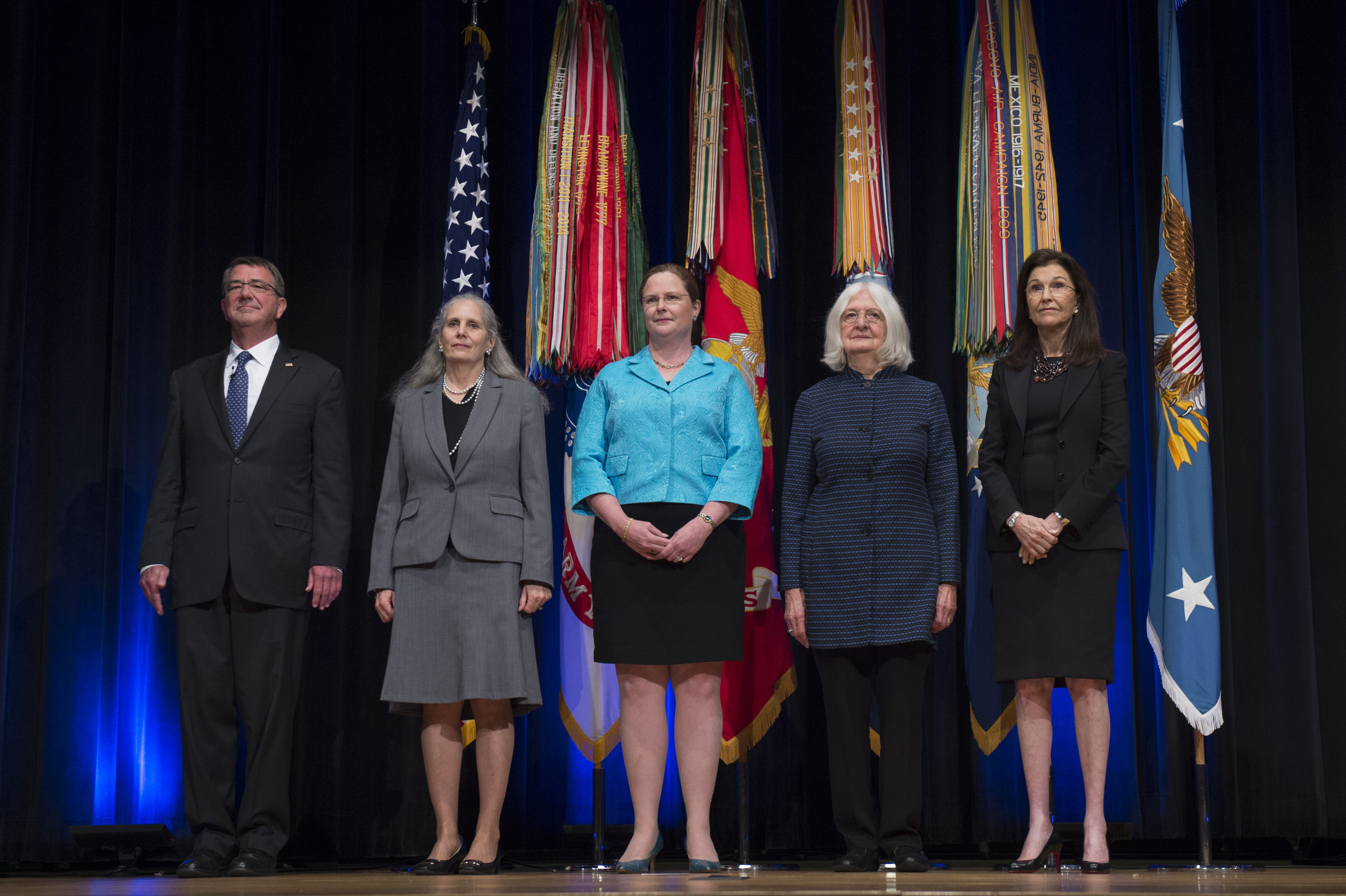
Secretary of Defense Ash Carter with 25th anniversary Nunn-Lugar Trailblazer Award recipients Dr. Gloria Duffy, Laura Holgate, Dr. Susan Koch and Jane Wales in 2016

In 2016, Holgate was confirmed as the United States ambassador to the United Nations International Organizations in Vienna. She was also America's representative at the International Atomic Energy Agency and the other significant UN offices in Vienna. During 2016 she was given a Nunn-Lugar Trailblazer Award for reducing the risk of nuclear war. The other recipients were Dr. Gloria Duffy, Dr. Susan Koch and Ms. Jane Wales. She served until January 2017.

From 2017 to 2021, she was vice president for Materials Management at the Washington-based Nuclear Threat Initiative. In November 2018 she introduced the ideas of International Gender Champions into nuclear policy.

=== Biden administration ===
On July 27, 2021, President Joe Biden announced the nomination of Holgate to serve again as the United States Ambassador to the United Nations International Organizations in Vienna. Her nominations to the United Nations Office at Vienna and to the International Atomic Energy Agency were sent to the Senate the following day. Hearings on her nominations were held before the Senate Foreign Relations Committee on September 30, 2021. The committee reported the nominations favorably on October 19, 2021. The United States Senate confirmed the nomination to the United Nations Office at Vienna on December 18, 2021, by voice vote. On February 1, 2022, she presented her credentials to Ghada Fathi Waly, Director-General of the United Nations Office at Vienna. Holgate's nomination to the IAEA expired at the end of the year and was returned to President Biden on January 3, 2022.

Holgate's nomination was resent the following day. The committee favorably reported the nomination on January 12, 2022. On March 29, 2022, the Senate confirmed the nomination to the International Atomic Energy Agency by voice vote. She presented her credentials to Rafael Grossi, Director-General of the International Atomic Energy Agency, on April 8, 2022.
