= Susan Koch =

American nuclear reduction expert (born 1943)

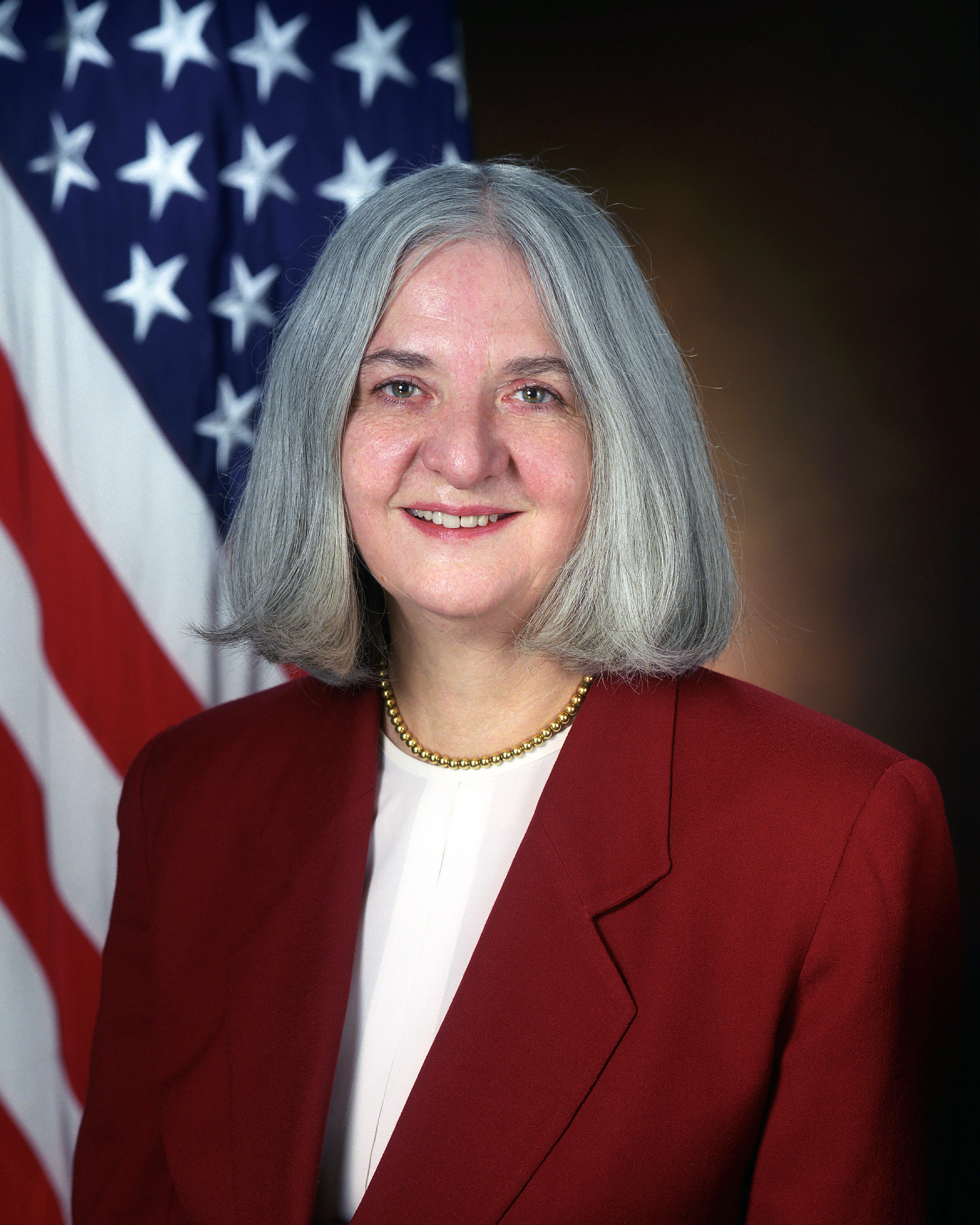
- Born: January 24, 1943 (age 83); Bridgeport, Connecticut
- Education: Mount Holyoke College and Harvard University
- Occupation: advisor
- Known for: US nuclear reduction expert

Susan Jane Koch (born January 24, 1943) is an American nuclear reduction expert. She has five medals from the Department of Defense, a Presidential Meritorious Executive Award and she was one of five people who were given inaugural Department of Defense Nunn-Lugar Trailblazer Awards in 2016.

== Life ==
Born in Bridgeport, Connecticut, Koch gained a B.A. degree in 1964 at Mount Holyoke College before she took an M.A. degree in 1968 and doctorate in 1971 at Harvard University in Political Science.

Koch first worked for the government at the Central Intelligence Agency where she looked at West European politics. In 1982 she took up senior positions in government which she held until 2007. She became an expert in arms reduction and non proliferation.

In 2012 she wrote a report on the American nuclear initiatives in 1991-1992. This was a historic year as in September 1991 the American strategic bombers that had stood fuelled and crewed since 1957 stood down. Dick Cheney had signed an order that allowed the bombers to stand down from that state of readiness. They did not resume.

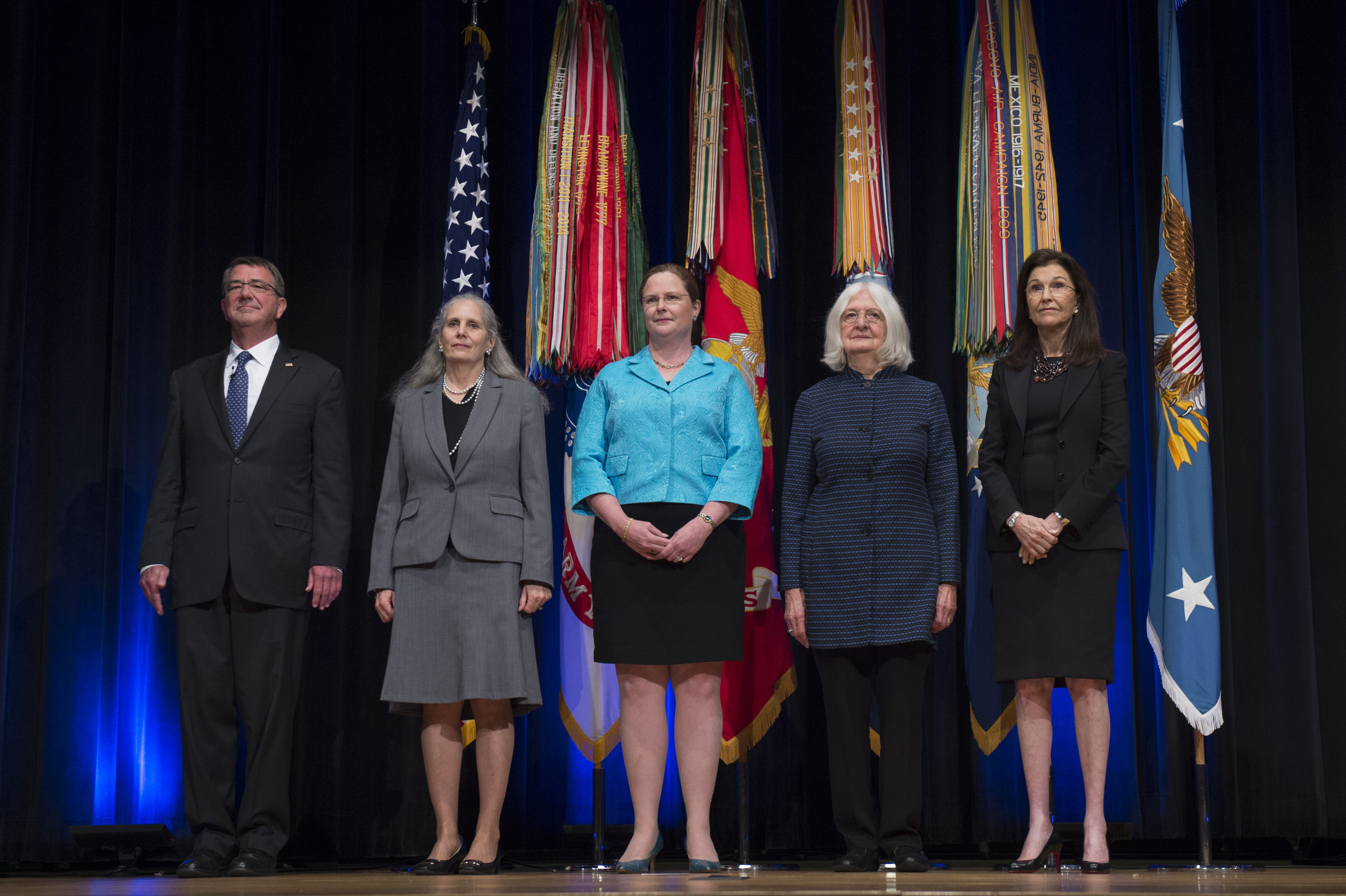
Secretary of Defense Ash Carter with 25th anniversary with four of the Nunn-Lugar Trailblazer Award recipients Dr. Gloria Duffy, Laura Holgate, Dr. Susan Koch and Jane Wales in 2016

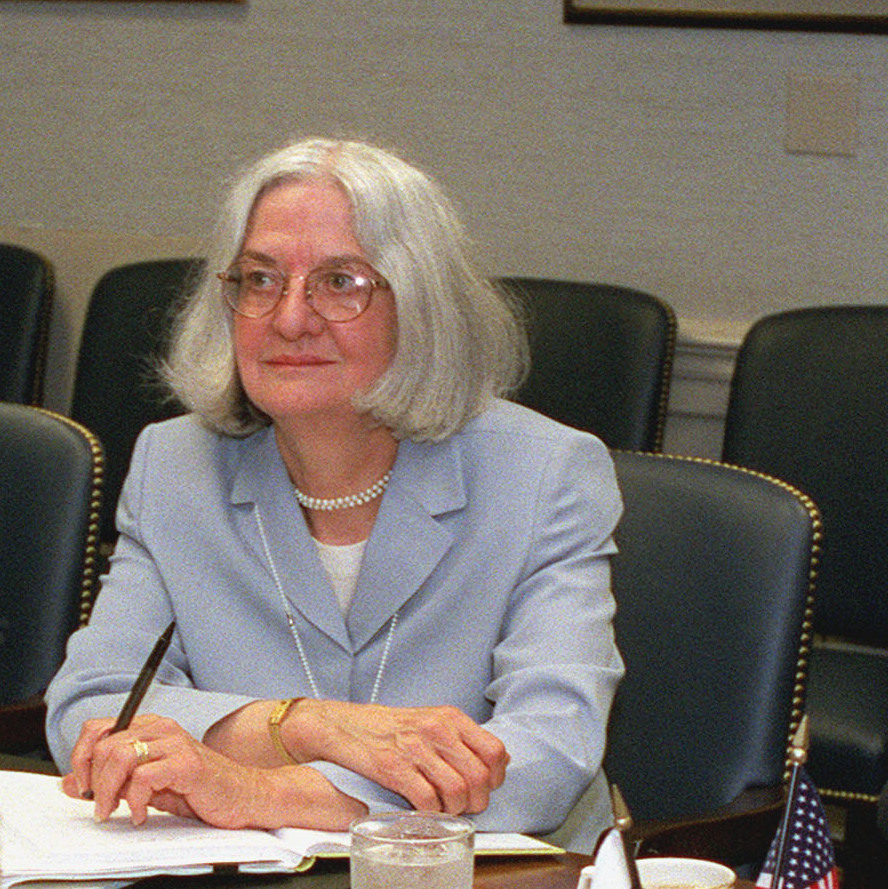
Dr. Susan Koch participating in a meeting on strategic stability held at the Pentagon, June 20, 2001, aimed at resolving Russia's objections to the U.S. plan to develop defenses against a limited ballistic missile attack.

In 2016 she was one of five people who were given inaugural Department of Defense Nunn-Lugar Trailblazer Award in 2016. The others were Dr. Gloria Duffy, Laura Holgate, Jane Wales and Elizabeth Sherwood-Randall (not in photo).

== Publication ==
- The Presidential Nuclear Initiatives of 1991-1992 CSWMD Case Study Series 5, September 2012.
- Manage Proliferation Security Initiative: Origins and Evolution CSWMD Occasional Paper, No. 9, June 2012.

== Awards ==
- Presidential Distinguished Executive Award
- Presidential Meritorious Executive Award
- Department of Defense Distinguished Civilian Service Medal (five times)
- Department of Defense Nunn-Lugar Trailblazer Award
- Arms Control and Disarmament Agency Distinguished Honor Award
- Department of State Meritorious Honor Award
