= Jackie Wolcott =

American diplomat

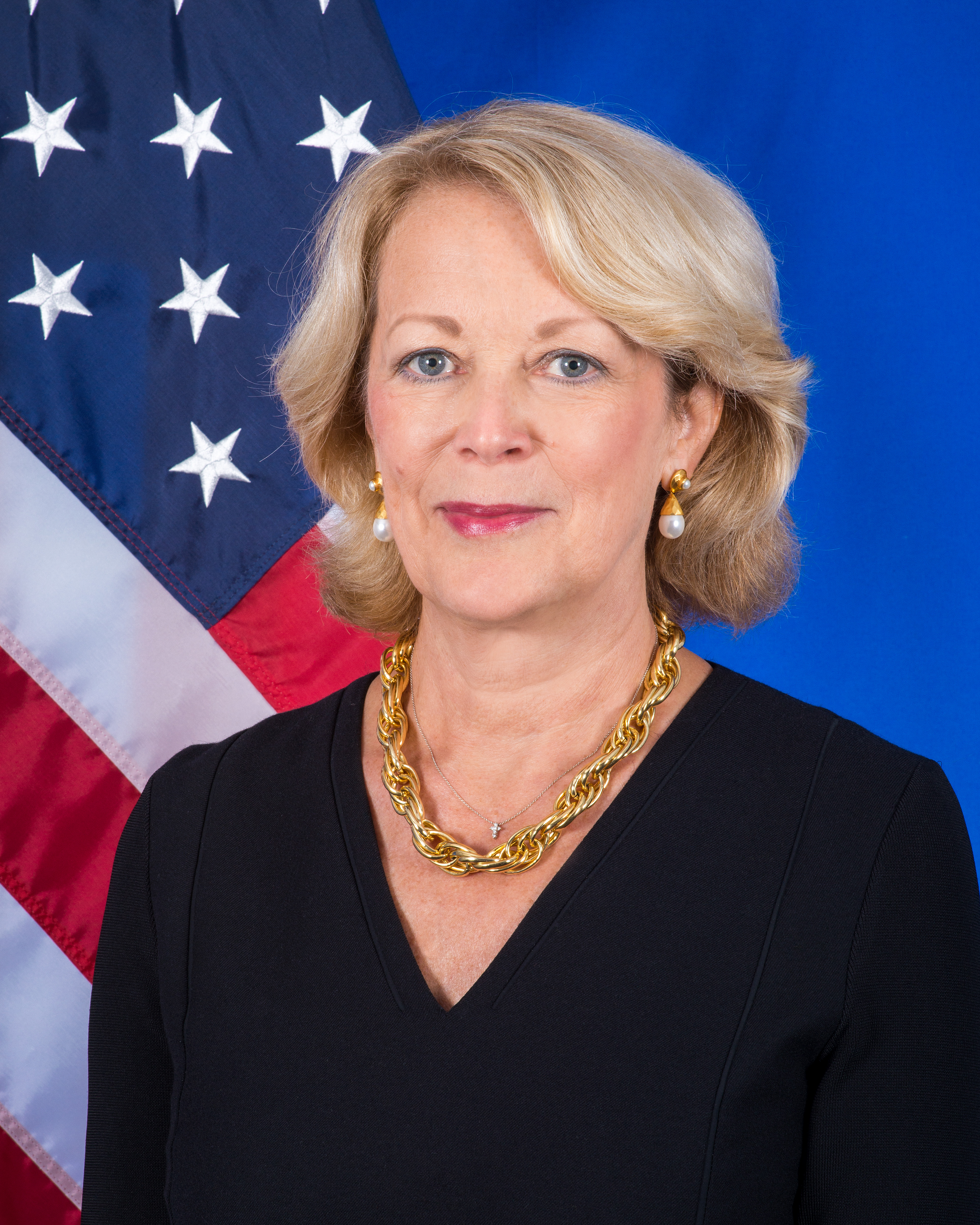

10th United States Ambassador to the United Nations International Organizations in Vienna
- In office October 23, 2018 – January 18, 2021
- President: Donald Trump
- Preceded by: Laura Holgate
- Succeeded by: Laura Holgate

Personal details
- Education: Bowling Green State University
- Profession: diplomat, civil servant

Jackie Wolcott Sanders is an American diplomat.

== Early life ==
Wolcott grew up in Martin, Ottawa County, Ohio. She graduated from Genoa Area High School in 1972, and went on to study at Bowling Green State University.

== Career ==
Wolcott has had a diplomatic career, working in national security and foreign policy.

Wolcott was appointed as United States Ambassador to the United Nations International Organizations in Vienna in October 2018, after being confirmed by the United States Senate on September 24, 2018. She completed her assignment and permanently departed her post at USUNVIE on Monday, January 18, 2021, two days before the inauguration of President Joe Biden.

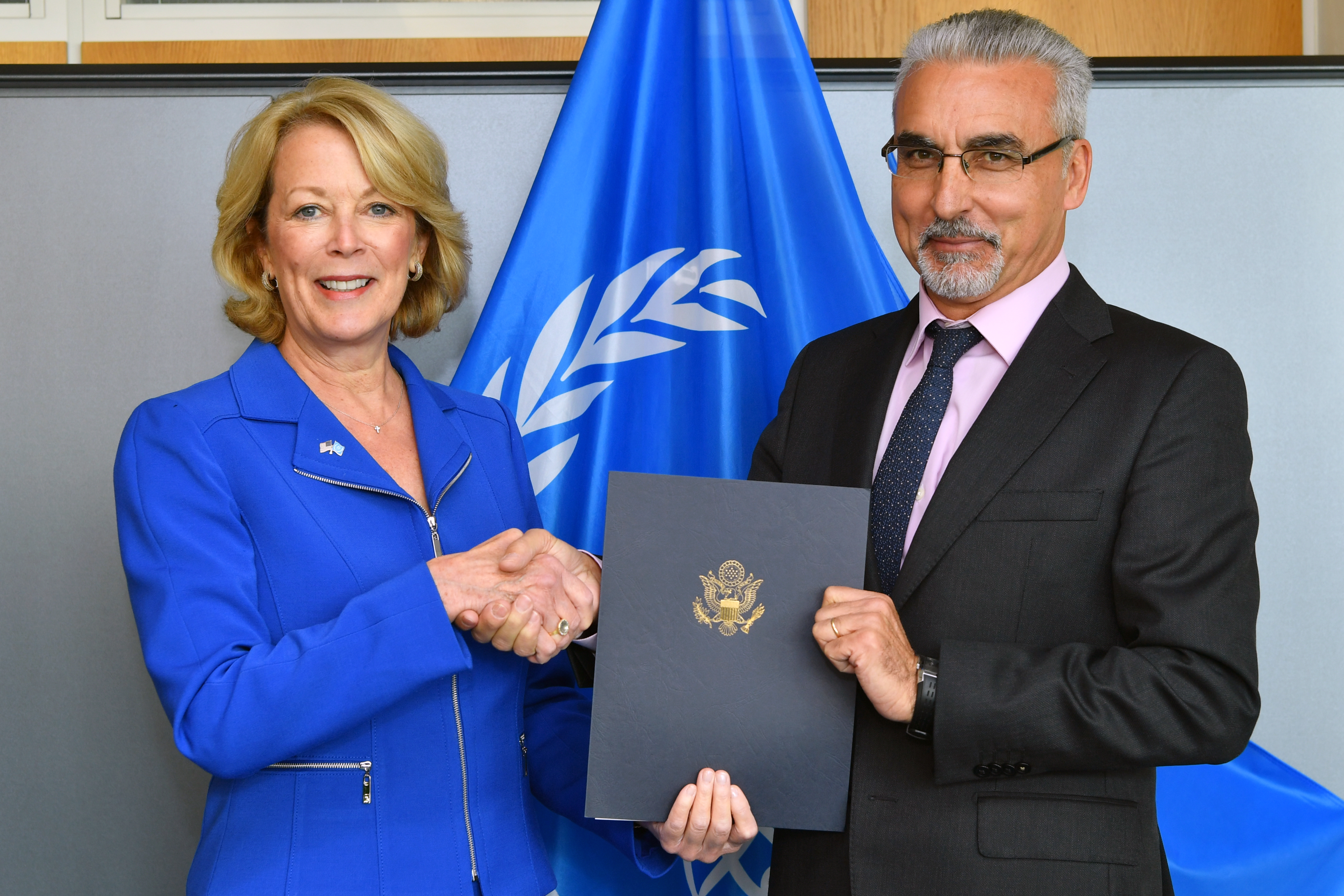
Wolcott with Acting Director General of IAEA Juan Carlos Lentijo
