= Gift basket diplomacy =

Gift basket diplomacy is an approach to multilateral negotiation aimed at pushing forward progress on a particular issue without the requirement of consensus. The policy is most often seen in United Nations style diplomatic meetings where a particular group of countries wishes to take action or make a joint statement but is unable to do so without the consensus of all parties involved. Gift basket diplomacy fundamentally is collective action agreed by smaller groups of participants that goes beyond the lowest common denominator consensus that larger groups often reach in large multilateral fora. The United States first introduced Gift basket diplomacy in 2011 during the Nuclear Security Summit preparation process and more than 30 countries participated in fourteen Gift basket diplomacy statements at the 2012 Nuclear Security Summit in Seoul.

== Introduction ==
Gift basket diplomacy is an attempt to solve the "lowest common denominator" problem of multilateral diplomacy. In United Nations style fora when countries issue a communiqué, or statement about their activities, a common process is for all countries to agree in consensus to the precise wording of a document or some output that characterizes their discussion. For issues with large numbers of countries, it becomes difficult to build complete consensus on a document without most countries having to give up much of the language they had proposed. This process leads to a series of scaled-back drafts where countries adjust their language to ever weaker positions in order to negotiate consensus. It is not uncommon for countries to be disappointed in a final communiqué because they had to discard much of their language in order to appease other countries with significantly opposing views. The result often is a communiqué document with heavily caveated with hedged language that provides ample wiggle room so that participants can justify not following through on commitments. Gift basket diplomacy attempts to circumvent the need for consensus by seeking out like-minded parties who support similar language in a document and agreeing among these smaller groups to particular language or negotiating position. These smaller groups often more quickly finalize negotiations amongst themselves and issue a joint statement on their own without the consensus or agreement of the larger group. The result usually is much stronger language or pledges for more concrete action with fewer caveats.

== History ==
The United States first implemented Gift basket diplomacy in the Nuclear Security Summit process between the 2010 Nuclear Security Summit and 2012 Nuclear Security Summit. National Security Council (NSC) Director for Nuclear Threat Reduction Shawn Gallagher is credited with conceiving and first proposing Gift basket diplomacy while NSC Senior Director for WMD Terrorism and Threat Reduction Laura Holgate and White House WMD Czar Gary Samore are credited with first implementing the policy. To overcome the continued watering down of the draft Communiqué in negotiations between the 58 participants in the Seoul Summit, the United States adopted a negotiating strategy of working in smaller groups to agree on concrete actions that countries felt their leaders could pledge to take together at the Seoul Summit. The United States proposed that smaller groups agree to collective action at preparatory Sherpa Meetings in 2011 and 2012 with the aim of these groups issuing Gift basket diplomacy statements at the 2012 Nuclear Security Summit in Seoul.

== Etymology ==
The origin of the “Gift basket” terminology is rooted in the use of “House Gifts” in the 2010 Washington Nuclear Security Summit. During preparatory meetings for the 2010 Summit, countries pledged a series of actions they intended to take to improve nuclear security. These actions became collegially known as “House Gifts” that each head of state would give to the world as they gathered to discuss nuclear security. Gift baskets are an extension of house gifts in the sense that they are groupings of similar commitments presented as collective action.

== Subsequent use of term ==
After the United States’ proposals for these collective action Gift baskets, several other countries initiated Gift basket diplomacy processes. In the preparatory Sherpa Meetings Germany, Indonesia, the Netherlands, Japan, Jordan, South Korea and the United Kingdom, also initiated Gift basket diplomacy processes and led smaller groups on particular subjects of interest to their countries. As a result, during the Seoul Summit, participating countries released fourteen Gift basket diplomacy joint statements.

- Activity and Cooperation to Counter Nuclear Smuggling (19 countries)
- Belgium-Netherlands-France-United States Joint Statement: Minimization of HEU and the Reliable Supply of Medical Isotopes (4 countries)
- Contributions of the GICNT on Enhancing Nuclear Security (6 countries)
- Joint Statement by the United States, Chile, Poland, Nigeria, Morocco, Thailand, and the Republic of Korea on the Nuclear Security Summit Outreach Efforts (7 countries)
- Joint Statement on National Legislation Implementation Kit on Nuclear Security (18 countries)
- Joint Statement on Nuclear Terrorism (3 countries)
- Joint Statement on Nuclear Training Centers (23 countries)
- Joint Statement on Quadrilateral Cooperation on High-Density Low-Enriched Uranium Fuel Production (4 countries)
- Joint Statement on Transport Security (5 countries)
- Nuclear Security Summit, Seoul, March 2012: Statement on Nuclear Information Security (31 countries)
- Republic of Korea, Vietnam, and IAEA to Pilot Radioactive Source Tracking System (2 countries and 1 international organization)
- Security of Radioactive Sources (23 countries)
- Trilateral Cooperation at the Former Semipalatinsk Test Site (3 countries)
- 2012 Nuclear Security Summit Deliverable: Global Partnership Against the Spread of Weapons and Materials of Mass Destruction (24 countries)

Countries are preparing new Gift baskets for the 2014 Nuclear Security Summit in The Hague. For example, The Netherlands hosted an “NSS Gift basket” event on 22 January 2014 to discuss a nuclear forensics Gift basket. and the Netherlands, South Korea, and the United States reportedly are preparing a “Strengthening Nuclear Security” Gift basket.

== Criticisms ==
The implementation of Gift basket diplomacy is inconsistent as a relatively new approach. Although the theory is for smaller groups of countries to agree to a certain text and then offer the language to the entire set of participating countries for consideration; in practice that has worked in some but not all instances. Countries have criticized this diplomatic tactic as a way to exclude them from signing up to a statement they otherwise might have agreed to. When the document is not made available to all countries for possible participation, some countries may be seen in a negative light for not having signed the document. These countries argue that they never were given the opportunity.

A second criticism is that issuing Gift basket diplomacy statements breaks the consensus building process and ultimately devalues the efficacy of a truly united and complete set of countries. Some argue that this process undermines the value of a consensus communiqué because more focus is given to separate Gift basket diplomacy statements given their often stronger language with fewer caveats.
