= Nunn–Lugar Cooperative Threat Reduction =

US post-Soviet counterproliferation program

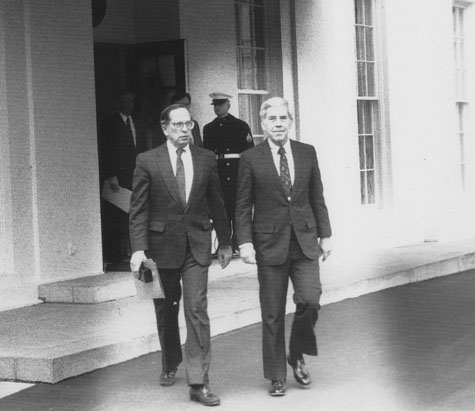
Senators Nunn and Lugar leave the White House in 1991 after briefing President George H. W. Bush on the Nunn–Lugar legislation

Cooperative Threat Reduction (CTR) is a counterproliferation program of the United States government, initially aimed at the post-Soviet states.

As the dissolution of the Soviet Union appeared imminent, the United States and their NATO allies grew concerned that Soviet weapons of mass destruction i.e. its nuclear, chemical, and biological weapons, would fall into the hands of adversarial states or terrorist groups.

The program was initiated by the Nunn–Lugar Act (Soviet Nuclear Threat Reduction Act of 1991), which was authored and cosponsored by senators Sam Nunn (D-GA) and Richard Lugar (R-IN). The purpose of the CTR Program was originally "to secure and dismantle weapons of mass destruction and their associated infrastructure in former Soviet Union states." By 2009, the program's remit had expanded beyond the former Soviet Union. The CTR program funds have been disbursed since 1997 by the Defense Threat Reduction Agency (DTRA).

The program facilitated, by 1996, the delivery to Russia of thousands of Soviet strategic nuclear weapons inherited by Belarus, Kazakhstan, and Ukraine, espoused in the 1992 Lisbon Protocol. In addition, the nuclear weapons delivery systems of those states, their intercontinental ballistic missiles, submarine-launched ballistic missiles, strategic bombers, and associated infrastructure were dismantled. Facilities of Russia's nuclear, biological, and chemical programs were either converted to peaceful use or given security upgrades, and 58,000 former weapons scientists were employed in peaceful work via the International Science and Technology Center.

== First 15 years ==
CTR provided funding and expertise for states in the former Soviet Union (including Russia, Ukraine, Georgia, Azerbaijan, Belarus, Uzbekistan, and Kazakhstan) to decommission nuclear, biological, and chemical weapon stockpiles, as agreed by the Soviet Union under disarmament treaties such as SALT I. This funding totaled $400 million a year for a total of four years. This $400 million was given to CTR-related defense programs. The Departments of Defense (DOD), Energy (DOE), state, and commerce were subject to distribute the funding. After the nuclear warheads were removed from their delivery vehicles by the post-Soviet successor militaries, Nunn-Lugar assistance provided equipment and supplies to destroy the missiles on which the warheads had been mounted, as well as the silos which had contained the missiles. The warheads themselves were then shipped to and destroyed in Russia, with the highly enriched uranium contained within made into commercial reactor fuel, which was purchased by the United States under a separate program. In recent years, the CTR program has expanded its mission from securing WMDs at the root source to protecting against WMD "on the move", by enhancing land and maritime border security in the former Soviet Union.

According to the CTR website in 2007, CTR had four key objectives:

- Dismantle former Soviet Union (FSU)'s weapons of mass destruction (WMD) and associated infrastructure
- Consolidate and secure FSU WMD and related technology and materials
- Increase transparency and encourage higher standards of conduct
- Support defense and military cooperation with the objective of preventing proliferation

These objectives were compartmentalized into three program areas which include:

- Destruction and dismantlement
- Safety, security and non-proliferation
- Demilitarization and defense conversion

These areas were then pursued and achieved through a variety of programs. Briefly, these include:

- The Cooperative Biological Engagement Program (CBEP; formerly the Biological Threat Reduction Program)
- Chemical Weapons Elimination Program
- Nuclear Weapons Storage Security Program (NWSS)
- Strategic Offensive Arms Elimination Program (SOAE)
- Weapons of Mass Destruction-Proliferation Prevention Initiative (WMD-PPI)

The CTR program is authorized by Title 22 of the United States Code, chapter 68a.

The FY 2007 CTR Annual Report to Congress provides a status update on the program as a whole and individual initiatives. It also details future planned endeavors in each area.

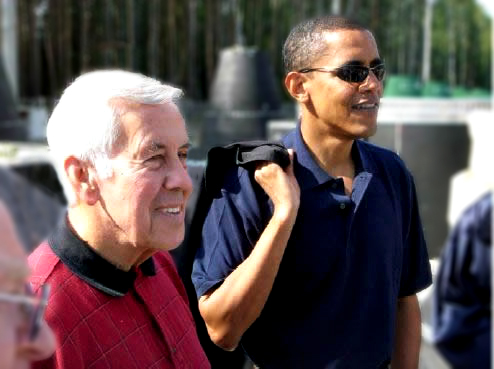
Senate Foreign Relations Committee Chairman Richard Lugar and Committee member Barack Obama at a base near Perm, Russia. This is where mobile launch missiles are being destroyed by the Nunn-Lugar program.

The Nunn-Lugar Act was a major contributor to de-escalation of nuclear weapon arsenals. This program was used for "the transportation, storage, safeguarding and destruction of nuclear and other weapons in the Soviet Union… and to assist in the prevention of weapons proliferation". One contribution by the Nunn-Lugar program has been the "delivery of equipment to accelerate the dismantlement of strategic nuclear delivery vehicles" to the Soviet Union. This program made important contributions in the disarmament of nuclear warheads in many counties. The Nunn-Lugar program eliminated former strategic weapons outside of Russia. This was most evident in the removal of these weapons in Ukraine, after the Budapest Memorandum on Security Assurances. There were many countries that had Soviet nuclear weapons. Two others included Belarus and Kazakhstan. Nunn-Lugar helped Russia to move the nuclear arsenals in these countries to Russia or to dismember these weapons in these countries. The US sent "nearly 700 emergency response items to help guarantee safe and secure transportation of nuclear weapons" to Belarus for the aid of the elimination of nuclear weapons in this country. The Nunn-Lugar Act played a major role in a huge decrease in the quantity of nuclear weapons that had been stockpiled during the nuclear escalation period.

Another important contribution was seen when the US sent storage containers to Russia to store fissionable material under Russian control. The US provided "10,000 fissile material storage containers by the end of 1995 and a total of nearly 33,000 containers by early 1997". These containers aided in Russia's ability to store nuclear material from dismantled warheads. Another contribution from the US to Russia was "$75 million dollars to help Russia build a new fissile material storage facility at Chelyabinsk for plutonium "pits" from dismantled warheads". The Nuclear Threat Reduction program was not just used to remove everything fissionable from Russia; it also included ideas for safe storage and transportation of fissionable material in Russia built up during the Cold War.

=== 20th century outcome ===
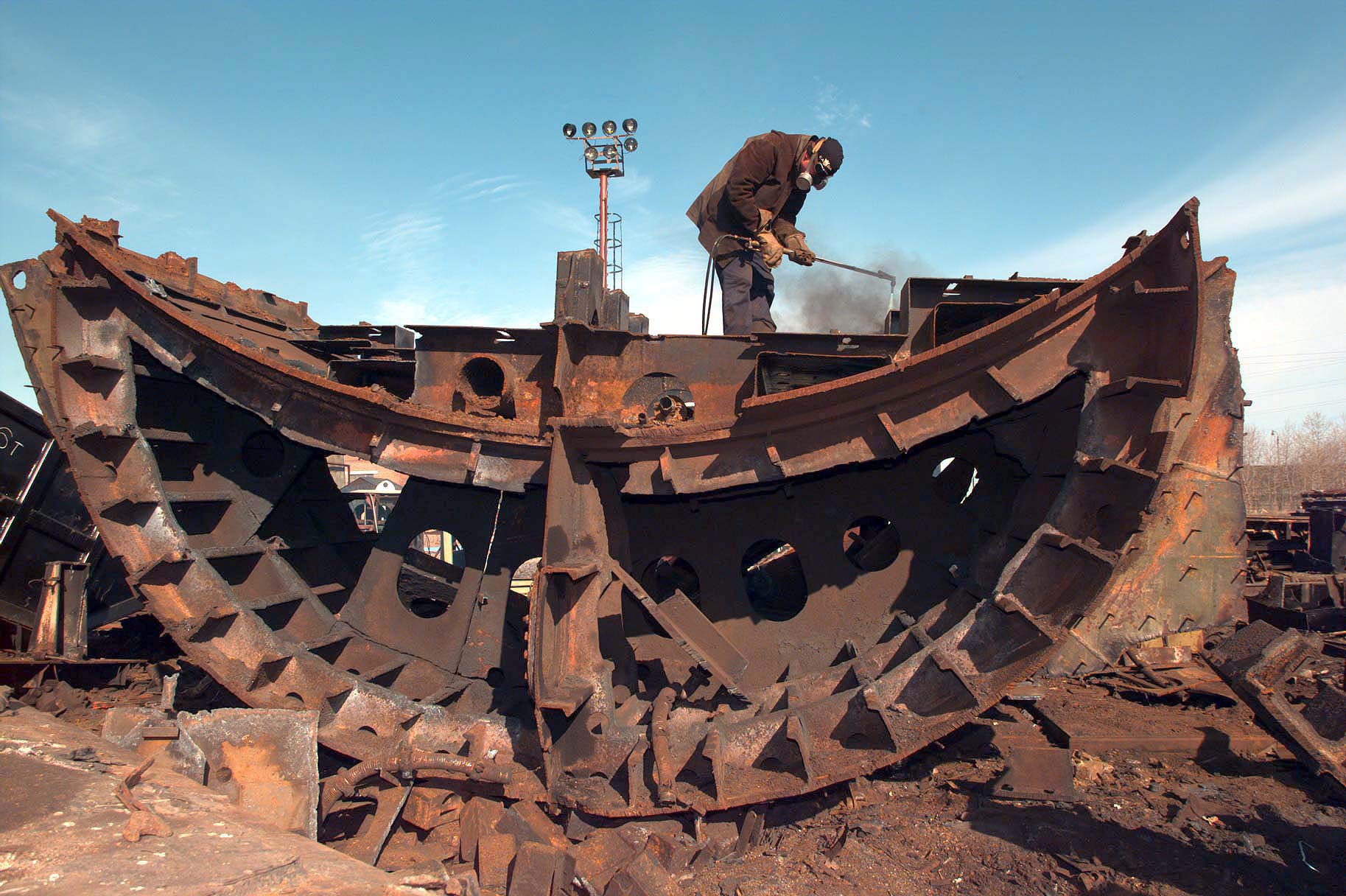
Disassembling of a Soviet Oscar-class submarine in Severodvinsk, 1996

Ukraine and Kazakhstan are nuclear weapons free in a small part because of this program. Under CTR, the U.S. and recipient states have made considerable advancements in global security against the threat of WMD. By 1997 all strategic Soviet nuclear weapons were removed from Belarus, Kazakhstan, and Ukraine marking an important landmark in the CTR initiative.

Weapons deactivated and destroyed under this program include:

- 537 ICBMs
- 459 ICBM silos
- 11 ICBM mobile missile launchers
- 128 bombers
- 708 nuclear air-to-surface missiles
- 408 submarine missile launchers
- 496 submarine-launched missiles
- 27 nuclear submarines
- 194 nuclear test tunnels

Other milestone results include:

- 260 tons of fissile material received security upgrades
- 60 nuclear warhead storage sites received security upgrades
- 35 percent of Russian chemical weapons received security upgrades
- 49 former biological weapons facilities were converted to joint U.S.–Russian research under what were known as the Biological Threat Reduction Integrating Contracts
- 4 biological weapons sites received security improvements
- 58,000 former weapons scientists employed in peaceful work through International Science and Technology Centers (ISTC)
- 750 projects involving 14,000 former weapons scientists and created some 580 new peaceful high-tech jobs; The International Proliferation Prevention Program has funded

One Nunn–Lugar site, Pavlograd, Ukraine, dedicated itself beginning in June 2004 to the decommissioning of nuclear missiles without burning their solid rocket fuel, thus preventing dioxins from threatening the local environment and human population. The Pavlograd missile factory PMZ has been converted to an advanced astronautics "Space Clipper" program.

== Expansion under Bush ==
Other countries are finding ways to produce, test, and acquire weapons of mass destruction. In an attempt to regulate WMD globally, the Nunn–Lugar Cooperative Threat Reduction has stepped outside of the former Soviet Union states. 2003 marked an important year for CTR expansion as the initiative was accepted by congress allowing the spread to countries not included within the prior Soviet Union. The Nunn-Lugar Expansion Act under the 108th congress granted up to $50 million to be used outside the former Soviet Union which focused primarily on Albania, North Korea, Iraq, and Libya.

Over time Nunn-Lugar has received many supporters and also many critics. Continuation and expansion has been up for debate since its initial formation in 1991. Proponents argue that the CTR does more good than harm which has led to funding expansion. This expansion of the program is displayed in the 1997 Defense Authorization Act whose purposed served in securing chemical and biological weapon materials. In contrast, opponents say that the US funding is going to other Russian programs. Going into the 21st century, efforts now have an expanded focus including a more generalized nuclear nonproliferation motive.

=== Libya ===
In 2003 Libya ended their nuclear weapons program and funding from Nunn-Lugar enabled secure transportation of nuclear materials from Libya to the United States.

=== Albania ===
Albania had possession of 16 tons of chemical weapons which were disclosed and disposed of through the Nunn-Lugar program. Nunn-Lugar funds in the year 2004, under the Bush presidency, were provided to eliminate all chemical weapons held within Albania which amounted to roughly $38.5 million. After just 3 years Albania no longer possessed chemical weapons of mass destruction.

=== Pakistan ===
After the 9/11 terrorist attacks, knowledge regarding Pakistani nuclear weaponry and nuclear scientists was unclear making it a strong candidate from American political leaders for Nunn-Lugar. Border crossing between Pakistan and Afghanistan militants made U.S. officials uneasy, this alongside the allegations of nuclear arms smuggling caused further talk of Nunn-Lugar program expansion in 2011. Senator Richard Lugar has expressed his concern regarding Pakistani nuclear weapons of mass destruction along with concerns over potential pathogenic and infectious disease security. Lugar also stated that if an outbreak occurs, if Pakistan accepts transparency with the CTR program, the U.S. will be able to provide aid and establish systems to combat an outbreak.

== Expansion under Obama ==
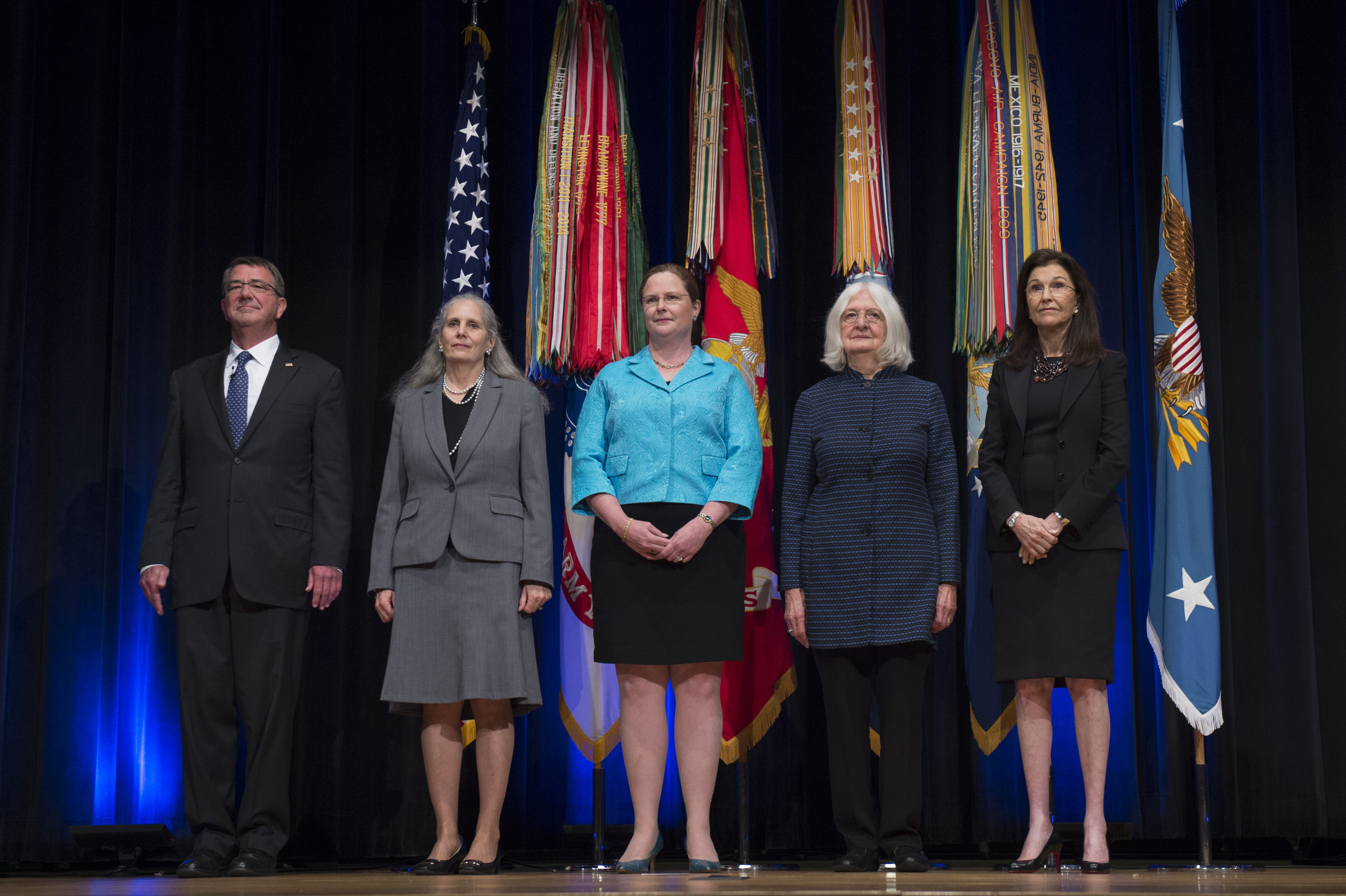
Secretary of Defense Ash Carter with 25th anniversary Nunn-Lugar Trailblazer Award recipients Dr. Gloria Duffy, Ms. Laura Holgate, Dr. Susan Koch and Ms. Jane Wales

Panel discussions on the 25th anniversary of the Nunn-Lugar Act, December 12, 2016
- Origins of Nunn-Lugar
- Implementation of Nunn-Lugar
- 25th anniversary of Nunn-Lugar, featuring former U.S. Senators Richard Lugar and Sam Nunn

Subsequent programs have built on the CTR, including the Proliferation Security Initiative, initially launched by President Bush in cooperation with Poland in 2003, and built on by multilateral efforts and then by President Obama.

In 2008 the DTRA awarded Black & Veatch the first of its Biological Threat Reduction Integrating Contracts (BTRIC). The five-year IDIQ contract has a collective ceiling of $4 billion among the five selected contractors. DTRA awarded BV the first BTRIC in Ukraine in 2008, which "is a vital part" of the CTR, entitled Biological Threat Reduction (BTR). The Implementing (Executive) Agents were three in number: the Ukraine Ministry of Health, Ukraine Academy of Agrarian Sciences and Ukraine State Committee for Veterinary Medicine.

In July 2008 President Medvedev signed the ratification law to cooperate in "the elimination of reduced strategic offensive weapons, improving the safety of storing and transporting nuclear weapons, improving the physical protection of nuclear materials and the destruction of chemical weapons," retroactive to the signature of the protocol on 16 June 2006 for a term of seven years.

In May 2009, Russia announced the opening of a major facility to decommission its chemical weapons reserves. Built near vast reserves of ex-Soviet weaponry at Shchuchye, Kurgan Oblast, in the Ural Mountains, the site is expected to destroy some 5,500 tons of chemical agents, including Sarin and VX. About one-third of the funding to build the plant, roughly $1 billion, was provided by CTR.

Although the budget for the CTR program has been cut every year since the Obama administration began, the US still faces many issues when it comes to agreements with Russia in nuclear arms reduction. President Obama had his own ideas for nuclear threat reduction. He and Hillary Clinton tried to reset nuclear relations with Russia. This included a plan to further reduce U.S. and Russian nuclear arsenals, which would further reduce the number of nuclear weapons in the world today. This plan was the result of the impending expiration of the Strategic Arms Reduction Treaty (START I). START was set to expire in December 2009.

In October 2012 the second Putin administration declared that Russia would not extend the CTR agreement without changes in the text.

On 14 June 2013 the US and Russia signed a new bilateral framework on cooperative threat reduction intended to supersede the first CTR. The new agreement was intended to reinforce the longstanding partnership on nonproliferation between these two nations and their activities in Russia and the Former Soviet Republics (FSR). "This new framework builds upon the success of the 1992 Agreement between the United States of America and the Russian Federation Concerning the Safe and Secure Transportation, Storage and Destruction of Weapons and the Prevention of Weapons Proliferation, commonly known as the Nunn-Lugar Cooperative Threat Reduction Umbrella Agreement that expires today. This new bilateral framework authorizes the United States and the Russian Federation to work in several areas of nonproliferation collaboration, including protecting, controlling, and accounting for nuclear materials." Under the new framework, Russia assumed the costs and the completion without further US assistance of two areas of bilateral CTR cooperation previously covered by the CTR framework: ballistic missile elimination and chemical weapons destruction.

In Obama's second term, work on nuclear threat reduction was said to be more bleak because of the Annexation of Crimea by the Russian Federation. Arms Control Today opined that "the crisis in Ukraine probably has ruined prospects for another formal Russian-U.S. arms control agreement during the Obama administration's second term." As far as reducing nuclear weapons in other countries, besides Ukraine, there is more of a chance of an agreement. This idea is explained in "countering nuclear weapons proliferation to states and to nonstate actors, the prospects are somewhat better, given mutual Russian and U.S. concerns in that area". There are still many agreements that have been proposed that can be passed between the US and Russia as far as nuclear weapons and the control and elimination of them are concerned. As time progresses, the threat of nuclear weapons and the money needed to spend on the elimination of them diminishes. The CTR program has faced many budget cuts since its beginning in 1986 because the program was, as opined by one observer, "created to deal with yesterday's strategic weapons and yesterday's threats have largely diminished".

In January 2015 Russian Federation representatives told their US counterparts that Russia would no longer accept US assistance in securing stored weapons-grade nuclear material but said they would continue the program on their own. Joint security work at numerous Russian sites and facilities was halted on 1 January 2015.

In December 2014, the program awarded a $4 million contract to MRIGlobal to "configure, equip, deploy and staff two quick response mobile laboratory systems (MLS) to support the ongoing Ebola outbreak in West Africa." The labs were deployed to Sierra Leone.

== Future plans ==
In 2018, David Franz and Libby Turpen co-chaired the National Academy of Sciences Committee on International Security and Arms Control to discuss the next ten years regarding the CTR program. The committee found that the Cooperative, or "C", in CTR was found to be central in reducing threats through transparency and action further strengthening world relations while mitigating dangers to the U.S. Sustainable partnerships between new and existing countries under the CTR is fundamental to the threat reduction program. The committee found the CTR program in 2018 still to be "foundational" in U.S. safety from WMD, even 30 years after the birth of the program.

== See also ==
- The World Institute for Nuclear Security
- Project Sapphire
- MPC&A
- Global Partnership Against the Spread of Weapons and Materials of Mass Destruction
- Russia and weapons of mass destruction
