= Agreement between the United States of America and the Russian Federation Concerning the Safe and Secure Transportation, Storage and Destruction of Weapons and the Prevention of Weapons Proliferation =

1992 Russia–United States arms control treaty

The Agreement between the United States of America and the Russian Federation Concerning the Safe and Secure Transportation, Storage and Destruction of Weapons and the Prevention of Weapons Proliferation (the Agreement) was instrumental for the release of funds pursuant to the Soviet Nuclear Threat Reduction Act of 1991. It was signed on 17 June 1992.

Version 53 of the April 2022 Congressional Research Service guide to "Arms Control and Nonproliferation: A Catalog of Treaties and Agreements" mentions this Agreement with the annotation that it "Provides for U.S. assistance to Russia for the safe and secure transportation, storage, and destruction of nuclear, chemical, and other weapons."

Under the terms of this agreement "the United States was the donor and Russia was the recipient of U.S. financial and technical assistance, including money provided to help Russia implement the reductions specified in START I."

This agreement was commonly known as the "Nunn-Lugar Cooperative Threat Reduction Umbrella Agreement", and it expired on 17 June 2013. This Agreement was replaced by the Framework Agreement on the Multilateral Nuclear Environmental Programme in the Russian Federation signed 14 June 2013.

American President George H. W. Bush and Russian President Boris Yeltsin signed the Agreement at their first summit on 16–17 June 1992 in Washington, D.C. The Agreement was signed on 17 June 1992 for a seven-year term and extended in 1999 until 15 June 2006.

== See also ==
- 1999 Agreement Between the Government of the United States of America and the Government of the Russian Federation Regarding Cooperation in the Area of Nuclear Material Physical Protection, Control, and Accounting
