= List of ambassadors of the United States to the United Nations International Organizations in Vienna =

Ambassador of the United States to the United Nations International Organizations in Vienna
- Seal of the United States Department of State

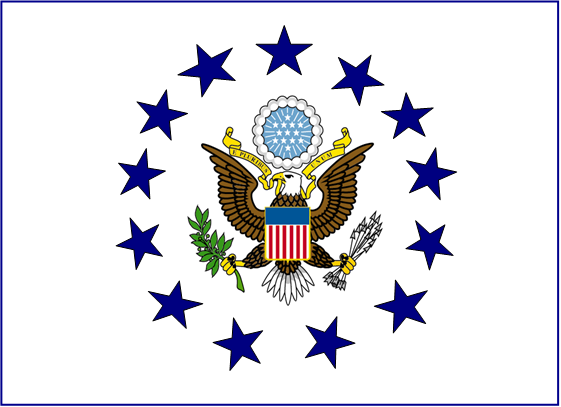
- Flag of a United States chief of mission

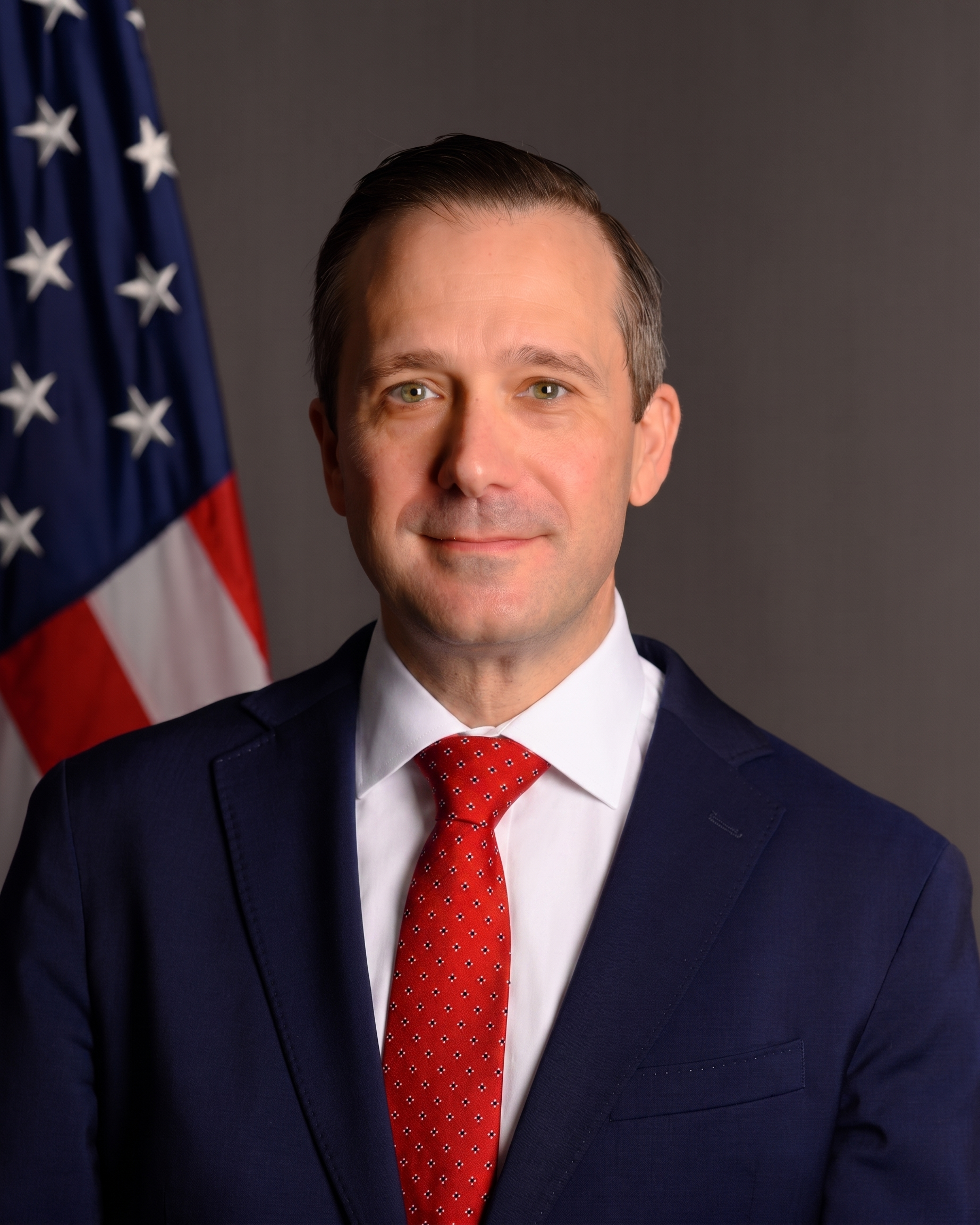
- Incumbent; Preston Wells Griffith III since September 3, 2026
- United States Department of State
- Nominator: President of the United States
- Inaugural holder: Richard S. Williamson as Representative
- Formation: 1983
- Website: U.S. Mission to the International Organizations in Vienna

The United States ambassador to the United Nations International Organizations in Vienna is the diplomatic representative of the United States to those organizations of the United Nations Office in Vienna.

Organizations include: the International Atomic Energy Agency, the Comprehensive Nuclear-Test-Ban Treaty Organization, the United Nations Office for Outer Space Affairs and the United Nations Office on Drugs and Crime, among others. The position is formally split into two permanent representative-level positions, titled United States Permanent Representative to the Vienna Office of the United Nations and United States Permanent Representative to the International Atomic Energy Agency, each of which requires a separate Senate confirmation. Because the representative holds the rank of an ambassador, they are commonly referred to by this title.

== Representatives ==
References from the State Department, unless otherwise indicated.

- Richard S. Williamson – Political appointee
  - Appointed: May 17, 1983
  - Terminated mission: January 15, 1985
- Bruce Chapman – Political appointee
  - Appointed: August 1, 1985
  - Terminated mission: October 16, 1988
- Michael H. Newlin – Career FSO
  - Appointed: August 12, 1988
  - Terminated mission: September 6, 1991
- John B. Ritch III – Political appointee
  - Appointed: November 22, 1993
  - Terminated mission: January 1, 2001
- Kenneth C. Brill – Career FSO
  - Appointed: October 1, 2001
  - Terminated mission: June 29, 2004
- Gregory Schulte – Political appointee
  - Appointed: June 29, 2005
  - Terminated mission: June 20, 2009
- Glyn T. Davies – Career FSO
  - Appointed: August 12, 2009
  - Terminated mission: November 30, 2011
- Joseph Macmanus – Career FSO
  - Appointed: September 27, 2012
  - Terminated mission: August 4, 2014
- Laura Holgate – Political appointee
  - Appointed: June 27, 2016
  - Presentation of Credentials: July 18, 2016
  - Termination of Mission: January 18, 2017
- Jackie Wolcott – Political appointee
  - Appointed: September 26, 2018
  - Presentation of Credentials: October 23, 2018
  - Termination of Mission: January 18, 2021
- Laura Holgate - Political appointee
  - Appointed (Vienna Office): December 18, 2021
  - Presentation of Credentials (Vienna Office): February 1, 2022
  - Appointed (IAEA): March 29, 2022
  - Presentation of Credentials (IAEA): April 8, 2022
  - Termination of Mission: January 20, 2025
- Preston Wells Griffith III Political appointee
  - Appointed (Vienna Office): August 7, 2026
  - Presentation of Credentials (Vienna Office): September 3, 2026
  - Appointed (IAEA): August 7, 2026
  - Presentation of Credentials (IAEA): September 5, 2026
  - Termination of Mission:
