= Jane Wales =

US executive who has worked for the White House

- Born: July 24, 1948 (age 77); New York
- Education: Emma Willard School, Sarah Lawrence College and Sorbonne Université
- Employer: various including the Clinton Administration

Jane Wales (born 1948) is an American non-profit executive, former US government official, and former foundation executive, who has served on the boards of directors of and founded many institutions. She is a Vice President of the Aspen Institute, and was the CEO of the World Affairs Council of Northern California for 20 years before resigning in 2019. She was also the founder and CEO of the Global Philanthropy Forum, She helped found the African Philanthropy Forum and the Brazilian Philanthropy Forum, and was the initial Executive Director of the Elders, founded by Nelson Mandella and Chaired by Archbishop Desmond Tutu. Moreover, she advises many philanthropists and is a member of the board of the Center for a New American Security. She serves as co-chair of the Generosity Commission. Her articles have appeared in The Guardian, the Stanford Social Science Review, Aspen Ideas Magazine and other publications. She is frequently interviewed on national security and economic development issues on television and public radio.

Wales previously hosted the NPR interview show and podcast "WorldAffairs", produced in association with KQED-FM and aired by participating NPR stations across the country. The show currently has rotating hosts, notably broadcast journalist Ray Suarez, formerly of the PBS NewsHour.

== Early life ==
Wales was born in New York City, and raised in Boston, upstate New York, and the US Virgin Islands. Wales graduated from the Emma Willard School and Sarah Lawrence College. She received her certificat from the Sorbonne in Paris. Her parents were the late Wellington (Duke) Wales, an editorial writer at the New York Times, and the late Helen Woolsey Wales, a literature professor. Wales’s brother Samuel died in 1966 while a sophomore at Harvard, and her elder brother Heathcote (Pete) died from complications from Amyotrophic lateral sclerosis (also known as ALS) in 2017, shortly after retiring from his position as a constitutional law professor at Georgetown.

== Career ==
From 1993 to 1996, Wales served in the Clinton Administration as Special Assistant to the President and Senior Director of the National Security Council. She served concurrently in a Senate-confirmed position as Associate Director for National Security and International Affairs at the White House Office of Science and Technology Policy. In her dual appointment, her responsibilities included policy development on issues ranging from the fate of nuclear weapons material in the former Soviet Union to the negotiation of bilateral science and technology agreements between the United States and emerging economies. She initiated and co-authored the US government’s first Science and Technology National Security Strategy. During the Carter Administration, Wales served as Deputy Assistant Secretary of State.

In the philanthropic world, Wales chaired the international security program at the Carnegie Corporation of New York, the W. Alton Jones Foundation and directed the Project on World Security at the Rockefeller Brothers’ Fund. Prior to that, she was National Executive Director of Physicians for Social Responsibility. Its international arm was awarded the 1985 Nobel Peace Prize during her tenure. As part of her work at the Carnegie Corporation she designed and convened the "cooperative security consortium" of scholars and former policy makers to develop a strategy for addressing the threat of nuclear weapons materials and technology in the successor states to the Soviet Union. Consortium findings and recommendations were the basis for the Soviet Threat Reduction Act (1991) sponsored by Senators Sam Nunn and Richard Lugar. The resulting "Cooperative Threat Reduction Program" became the policy of the US government.

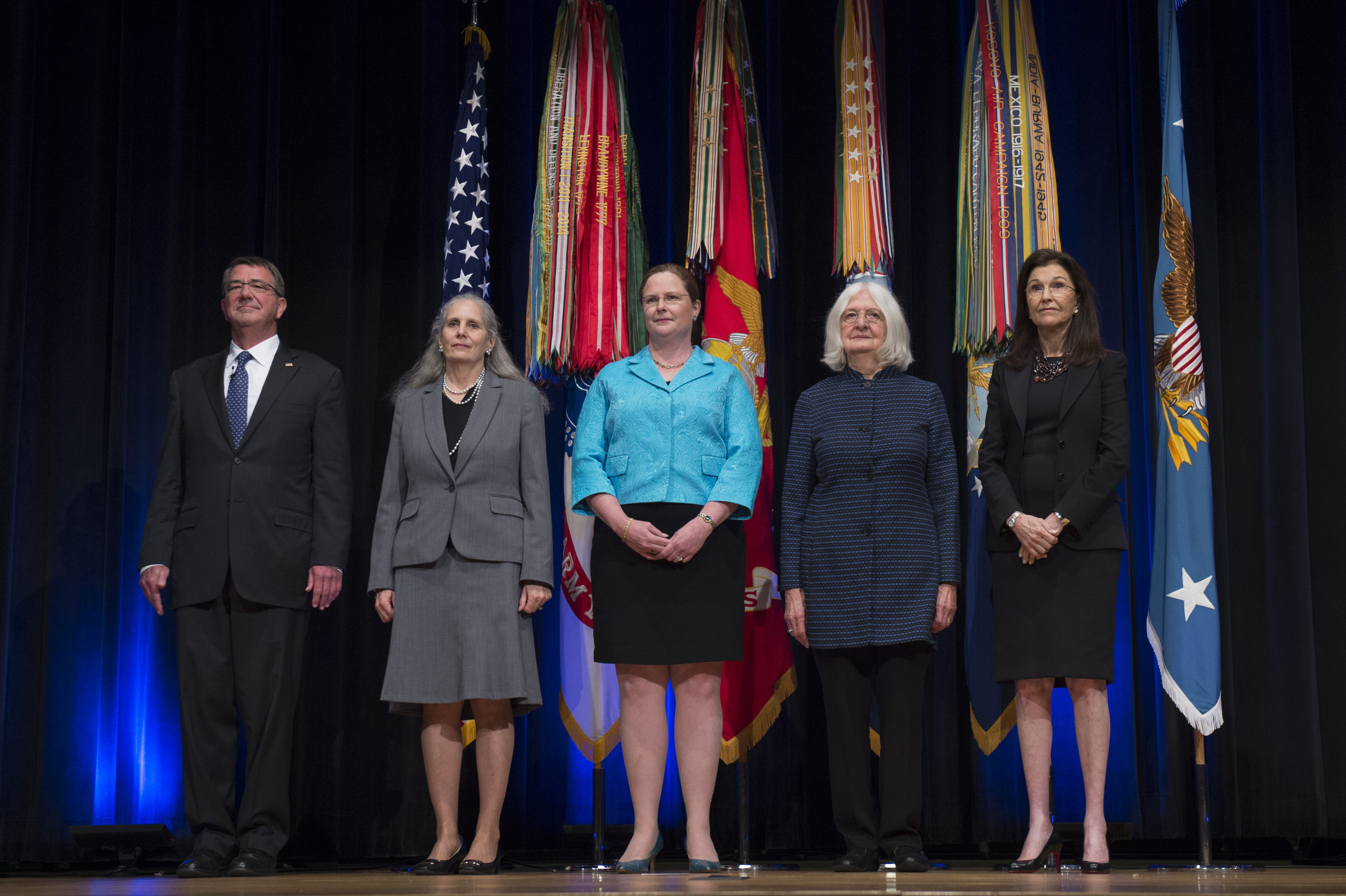
Secretary of Defense Ash Carter with 25th anniversary Nunn-Lugar Trailblazer Award recipients Dr. Gloria Duffy, Laura Holgate, Dr. Susan Koch and Jane Wales in 2016

As part of her work in broadcasting, Wales has conducted on-stage interviews with United Nations Secretaries-General Kofi Annan and Ban Ki-moon; former US Presidents William J. Clinton and Jimmy Carter; former Secretaries of State Hillary Clinton, Condoleezza Rice, John Kerry, and Madeleine Albright; former Secretaries of Defense William J. Perry, Ashton Carter, Robert Gates and Leon Panetta; former National Security Council Advisors Stephen Hadley and Anthony Lake; religious leaders Archbishop Desmond Tutu and the Dalai Lama; and heads of state ranging from British Prime Minister Tony Blair to Poland’s Lech Walesa to Liberian President Ellen Johnson-Sirleaf. She has also interviewed technology entrepreneurs, including Larry Page and Sergey Brin of Google; Sheryl Sandberg of Facebook; Reid Hoffman of LinkedIn; and Andy Grove of Intel. And she has interviewed such philanthropic leaders as Vartan Gregorian of the Carnegie Corporation of New York; Darren Walker of the Ford Foundation; Rajiv Shah of the Rockefeller Foundation; Julia Stasch of the John D. and Catherine T. MacArthur Foundation; Larry Kramer of the William and Flora Hewlett Foundation; Carol Larson of the David and Lucile Packard Foundation; Jeffrey Raikes, then of the Bill and Melinda Gates Foundation; and Stephen Heintz of the Rockefeller Brothers Fund.
