= World Affairs Council (Northern California) =

Chapter of an American non-profit organization

The World Affairs Council (Northern California), branding itself simply as World Affairs, is the Northern California chapter of the World Affairs Councils of America, a non-partisan and non-profit organization founded in 1918. It is located in San Francisco, California. The Council describes its mission as to "convene thought leaders, change makers, and engaged citizens to share ideas, learn from each other, and effect change in the belief that "Connecting people in this way leads to informed thinking, conversation, and actions that transcend traditional boundaries and lead to lasting solutions to global problems" and that solutions to the "world’s most challenging problems are found when the private, philanthropic, and public sectors work together." "Since its inception, it has valued thoughtful discourse and been committed to presenting a variety of views and opinions on topics bearing on global issues and providing in-depth analysis and rich context." Its CEO for 20 years was Jane Wales; she resigned in 2019, succeeded by Philip Yun.

In 2023, The Commonwealth Club merged with the San Francisco-based World Affairs; the organization adopted the name Commonwealth Club World Affairs of California.

== History ==
On its website, World Affairs traces its history to the 1947 UN Conference on International Organization in San Francisco, where the United Nations was founded. However, its deeper history traces back to the San Francisco Bay Region Division of the American Institute of Pacific Relations, a division of the Institute of Pacific Relations organization founded in 1925 for the purpose of furthering the mutual interests of Pacific rim nations and their citizens. Funding came largely from private businesses and philanthropies, especially the Rockefeller Foundation. The parent organization was in turn part of a larger network of groups with locations in Australia, Canada, France, Great Britain, Japan, the Netherlands, New Zealand, the Philippines, and the USSR. Officers during the 1944-1947 period included Ray Lyman Wilbur as Chair, Lynn White, Jr. as Executive Vice Chair, Mrs. Alfred McLaughlin and Robert G. Sproul as Vice Chairs, and Ernest B. Price and Eugene Staley as Executive Directors.

The San Francisco Bay Region IPR assisted the American IPR division conducted many activities similar to World Affairs today, conducting research in local and national issues (with a special focus on the Pacific Rim area) and carrying out meetings, conferences, and seminars for teachers In 1946, it had 400 members and was producing several regular publications.

The San Francisco Bay Region IPR was formally dissolved in June 1947 when it united with other groups to form the World Affairs Council of Northern California, a member chapter of the World Affairs Councils of America.

Its headquarters on Sutter Street, part of the Union Square district of San Francisco, were built in 1909, and feature a total of 51,150 square feet.

== Programs and events ==
World Affairs organizes a number of events geared toward providing educational opportunities focused on international affairs. It notably hosts regular lecture/interviews open to members and the public and featuring speakers that are experts in their fields of endeavor such as ambassadors, foreign dignitaries, corporate leaders and higher education professors with expertise in current national and international issues. Speakers have included Bill Clinton, former Polish labor leader and President Lech Wałęsa, former US Senator and CIA chief Leon Panetta, Pulitzer Prize-winning author and former UN Ambassador Samantha Power, Jordan's Queen Rania Al Abdullah, South African anti-Apartheid leader Bishop Desmond Tutu, former World Bank President Jim Yong Kim, journalist Nicholas Kristof, Grameen Bank founder and microcredit and microfinance pioneer Muhammad Yunus, conservative commentator David Brooks, economic historian Niall Ferguson, and many others. These sessions are recorded and produced in association with KQED-FM, and broadcast on participating public radio stations across the country as "World Affairs", as well as being available as a podcast. These seminars have rotating hosts, notably broadcast journalist Ray Suarez, formerly of the PBS NewsHour.
