= 1994 United States federal budget =

1994 Budget of the United States federal government
- Submitted by: Bill Clinton
- Submitted to: 103rd Congress
- Country: United States
- Total revenue: $1.26 trillion (actual); 17.5% of GDP (actual)
- Total expenditures: $1.46 trillion (actual); 20.3% of GDP (actual)
- Deficit: $203 billion (actual); 2.8% of GDP (actual)
- Debt: $4.643 trillion (at fiscal end); 64.5% of GDP
- GDP: $7.198 trillion

The 1993 United States federal budget is the United States federal budget to fund government operations for the fiscal year 1994, which was October 1993 – September 1994. This budget was the first federal budget submitted by Bill Clinton.

== Receipts ==
1994 Actual Receipts by Source
1. Individual income tax (43.0%)
2. Social Security/other payroll tax (36.5%)
3. Corporate income tax (11.1%)
4. Excise tax (4.30%)

(in billions of dollars)

Source	Actual
Individual income tax	543
Corporate income tax	140
Social Security and other payroll tax	461
Excise tax	55
Other miscellaneous receipts	58
Total	1,257

== Outlays ==
The total outlays for FY1994 was 1.46 trillion dollars as authorized by congress.

=== Deficit/Surplus ===
The budget had an estimated deficit for enacted legislation of $203 billion.
2.8% of GDP
