= 2002 United States federal budget =

2002 Budget of the United States federal government
- Submitted: April 9, 2001
- Submitted by: George W. Bush
- Submitted to: 107th Congress
- Country: United States
- Total revenue: $2.19 trillion (requested) $1.853 trillion (actual); 17.0% of GDP (actual)
- Total expenditures: $1.96 trillion (requested) $2.01 trillion (actual); 18.5% of GDP (actual)
- Deficit: $157.8 billion (actual); 1.5% of GDP (actual)
- Debt: $6.198 trillion (at fiscal end); 57.0% of GDP
- GDP: $10.877 trillion
- Website: Office of Management and Budget

The United States Federal Budget for Fiscal Year 2002, was a spending request by President George W. Bush to fund government operations for October 2001-September 2002. Figures shown in the spending request do not reflect the actual appropriations for Fiscal Year 2002, which must be authorized by Congress.

== Total Receipts ==
2002 Actual Receipts by Source
1. Individual income tax (46.3%)
2. Social Security/other payroll tax (37.8%)
3. Corporate income tax (7.99%)
4. Excise tax (3.61%)
5. Customs duties (1.00%)
6. Estate and gift taxes (1.43%)
7. Other miscellaneous receipts (1.83%)

(in billions of dollars)

Source	Requested	Actual
Individual income tax	1,079	858.3
Corporate income tax	219	148
Social Security and other payroll tax	726	700.7
Excise tax	74	67
Estate and gift taxes	29	26.5
Customs duties	23	18.6
Other miscellaneous receipts	43	33.9
Total	2,192	1,853

== Total Outlays ==
Outlays by budget function (in millions)

Function	Title	Actual
050	National Defense	$348,456
150	International Affairs	$22,315
250	General Science, Space and Technology	$20,734
270	Energy	$475
300	Natural Resources and Environment	$29,426
350	Agriculture	$21,965
370	Commerce and Housing Credit	$−407
400	Transportation	$61,833
450	Community and Regional Development	$12,981
500	Education, Training, Employment and Social Services	$70,566
550	Health	$196,497
570	Medicare	$230,855
600	Income Security	$312,720
650	Social Security	$455,980
700	Veterans Benefits and Services	$50,929
750	Administration of Justice	$35,061
800	General Government	$16,951
900	Net Interest	$170,949
920	Allowances	$-
950	Undistributed Offsetting Receipts	$−47,392
	Total	$2,010,894
