= Gary Samore =

American government official

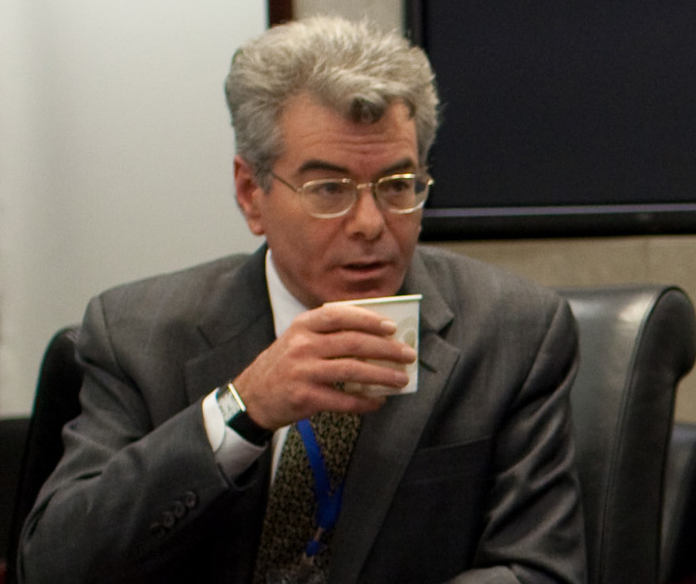

White House Coordinator for Arms Control and Weapons of Mass Destruction
- In office 2009–2013
- President: Barack Obama
- Preceded by: Office created
- Succeeded by: Elizabeth Sherwood-Randall

Gary Samore is the Crown Family Director of the Crown Center for Middle East Studies and Professor of the Practice in Politics at Brandeis University. He formerly served as the Executive Director for Research of the Belfer Center for Science and International Affairs at the John F. Kennedy School of Government at Harvard University.

From 2009 to 2013, he served as President Barack Obama's White House Coordinator for Arms Control and Weapons of Mass Destruction (WMD), commonly referred to as the WMD "czar". In the position, Samore "served as the principal advisor to the President on all matters relating to arms control and the prevention of weapons of mass destruction proliferation and WMD terrorism, and coordinated United States government activities, initiatives, and programs to prevent proliferation and WMD terrorism and promote international arms control efforts." He is credited with working with Laura Holgate, the NSC Senior Director for WMD Terrorism and Threat Reduction, to first implement Gift basket diplomacy.

From 1996 to 2000, Samore served as Special Assistant to President Bill Clinton and Senior Director for Nonproliferation and Export Controls at the National Security Council.

Samore is an Advisory Board member of the advocacy group United Against Nuclear Iran. He served as president of organization from September 2013 to August 2015. He is also an Advisory Board member of the Counter Extremism Project.

Samore received his MA and PhD in government from Harvard University in 1984.

== Gallery ==
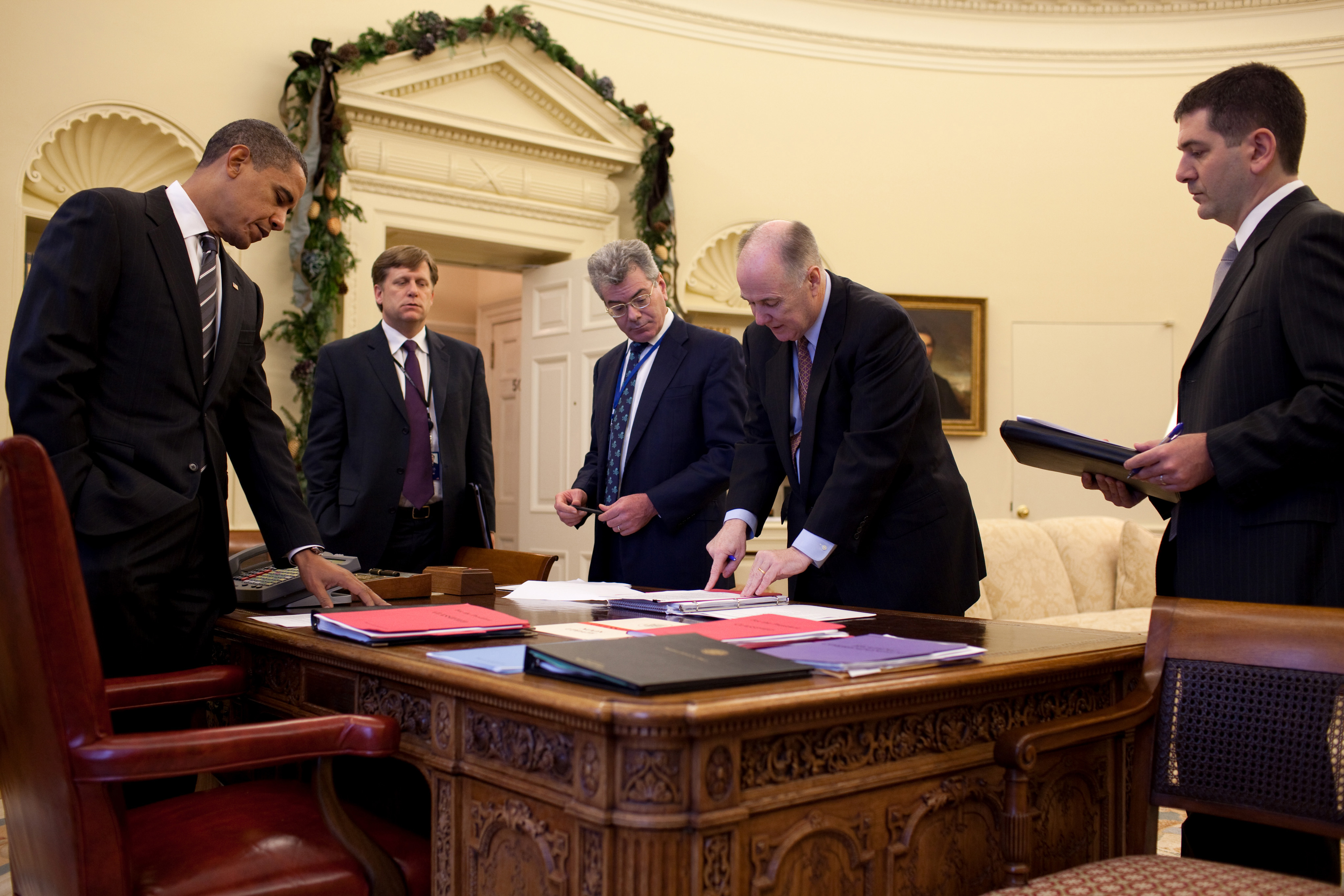
Samore attending a November 2009 Oval Office briefing

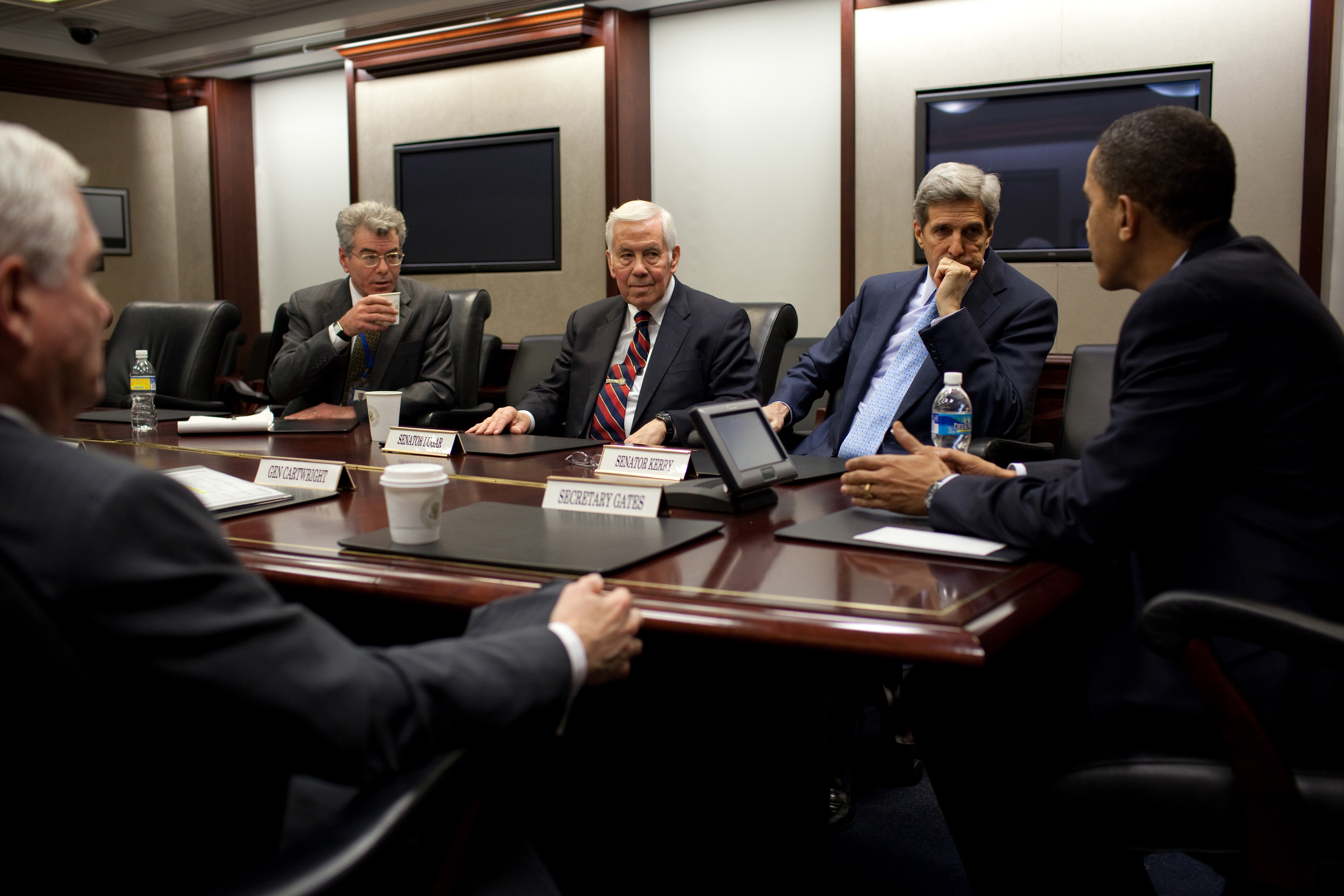
Samore in a December 2009 White House Situation Room meeting
