= Wardman Row =

- U.S. National Register of Historic Places
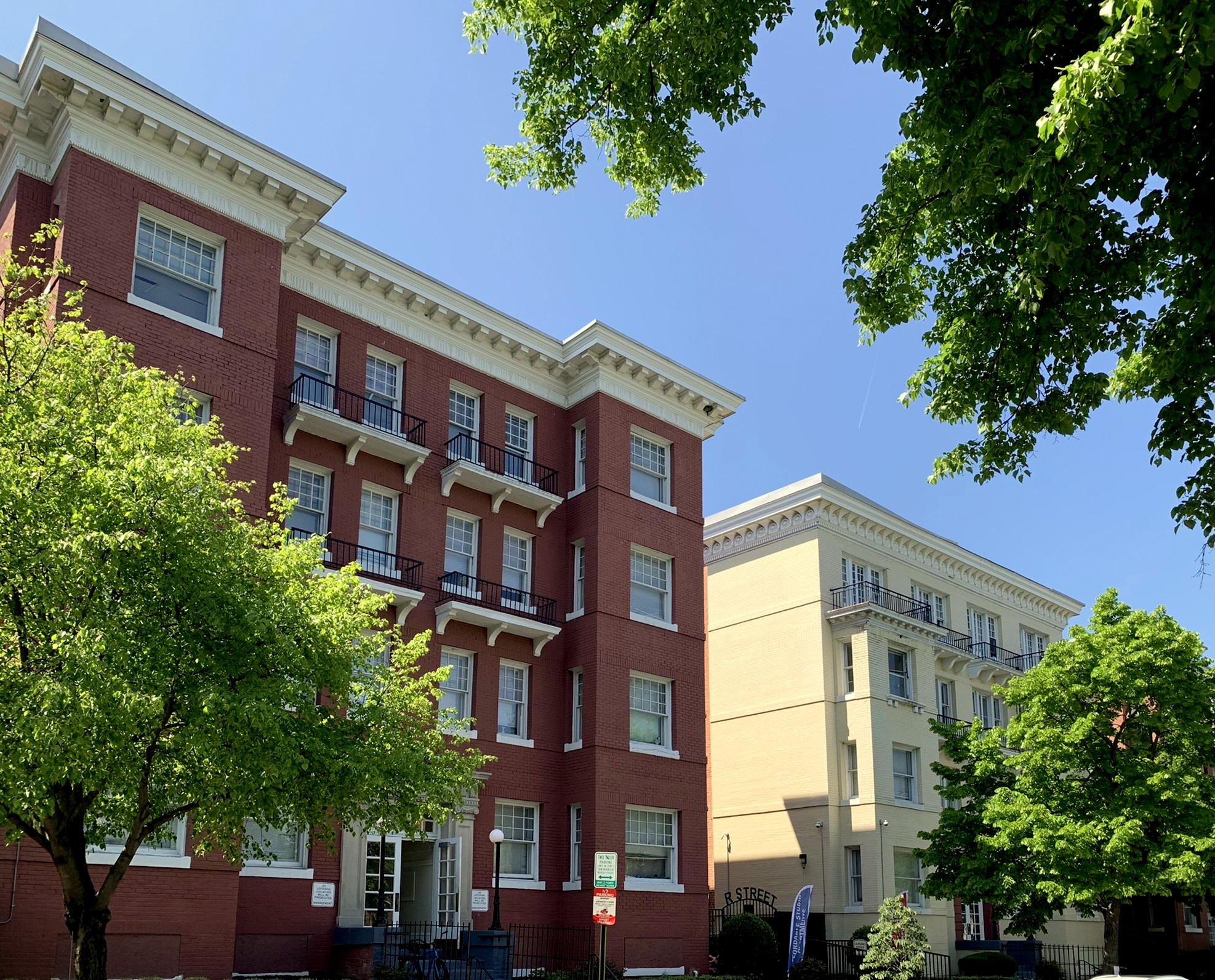
- Wardman Row in 2022

- Location within Central Washington, D.C. Location within the District of Columbia Location within the United States
- Location: 1416-1440 R St. NW, Washington, D.C.
- Coordinates: 38°54′44″N 77°2′2″W
- Area: 1.1 acres (0.45 ha)
- Built: 1911
- Architect: Albert Beers, Harry Wardman
- Architectural style: Classical Revival
- NRHP reference No.: 84000871
- Added to NRHP: July 27, 1984

Wardman Row is a block of historic apartment buildings at 1416-1440 R Street, NW in Washington, D.C. The buildings, located in the Greater Fourteenth Street Historic District were designed in 1911 by Harry Wardman and Albert Beers. In 1984, the buildings were placed on the National Register of Historic Places.

== See also ==
- National Register of Historic Places listings in Washington, D.C.
