= Soviet Nuclear Threat Reduction Act of 1991 =

United States law

- Long title: An Act to amend the Arms Export Control Act to authorize the President to transfer battle tanks, artillery pieces, and armored combat vehicles to member countries of the North Atlantic Treaty Organization in conjunction with implementation of the Treaty on Conventional Armed Forces in Europe.
- Nicknames: Conventional Forces in Europe Treaty Implementation Act of 1991
- Enacted by: the 102nd United States Congress
- Effective: 12 December 1991

Citations
- Public law: 102-228
- Statutes at Large: 105 Stat. 1691

Codification
- Titles amended: 22 U.S.C.: Foreign Relations and Intercourse
- U.S.C. sections created: 22 U.S.C. ch. 39, subch. IX §§ 2799, 2799a, 2799b, 2799c, 2799d
- U.S.C. sections amended: 22 U.S.C. ch. 35, subch. I § 2551; 22 U.S.C. ch. 35, subch. V § 2595 et seq.; 22 U.S.C. ch. 39, subch. I § 2751

Legislative history
- Introduced in the House as H.R. 3807 by Dante Fascell (D–FL) on November 19, 1991; Committee consideration by House Foreign Affairs; Passed the House on November 19, 1991 (agreed voice vote); Passed the Senate on November 25, 1991 (passed voice vote) with amendment; House agreed to Senate amendment on November 27, 1991 (agreed voice vote); Signed into law by President George H. W. Bush on December 12, 1991

Soviet Nuclear Threat Reduction Act of 1991, 22 U.S.C. § 2551, was chartered to amend the Arms Export Control Act enacting the transfer of Soviet military armaments and ordnances to NATO marking the conclusion of the Cold War. The Act sanctions the Soviet nuclear arsenal displacement shall be in conjunction with the implementation of the Treaty on Conventional Armed Forces in Europe. It funds the Nunn–Lugar Cooperative Threat Reduction program.

The United States legislation was passed by the 102nd Congress and enacted by U.S. President George H. W. Bush on 12 December 1991.

== Provisions of the Act ==
The Act was penned as four titles with the principal titles as Conventional Forces in Europe Treaty Implementation Act of 1991 and Soviet Nuclear Threat Reduction Act of 1991.

=== Title I : Conventional Forces in Europe Treaty Implementation Act of 1991 ===
Authority to transfer certain Conventional Forces in Europe treaty-limited equipment to NATO members

Chapter 9 Transfer of Certain CFE Treaty-Limited Equipment to NATO Members

Purpose of this chapter is to authorize the President to support, consistent with the CFE Treaty, a NATO equipment transfer program that will —

(1) Enhance NATO's forces
(2) Increase NATO standardization and interoperability
(3) Better distribute defense burdens within the NATO alliance

President may transfer to any NATO/Conventional Forces in Europe country, in accordance with NATO plans, defense articles —

(1) Battle tanks, armoured combat vehicles, or artillery included within the CFE Treaty's definition of conventional armaments and equipment limited by the Treaty
(2) As of the date of signature of the CFE Treaty, in the stocks of the Department of Defense and located in the CFE Treaty's area of application
(3) President determines military articles are not needed by United States military forces within the CFE Treaty's area of application

Notifications and Reports To Congress

(a) Not less than fifteen days before transferring any defense articles, the President shall notify the Committee on Foreign Affairs of the House of Representatives and the Committee on Foreign Relation of the Senate in accordance with the procedures applicable to reprogramming notifications pursuant to the Foreign Assistance Act of 1961.
(b) Not later than February 1 each year, the President shall submit to the Committee on Foreign Affairs and the Committee on Armed Services of the House of Representatives and the Committee on Foreign Relations and the Committee on Armed Services of the Senate an annual report.

(1) lists all transfers made to each recipient NATO/CFE country by the United States under during the preceding calendar year
(2) describes how those transfers further the purposes described in paragraphs (1) through (3) of the Chapter 9 Transfer of Certain CFE Treaty-Limited Equipment to NATO members
(3) lists, on a country-by-country basis, all transfers to another country of conventional armaments and equipment limited by the CFE Treaty

=== Title II : Soviet Weapons Destruction ===
Part A : Short Title

This title cited as the "Soviet Nuclear Threat Reduction Act of 1991"

Part B : Findings and Program Authority

(a) Findings
The 102nd U.S. Congress finds —

(1) Soviet President Mikhail Gorbachev has requested Western help in dismantling nuclear weapons, and President George H. W. Bush has proposed United States cooperation on the storage, transportation, dismantling, and destruction of Soviet nuclear weapons
(2) The profound changes underway in the Soviet Union pose three types of danger to nuclear safety and stability, as follows:

(A) Ultimate disposition of nuclear weapons among the Soviet Union, its republics, and any successor entities that is not conducive to weapons safety or to international stability
(B) Seizure, theft, sale, or use of nuclear weapons or components
(C) Transfers of weapons, weapons components, or weapons know-how outside of the territory of the Soviet Union, its republics, and any successor entities, that contribute to world-wide nuclear proliferation

(3) It is in the national security interests of the United States

(A) To facilitate on a priority basis the transportation, storage, safeguarding, and destruction of nuclear and other weapons in the Soviet Union, its republics, and any successor entities
(B) To assist in the prevention of weapons proliferation

(b) Exclusions
United States assistance in destroying nuclear and other weapons under this title may not be provided to the Soviet Union, any of its republics, or any successor entity unless the President certifies to the U.S. Congress that the proposed recipient is committed to the following;

(1) Making a substantial investment of its resources for dismantling or destroying such weapons
(2) Forgoing any military modernization program that exceeds legitimate defense requirements and forgoing the replacement of destroyed weapons of mass destruction
(3) Forgoing any use of fissionable and other components of destroyed nuclear weapons in new nuclear weapons
(4) Facilitating United States verification of weapons destruction carried out and complying with all relevant arms control agreements and observing internationally recognized human rights, including the protection of minorities

Authority for Program to Facilitate Soviet Weapons Destruction

(a) Notwithstanding any other provision of law, the President, consistent with the findings stated may establish a program as authorized to assist Soviet weapons destruction. Funds for carrying out this program shall be provided as specified in part C.
(b) The program shall be limited to cooperation among the United States, the Soviet Union, its republics, and any successor entities to;

(1) Destroy nuclear weapons, chemical weapons, and other weapons,
(2) Transport, store, disable, and safeguard weapons in connection with their destruction
(3) Establish verifiable safeguards against the proliferation of such weapons. Such cooperation may involve assistance in planning and in resolving technical problems associated with weapons destruction and proliferation. Such cooperation may also involve the funding of critical short-term requirements related to weapons destruction and should, to the extent feasible, draw upon United States technology and United States technicians.

Part C : Administrative and Funding Authorities

Administration of Nuclear Threat Reduction Programs

(a) Funding

(1) Transfer Authority
The President may, to the extent provided in an appropriations Act or joint resolution, transfer to the appropriate defense accounts from amounts appropriated to the Department of Defense for fiscal year 1992 for operation and maintenance or from balances in working capital accounts established, not to exceed $400,000,000 for use in reducing the Soviet military threat.
(2) Limitation
Amounts for transfers may not be derived from amounts appropriated for any activity of the Department of Defense that the Secretary of Defense determines essential for the readiness of the Armed Forces, including amounts for;

(A) Training activities
(B) Depot maintenance activities

Part D : Reporting Requirements

Prior Notice of Obligations to U.S. Congress

Not less than fifteen days before obligating any funds for a program, the President shall transmit to the U.S. Congress a report on the proposed obligation. Each report shall specify;
(1) The account, budget activity, and particular program or programs from which the funds proposed to be obligated are to be derived and the amount of the proposed obligation
(2) The activities and forms of assistance for which the President plans to obligate such funds

Quarterly Reports on Program

Not later than thirty days after the end of each quarter of fiscal years 1992 and 1993, the President shall transmit to the U.S. Congress a report on the activities to reduce the Soviet military threat. Each report shall set forth, for the preceding quarter and cumulatively, the following:
(1) Amounts spent for activities and the purposes for which they were spent
(2) The source of the funds obligated for activities, stated specifically by program
(3) A description of the participation of the Department of Defense, and the participation of any other United States Government department or agency, in such activities
(4) A description of the activities carried out and the forms of assistance provided
(5) Other information as the President considers appropriate to fully inform the U.S. Congress concerning the operation of the program

=== Title III : Emergency Airlift and Other Support ===
Authority to Transfer Certain Funds to Provide Emergency Airlift and Other Support

(a) Findings
The 102nd U.S. Congress finds —

(1) Political and economic conditions within the Soviet Union and its republics are unstable and are likely to remain so for the foreseeable future
(2) These conditions could lead to the return of anti-democratic forces in the Soviet Union
(3) That one of the most effective means of preventing such a situation is likely to be the immediate provision of humanitarian assistance

(a) That should this need arise, the United States should have funds readily available to provide for the transport of such assistance to the Soviet Union, its republics, and any successor entities
(b) Authority to transfer certain funds

(1) General
Notwithstanding any other provision of law, the Secretary of Defense, at the direction of the President, may during fiscal year 1992, to the extent provided in an appropriations Act or joint resolution, transfer to the appropriate defense accounts sufficient funds, not to exceed $100,000,000 in order to transport, by military or commercial means, food, medical supplies, and other types of humanitarian assistance to the Soviet Union, its republics, or any successor entities with the consent of the relevant republic government or independent successor entity in order to address emergency conditions which may arise in such republic or successor entity, determined by the President. The term "humanitarian assistance" does not include construction equipment, including tractors, scrapers, loaders, graders, bulldozers, dump trucks, generators, and compressors.

=== Title IV : Arms Control and Disarmament Act ===
Arms Control and Disarmament Agency

Arms Control and Disarmament Act of 1961 amended as mandated by Title IV : Arms Control and Disarmament Act

Arms Control and Disarmament Agency Revitalization — establish On-Site Inspection Agency to monitor the nuclear tests in pursuant to the Threshold Test Ban Treaty and the Peaceful Nuclear Explosions Treaty and the monitoring of the inspection provisions of additional arms control agreements as the President of the United States may direct.

== Subsequent developments ==
The subsequent developments listed here are a subset of the Belfer Center document entitled "Cooperative Threat Reduction Timeline".

- On 21 December 1991, the CIS held a summit in Alma-Ata Kazakhstan, at which Belarus, Kazakhstan, Russia and Ukraine signed the Agreement on Joint Measures on Nuclear Weapons, whereby Ukraine, Kazakhstan and Belarus pledge to withdraw all tactical nuclear weapons to Russia by 1 July 1992, and Ukraine and Belarus pledged to eliminate strategic nuclear weapons on their territories by 1994 and to join the international Treaty on the Non-Proliferation of Nuclear Weapons (NPT) as non-nuclear-weapons states. CIS members agree that Russia should succeed the USSR as permanent member of the UN Security Council.
- 17 June 1992 Agreement between the United States of America and the Russian Federation Concerning the Safe and Secure Transportation, Storage and Destruction of Weapons and the Prevention of Weapons Proliferation
- 2 October 1999 Agreement Between the Government of the United States of America and the Government of the Russian Federation Regarding Cooperation in the Area of Nuclear Material Physical Protection, Control, and Accounting
- 23 July 2008 law On the Ratification of the Protocols to the Agreement between the Russian Federation and the United States of America on the Safe and Secure Transportation, Storage and Destruction of Weapons and the Prevention of Weapons Proliferation of 17 June 1992, followed the protocol meeting of 16 June 2006. At the 2006 protocol meeting it was decided to extend the 1999 Agreement for seven years.

== See also ==
- Federation of American Scientists
- Former Soviet Union Demilitarization Act of 1992
- List of Soviet Union–United States summits
- National Museum of American Diplomacy
- New World Order
- Nuclear arms race
- Nuclear disarmament
- Nunn–Lugar Cooperative Threat Reduction
- Partnership for Peace
- Soviet Scientists Immigration Act of 1992
- START I
