= Donald K. Bandler =

American diplomat (1947–2017)

Donald Keith Bandler (April 1947 in Philadelphia, Pennsylvania – February 24, 2017) was the American ambassador extraordinary and plenipotentiary to Cyprus from 1999 to 2002.

Bandler attended Harriton High School and Kenyon College (class of 1969) before teaching at The Key School from 1969 to 1971 (he taught history to juniors and seniors). He earned an MA in Classics from St. John's College (Annapolis/Santa Fe) and a JD from George Washington University Law School in 1971.

== See also ==
- Donald Bandler '69 wins appointment as U.S. ambassador to Cyprus
