= Repression of science in the Soviet Union =

Sciences and research that were banned by the Soviet Union

Many fields of scientific research in the Soviet Union were banned or suppressed with various justifications. All humanities and social sciences were tested for strict accordance with dialectical materialism. These tests served as a cover for political suppression of scientists who engaged in research labeled as "idealistic" or "bourgeois". Many scientists were fired, others were arrested and sent to the Gulag. The suppression of scientific research began during the Stalin era and continued after his death.

The ideologically motivated persecution damaged many fields of Soviet science.

== Examples ==
=== Biology ===
In the mid-1930s, the agronomist Trofim Lysenko started a campaign against genetics and was supported by Stalin. If the field of genetics' connection to Nazis wasn't enough, Mendelian genetics was also suppressed due to beliefs that it was "bourgeoisie science" and its association with the priest Gregor Mendel due to hostility to religion because of the Soviet policy of state atheism.

In 1950, the Soviet government organized the Joint Scientific Session of the USSR Academy of Sciences and the USSR Academy of Medical Sciences, the "Pavlovian session". Several prominent Soviet physiologists (L.A. Orbeli, P.K. Anokhin, Aleksey Speransky, Ivane Beritashvili) were accused of deviating from Pavlov's teaching. As a consequence of the Pavlovian session, Soviet physiologists were forced to accept a dogmatic ideology; the quality of physiological research deteriorated and Soviet physiology excluded itself from the international scientific community. Later Soviet biologists heavily criticised Lysenko's theories and pseudo-scientific methods.

=== Cybernetics ===
Cybernetics was also outlawed as bourgeois pseudoscience during Stalin's reign. Norbert Wiener's 1948 book Cybernetics was condemned and translated only in 1958. A 1954 edition of the Brief Philosophical Dictionary condemned cybernetics for "mechanistically equating processes in live nature, society and in technical systems, and thus standing against materialistic dialectics and modern scientific physiology developed by Ivan Pavlov". (However this article was removed from the 1955 reprint of the dictionary.) After an initial period of doubts, Soviet cybernetics took root, but this early attitude hampered the development of computing in the Soviet Union.

=== History ===
Soviet historiography (the way in which history was and is written by scholars of the Soviet Union) was significantly influenced by the strict control by the authorities aimed at propaganda of communist ideology and Soviet power.

Since the late 1930s, Soviet historiography treated the party line and reality as one and the same. As such, if it was a science, it was a science in service of a specific political and ideological agenda, commonly employing historical negationist methods. In the 1930s, historic archives were closed and original research was severely restricted. Historians were required to pepper their works with references – appropriate or not – to Stalin and other "Marxist-Leninist classics", and to pass judgment – as prescribed by the Party – on pre-revolution historic Russian figures.

Many works of Western historians were forbidden or censored, many areas of history were also forbidden for research as, officially, they never happened. Translations of foreign historiography were often produced in a truncated form, accompanied with extensive censorship and corrective footnotes. For example, in the Russian 1976 translation of Basil Liddell Hart's History of the Second World War pre-war purges of Red Army officers, the secret protocol to the Molotov–Ribbentrop Pact, many details of the Winter War, the occupation of the Baltic states, the Soviet occupation of Bessarabia and Northern Bukovina, Western Allied assistance to the Soviet Union during the war, many other Western Allies' efforts, the Soviet leadership's mistakes and failures, criticism of the Soviet Union and other content were censored out.

Of note was the ban of the theory about the Varangian origin of Kievan Rus for ideological reasons.

=== Linguistics ===
At the beginning of Stalin's rule, the dominant figure in Soviet linguistics was Nikolai Yakovlevich Marr, who argued that language is a class construction and that language structure is determined by the economic structure of society. Stalin, who had previously written about language policy as People's Commissar for Nationalities, read a letter by Arnold Chikobava criticizing the theory. He "summoned Chikobava to a dinner that lasted from 9 p.m. to 7 a.m. taking notes diligently." In this way he grasped enough of the underlying issues to oppose this simplistic Marxist formalism, ending Marr's ideological dominance over Soviet linguistics. Stalin's principal work in the field was a small essay, "Marxism and Linguistic Questions."

The term "semiotics" was banned, and the researchers used the obfuscated term "secondary modeling systems" (Russian: Вторичные моделирующие системы) coined by Juri Lotman and Vladimir Uspensky in 1964; see Tartu–Moscow Semiotic School.

=== Pedology ===
Pedology was a popular area of research on the basis of numerous orphanages created after the Russian Civil War. Soviet pedology was a combination of pedagogy and psychology of human development, that heavily relied on various tests. It was officially banned in 1936 after a special decree of the Central Committee of the Communist Party of the Soviet Union "On Pedolodical Perversions in the Narkompros System" on July 4, 1936.

=== Physics ===
In the late 1940s, some areas of physics, were also criticized on grounds of "idealism".

In quantum mechanics Soviet physicists Dmitry Blokhintsev, Yaakov Terletsky and K. V. Nikolsky developed a version of the statistical interpretation of quantum mechanics, which was seen as more adhering to the principles of dialectical materialism.

Special and general relativity were a matter of controversy among the Soviet scientists since 1920. Some of them argued that this theory is grounded in Machism (acutely criticized by Vladimir Lenin in his Materialism and Empiriocriticism), others were a group of so-called "mechanists" (see Mechanists and dialecticians controversy), later "Young Stalinists" joined the ranks of the relativity theory. At the same time a considerable number of prominent Soviet physicists defended the relativity theory. The attacks on the relativity theory intensified in 1949 under the auspices of the struggle against the "physical idealism" in the work of Leonid Mandelstam. Initially Sergey Vavilov, President of the Academy of Sciences of the Soviet Union, managed to defend Mandelstam, but in 1952 the political attacks on "reactionary Einsteinianism" intensified further. This pseudoscientific campaign sizzled after the death of Stalin.

Although initially planned, the process of "ideological cleansing" in physics did not go as far as defining an "ideologically correct" version of physics and purging those scientists who refused to conform to it, because this was recognized as potentially too harmful to the Soviet nuclear program. During 1949-1951 there was "antiresonance campaign" against the theory of resonance, during which scientists who supported it were accused of "cosmopolitan" sympathies and repressed. As Anna Krylov writes on the perils of ideological intrusion into science, "Stalin rolled back the planned campaign against physics and instructed Beria to give physicists some space; this led to significant advances and accomplishments by Soviet scientists in several domains. However, neither Stalin nor the subsequent Soviet leaders were able to let go of the controls completely. Government control over science turned out to be a grand failure, and the attempt to patch the widening gap between the West and the East by espionage did not help. Today Russia is hopelessly behind the West in both technology and quality of life."

=== Sociology ===
After the Russian Revolution, sociology was gradually "politicized, Bolshevisized and eventually, Stalinized". In 1920s a position had formed in the Soviet Union that historical materialism is in fact Marxist sociology, and the major discussion was whether to use the terms "sociology" and "historical materialism" synonymously or to abandon the term "sociology" altogether and consider it to be an anti-Marxist bourgeois science. From 1930s to 1950s, the independent discipline of sociology virtually ceased to exist in the Soviet Union. Even in the era where it was allowed to be practiced, and not replaced by Marxist philosophy, it was always dominated by Marxist thought; hence sociology in the Soviet Union and the entire Eastern Bloc represented, to a significant extent, only one branch of sociology: Marxist sociology. With the death of Joseph Stalin and the 20th Party Congress in 1956, restrictions on sociological research were somewhat eased, and finally, after the 23rd Party Congress in 1966, sociology in Soviet Union was once again officially recognized as an acceptable branch of science.

=== Reliability of data ===
The quality (accuracy and reliability) of data published in the Soviet Union and used in historical research is another issue raised by various Sovietologists. The Marxist theoreticians of the Party considered statistics as a social science; hence many applications of statistical mathematics were curtailed, particularly during the Stalin era. Under central planning, nothing could occur by accident. The law of large numbers and the idea of random deviation were decreed as "false theories". Statistical journals and university departments were closed; world-renowned statisticians like Andrey Kolmogorov and Eugen Slutsky abandoned statistical research.

As with all Soviet historiography, reliability of Soviet statistical data varied from period to period. The first revolutionary decade and the period of Stalin's dictatorship both appear highly problematic with regards to statistical reliability; very little statistical data was published from 1936 to 1956 (see Soviet Census (1937)). The reliability of data improved after 1956 when some missing data was published and Soviet experts themselves published some adjusted data for Stalin's era; however the quality of documentation deteriorated.

While on occasion statistical data useful in historical research might have been completely invented by the Soviet authorities, there is little evidence that most statistics were significantly affected by falsification or insertion of false data with the intent to confound the West. Data was however falsified both during collection – by local authorities who would be judged by the central authorities based on whether their figures reflected the central economy prescriptions – and by internal propaganda, with its goal to portray the Soviet state in most positive light to its very citizens. Nonetheless, the policy of not publishing, or simply not collecting, data that was deemed unsuitable for various reasons was much more common than simple falsification; hence there are many gaps in Soviet statistical data. Inadequate or lacking documentation for much of Soviet statistical data is also a significant problem.

== Theme in literature ==
- Vladimir Dudintsev, White Garments (1987), a fictionalized story about Soviet geneticists working during the Lysenkoism era

== See also ==
- Bibliography of science and technology in Russia and the Soviet Union
- Academic freedom
- Antiscience
- Anti-intellectualism
- Bourgeois pseudoscience
- Censorship in the Soviet Union
- Deutsche Physik
- First Department
- Historical negationism
- Political correctness
- Politicization of science
- Science and technology in the Soviet Union
- Soviet historiography
- Alexander Veselovsky, a case of suppressed literary research
- Stalin and the Scientists
