= Soviet Scientists Immigration Act of 1992 =

United States legislation

- Long title: An Act to authorize the admission to the United States of certain scientists of the independent states of the former Soviet Union and the Baltic states as employment based immigrants under the Immigration and Nationality Act.
- Acronyms (colloquial): SSIA
- Nicknames: Commonwealth and Baltic Scientists Immigration and Exchange Act of 1992
- Enacted by: the 102nd United States Congress
- Effective: October 24, 1992

Citations
- Public law: 102-509
- Statutes at Large: 106 Stat. 3316

Codification
- Titles amended: 8 U.S.C.: Aliens and Nationality
- U.S.C. sections amended: 8 U.S.C. ch. 12, subch. II § 1153

Legislative history
- Introduced in the Senate as S. 2201 by Hank Brown (R–CO) on February 6, 1992; Committee consideration by Senate Judiciary, House Judiciary, House Foreign Affairs; Passed the Senate on May 20, 1992 (Passed); Passed the House on September 21, 1992 (Passed) with amendment; Senate agreed to House amendment on October 2, 1992 (Agreed); Signed into law by President George H. W. Bush on October 24, 1992

Soviet Scientists Immigration Act of 1992 granted authorization for engineers and scientists from the post-Soviet states to acquire employment within America. The Act of Congress implemented specific provisions of the Immigration and Nationality Act providing United States visas for former Soviet Union foreign nationals classified as scientific immigrants being employed in the United States.

The Senate bill was passed by the 102nd United States Congressional session and enacted into law by the 41st President of the United States George H.W. Bush on October 24, 1992.

== Provisions of the Act ==
The 1992 public law was authored as four sections defining requirements for the post-Soviet states whose citizens were seeking residency in the United States while possessing advanced engineering and scientific disciplines.

Short Title
- Act cited as the Soviet Scientists Immigration Act of 1992
Definitions
- Baltic states means the three sovereign nations of Estonia, Latvia, and Lithuania
- Independent states of the former Soviet Union means the twelve sovereign nations of Armenia, Azerbaijan, Belarus, Georgia, Kazakhstan, Kyrgyzstan, Moldova, Russia, Tajikistan, Turkmenistan, Ukraine, and Uzbekistan
- Eligible independent states and Baltic scientists means nationals of any of the independent states of the former Soviet Union or the Baltic states
- Scientists or engineers who have expertise in biological, chemical, nuclear, or other high technology fields or who are working on biological, chemical, nuclear, or other high-technology defense projects.
Waiver of Job Offer Requirement
- Foreign national services in the arts, business, or science be sought by an employer in the United States shall not apply to any eligible independent states or Baltic scientist who is applying for admission to the United States for permanent residence.
Classification of Independent States Scientists as Having Exceptional Ability
- Class of eligible independent states and Baltic scientists, based on their level of expertise, as aliens who possess exceptional ability in the sciences, for purposes of the Immigration and Nationality Act, whether or not such scientists possess advanced degrees.
- Eligible independent states and Baltic scientists are limited to seven hundred and fifty who may receive visas for four years or as specified by the Immigration and Nationality Act.

== Amendment to 1992 Act ==
Soviet Scientists Immigration Act was amended on September 30, 2002 with enactment of the Foreign Relations Authorization Act, Fiscal Year 2003. The amendment authorized a four-year extension for admission to the United States by eligible former Soviet Union and Baltic States scientists. The House 1646 bill heighten the 1992 visa provision from seven hundred and fifty to nine hundred and fifty for Post-Soviet states scientists possessing "exceptional ability in the sciences".

== See also ==
Academy of Sciences of the Soviet Union
Eastern Bloc emigration and defection
Former Soviet Union Demilitarization Act of 1992
History of the Soviet Union (1982–91)
Nunn–Lugar Cooperative Threat Reduction
Revolutions of 1989
Russia and weapons of mass destruction
Russian Academy of Sciences
Science and technology in the Soviet Union
Soviet atomic bomb project
Soviet biological weapons program
Soviet Nuclear Threat Reduction Act of 1991
Soviet space program
Soviet Union – United States relations
Suppressed research in the Soviet Union

Film and Literature of the Cold War Era
Man on a String (1960)
The Spy Who Came in from the Cold (1965)
The Gulag Archipelago (1973)
The Americans (2013)
Bridge of Spies (2015)
Stalin and the Scientists: A History of Triumph and Tragedy (2016)
