= Bourgeois pseudoscience =

Soviet Communist concept

Bourgeois pseudoscience (Russian: буржуазная лженаука, burzhuaznaya lzhenauka) was a term of condemnation in the Soviet Union for certain scientific disciplines that were deemed unacceptable from an ideological point of view due to their incompatibility with Marxism–Leninism. At various times pronounced "bourgeois pseudosciences" were: Mendelian genetics, (Note: See Lysenkoism and its impact in the other countries of the Soviet Bloc) cybernetics, quantum physics, the theory of relativity, geopolitics, sociology, and particular directions in comparative linguistics (the now-debunked Japhetic theory of Nikolai Marr, which initially enjoyed prominence until it was rejected by Joseph Stalin in his work Marxism and Problems of Linguistics).

The term was not used by Stalin himself, who rejected the notion that all sciences must have a class nature. Stalin removed all mention of "bourgeois biology" from Trofim Lysenko's report, The State of Biology in the Soviet Union, and in the margin next to the statement that "any science is based on class" Stalin wrote, "Ha-ha-ha!! And what about mathematics? Or Darwinism?" The term and its synonyms were used in the 1951 and 1954 editions of the Short Philosophical Dictionary: "Cybernetic is a reactionary pseudoscience originated in the United States... A form of modern mechanicism", "Eugenics is a bourgeois pseudoscience", "Weismannism-Morganism - bourgeois pseudoscience, designed to justify capitalism". Today, most scholars agree in characterizing eugenics as rooted in pseudoscience, albeit without the "bourgeois" qualifier.

Psychology was declared a "bourgeois pseudoscience" in the People's Republic of China during the Cultural Revolution (1966–1976). Furthermore, sociology was banned there in 1952, and it remained banned until the late 1970s.

== See also ==
- Repression of science in the Soviet Union
- Cybernetics in the Soviet Union
- Censorship in the Soviet Union
- Soviet historiography
- Politicization of science
