= Georgy Danilov =

Soviet academic (1897–1937)

- Георгий Данилов
- Born: Georgy Konstantinovich Danilov; 10 January 1897; Chyhyryn, Kiev Governorate, Russian Empire
- Died: 29 July 1937 (aged 40); Soviet Union
- Resting place: Donskoye Cemetery
- Education: Imperial Moscow University
- Occupations: Academic; linguist
- Years active: 1922–1937
- Military career
- Allegiance: Russian Empire
- Branch: Imperial Russian Army
- Service years: 1916–1918
- Conflicts: World War I

Georgy Konstantinovich Danilov (Russian: Георгий Костантинович Данилов; 10 January 1897 – 29 July 1937) was a Soviet linguist, Africanist and polyglot. He was executed during the Great Purge and rehabilitated during the Khrushchev Thaw.

== Early life and education ==
Georgy Konstantinovich Danilov was born on 10 January 1897 in Chyhyryn, a city located in the Chigirinsky Uyezd of the Kiev Governorate of the Russian Empire (now Cherkasy Oblast of central Ukraine). He was of Russian ethnicity.

Danilov enrolled at Moscow University (ИФФ МУ, Faculty of engineering and physics) in 1916 but was immediately drafted into the Imperial Army and sent to the front during World War I for a period of two years. Although he formally graduated, his education remained incomplete.

In 1922 he returned to Moscow, where he was assigned to the department of languages at the Communist University of the Toilers of the East (or Коммунистический университет трудящихся Востока КУТВ). He worked at КомА (Коммунистическая академия, Communist Academy), then taught high school.

== Marxist linguistics ==
In February 1931, Danilov became the assistant director of the linguistic Institute linked to the Наркомпрос (Народный комиссариат просвещения, the People's Commissariat for Enlightenment). Danilov used linguistics to solve day-to-day practical political problems and his works were intimately related to social class. His approach to Marxism was dogmatic, always asking what the real Marxism was in linguistics and who could be called a true Marxist linguist.

The social purpose of his work emerged from a linguistic study, done in Ukraine, entitled: Язык общественного класса (по данным говора мест. Белик Полтавского округа), or The Language of Social Class (according to the Dialect of Beliki, in the Region of Poltava). The greatest achievement of this linguistic survey has been the modernity of his methods, using what he called mass observation that in a way is reminiscent of modern sociolinguistics.

The area where Danilov and his team worked was the village of Beliki in the region of Poltava, in the summer of 1927. In his work, dated 1928, the author focused on the language of people, conducting a “linguistic survey” and studying data obtained through interviews according to different linguistic axes. The study consisted of identifying citizen class types and of demonstrating their particular speech and how this contributes to the class struggle. The main method to search for material and information consisted of a systematic investigation of many people of different ages, gender, and social status. What emerged from this linguistic analysis was the strong role that language can have in the class struggle between proletariat and bourgeoisie.

Danilov shared the belief, which was widespread in the second half of the 1920s, that the socio-economic conditions of a social group or class are reflected by their psychology and their language used. The different uses of language in these classes introduce a new hierarchy in which poor peasants occupy the bottom of the ladder, as they use the archaic lexicon reduced to the terminology of agriculture. In this classification, skilled workers and local cadres occupy a high place - they are bilingual, they use the Russian language of the October Revolution but they also speak Ukrainian. Danilov interpreted this diversity of language as the result of differences between the psychologies of classes.

Danilov suggested a new language that can finally unite the classes: Russian, since it relates to the Revolution. He later acknowledged the limitations of this work, affirming that he should have looked beyond the results and should not have considered these results as answers, but as the key to arrive at the answers.

== Jazikofront ==
During the 1930s in the Soviet Union two main linguistic schools existed: those who followed the idea of an ancient proto-language developed a long time ago, namely Proto-Indo-European, and those who followed the theory postulated by Nikolay Marr, the Japhetic theory, which postulated that the Kartvelian languages of the Caucasus area are related to the Semitic languages of the Middle East. Marrism claimed to represent "proletarian science" as opposed to the "bourgeois science" of Indo-European linguistics.

The situation became more complicated, however, on 15 September 1930, when Danilov formally founded Jazikofront, a group of linguists belonging to the Communist Academy who rejected the Japhetic theory. For the first time in the USSR, Marrism was attacked by Marxist linguists, who criticized Marrism's single-minded focus on genetic analysis, as opposed to functional analysis concerned with the ongoing development and use of language.

The "Jazikofront" also included other important young linguists, such as K.A. Alaverdov, Y.V. Loya, T.P. Lomtev and P.S. Kuznetsov. These young linguists fought on two different fronts: against the traditional approach to language and against other pretenders to the throne of new linguistics and other linguists claiming to be Marxists. Their criticism was not ideological but technical. Ideologically, Marr's positions coincided with those of the group, but they believed it was necessary to revise the method of study proposed by him. The young linguists of Jazikofront, together with Danilov, shared the conviction with Marrists that Indo-European linguistics was an obsolete approach to the study of language, but their conclusions about what should replace it were different. They felt that linguistics had to deal with present-day reality and it should concentrate on the relation between language, class, and the proletariat consciousness to create a socialist society. The Jazikofront criticised the Japhetic theory because its approach to the study of the language was useless to solve the real problems of Soviet linguistics.

Danilov was attacked by both Indo-Europeanists and Marrists. His bitter enemy was Yevgeny Polivanov, whom Danilov accused of adopting an anti-proletarian position because he defended Indo-European studies and labeled as a Trotskyist. However, the arguments provided by Danilov to disprove the thesis of Polivanov were unclear and confusing, sometimes even contradictory.

Danilov's influence on the new linguistic movement likewise brought him into conflict with the exponents of Marrism, who used the term "danilovščina" (даниловщина), coined by Jakubinskii, to denounce Danilov's ideas as a dangerous tendency for the development of new linguistics.

Jazikofront survived until 1932.

== African studies in Soviet Union ==
Georgy Danilov was also an exponent of African studies, and especially South Africa, which resulted in the creation of НИАНКП (the Research Association for the Study of National and Colonial Problems). Soviet African studies emerged in the late 1920s to the late 1930s. During that period none of the Soviet Africanist scholars travelled to Africa; instead, in the early 1930s a Department of Africa was created at one of the Comintern's universities, the Communist University of Eastern Toilers. There was also an African Department, or the African Laboratory (“Kabinet”) in the Academic Research Association for National and Colonial Problems. Its main task was collecting materials on Africa.

The activities of both these centres were diverse. Not only did they study Africa's socio–economic problems and history but languages as well. Both Moscow and Leningrad academics were involved in these studies, as well as émigrés from African countries and Africans who came to study at the Comintern's universities (Lenin School and KUTV).

Danilov was the initiator of the study of African languages in Moscow. His efforts gave birth to the first Soviet Congress for African Languages in Moscow in January 1934, during which his two papers "Perspectives, tasks and methods of studies on African languages" and "Phonetical system of Swahili" were presented.

== The Great Purge ==
Danilov was an active member of the Communist Party. Like a number of other linguists and Africanists he perished due to the Great Purge. On 28 December 1934 he was expelled from the CPSU (b), and in January 1935 he was dismissed from all his jobs and forced to work as an educator in children's colonies of the OGPU in Kaluga and near Serpukhov.

Danilov was arrested on 14 May 1937. He was found guilty of crimes against his country and for being a member of a counterrevolutionary terrorist organization. He was executed on 29 July 1937. Danilov's ashes were scattered in the Donskoy Cemetery. He was rehabilitated on 10 November 1956.
