= Nikolai Baskakov =

Nikolai or Nikolay Baskakov may refer to:

- Nikolai Baskakov (linguist) (1905–1995), Soviet linguist
- Nikolai Ivanovich Baskakov (Hero of Socialist Labour) (1905–1969), Soviet forester, Hero of Socialist Labour
- Nikolai Ivanovich Baskakov (1903–1977), Soviet Greco-Roman wrestler
- Nikolai Baskakov (painter) (1918–1993), Soviet portrait artist
