= Israsov fraud case =

1990s embezzlement case

The Israsov fraud case was a financial scheme in which Leonid Roitman embezzled funds from Jewish immigrants from the former Soviet Union who immigrated to Israel during the 1990s. Roitman served as an intermediary for transferring money from Russia to Israel through a company called "Israsov," but diverted part of the funds to invest in real estate and private business ventures. In 2003, he was convicted of embezzling approximately $18 million. (Note: Approximately 35 million dollars in 2025 terms)

== Course of the case ==
Following the dissolution of the Soviet Union, hundreds of thousands of Jews from former Soviet states immigrated to Israel. Due to the lack of adequate infrastructure at Israeli consulates and embassies, the Israeli authorities abroad turned to private businessmen for assistance with various logistical tasks, including visa issuance and staff recruitment. Since exporting foreign currency from Russia was forbidden and no formal financial agreement existed between Israel and Russia, immigrants were forced to transfer their funds through unofficial private channels.

Leonid Roitman, head of the Federation of Jewish Communities of the Former Soviet Union, assisted the Israeli embassy in Moscow with personnel and housing arrangements. To facilitate money transfers to Israel, he founded several companies, including "Isra-Sov." Immigrants signed contracts with Isra-Sov, which stated that if the company failed to deliver their funds to Israel, they would be able to withdraw the equivalent sum from a designated account at Bank Mizrahi. Israeli diplomatic agencies presented the company to immigrants as a legitimate and safe method of transferring funds.

Between 1992 and 1996, the company received around $70 million from more than 5,000 Jewish immigrant families. Of this, approximately $53 million was successfully delivered to Israel. However, in early 1995, due to a series of failed investments by Roitman, the company was unable to return about $18 million to some depositors. Despite this, Israsov continued to accept new deposits and invest them. Immigrants who approached the company’s Israeli office were issued bounced checks. By February 1996, the company had ceased operations and its assets were frozen. Roitman had used the funds for high-risk investments, real estate, salary payments, and other business ventures. Around $9 million was never transferred to Israel at all, and $3.5 million of the funds were reportedly donated to charity.

During an investigation by the Israeli police, it was discovered that Roitman had forged guarantees from the Bank of Israel and falsely claimed to be operating under official approval.

=== Legal proceedings ===
In 1998, Roitman was arrested, and an indictment was filed against him on charges of aggravated fraud, theft by a trustee, offenses by corporate officers, fraud and breach of trust in a corporation, and issuing bad checks.

In 2003, he was convicted in the Jerusalem District Court of five counts of aggravated fraud, theft by a trustee in the amount of 18 million dollars, an offense by a corporate officer, fraud and breach of trust in a corporation, and issuing checks without coverage. Roitman was sentenced to 10 years in prison, two years of probation, and a fine of one million dollars. During the trial, Roitman, through his attorney Advocate Shahar Rotkopf, claimed that he had committed no criminal offense, and that this was merely a business failure.

Roitman appealed to the Israeli Supreme Court, arguing—through attorneys Helena Luboshitz and Rosa Friedman of the Public Defender's Office—that he had acted in good faith and within the law. The court rejected his appeal, stating that this was a systematic fraud that exploited the trust of thousands of Jewish immigrants and abused Roitman’s public position.

=== Social response and the “SUD” association ===
Following the exposure of the case, the artist Vera Gutkina led the public struggle on behalf of the victims. Gutkina, whose own family had fallen victim to the fraud, founded the “SUD – Support and Solidarity for the Victims of Israsov” association in 1996 to unify the hundreds of victims and fight for the recognition of their rights. Gutkina headed the association and campaigned for years to promote the expose of the case and demand compensation, working with journalists, legal professionals, and members of the Knesset. Under Gutkina's leadership, the association worked to raise public awareness, staged protests outside the Knesset, appeal to Knesset committees, and facilitate legal mediation with the state. In October 1996, a meeting was held by the Knesset's Immigration and Integration Committee, chaired by Member of Knesset Naomi Blumenthal, which addressed the Israsov case. During the session, attorney Yoram Sheftel argued that the state should compensate the immigrants, a position that received the support of the committee chair.

The association was legally represented by attorney Yaakov Hasdai, who worked toward legal recognition of the state's responsibility for the damage, citing a systemic failure of oversight. The association demanded the establishment of a government compensation mechanism. This demand was eventually accepted, and approximately 29 million Israeli new shekel was awarded in compensation, to the 465 affected families.
