= Aleksandr Maksimov =

Aleksandr Maksimov and other variations may refer to:

- Oleksandr Maksymov (born 1985), Ukrainian footballer
- Aleksandr Maksimov (ethnographer) (1872–1941), Soviet ethnographer
- Alexander A. Maximow (1874–1928), Russian-American histologist
- Alexander Maximov (politician) (born 1946), Russian politician
