= Valerian Aptekar =

Russian linguist (1899–1937)

- Born: 24 October 1899; Warsaw, Congress Poland, Russian Empire
- Died: 29 July 1937 (aged 37); Moscow, Russian SFSR, Soviet Union
- Cause of death: Execution
- Occupations: Historian, linguist

Valerian Borisovich Aptekar (Russian: Валериа́н Бори́сович Апте́карь; 24 October 1899 – 29 July 1937) was a Russian linguist and a propagandist of Nicholas Marr's New Theory of Language. In 1937, he was accused of anti-Soviet activity, arrested and shot. Rehabilitated posthuomously.

== Life ==
Aptekar was born in Warsaw in 1899, the son of a dentist. From 1910 to 1918, he studied at the Zolotonosha gymnasium. In 1918, he became a clerk at the local labour exchange and joined the trade union member. In 1918, he joined the Communist Party. During the Russian Civil War, he was a political commissar.

After being wounded, he moved to Poltava, where he worked as a Special Section investigator. In 1919, he went to Moscow and entered the military engineering course for Red Army leaders, but he was soon recalled to work in the Political Department of the internal security forces.

From August 1922 to October 1925, he studied foreign relations in the Moscow State University Social Sciences Department. From October 1923 to October 1925, while still a student, he taught at the Moscow Military District Political School. In the 1920s, he also was a propagandist for the Communist Academy and worked as a censor for the State Publishing House.

In February 1926, he was appointed an associate professor at the Moscow State University Faculty of Education. From 1928 to 1929, he was deputy chairman of the language section of the Oriental Institute. He was also scientific secretary of the material linguistics section in the Communist Academy.

He had no systematic training in archaeology, ethnology or linguistics, but as a devoted follower of Marr, he was sure that following "true" methodologies could compensate for that lack. He played an important role in destroying the old schools of archaeology and ethnology and introducing Marrist and Marxist theories into Soviet academia.

In April 1929, Aptekar was working at the State Academy of the History of Material Culture, when he launched his most effective attack against ethnography.

In 1932, Aptekar was expelled from the party for concealing his involvement with supporters of Gavril Myasnikov. On 14 May 1937, he was arrested. On 29 July 1937, he was sentenced to death for participating in a counterrevolutionary terrorist organization; he was executed and shot the same day.

Aptekar was executed within a few weeks of Yevgeny Polivanov, his main opponent in the debate over linguistics. His ashes were buried in the Donskoy Monastery in Moscow. He was rehabilitated in 1958.

According to classical philologist Olga Freidenberg, who first met Aptekar in 1928, "Happily and self-confidently he admitted his lack of education. Guys like Aptekar, ignoramuses, would come from the villages and out of the way places, bone up on party slogans, Marxist schemes and newspaper phraseology and feel like rulers and dictators. With a clear conscience they would instruct scholars and were sincerely convinced that for the correct systematization of learning ('Methodology') knowledge itself was not necessary."

== Ethnology ==
On 7 May 1928, Aptekar forcibly expressed his opinions in a debate on "Marxism and ethnology" at the Society of Marxist Historians. He argued that ethnology was not scientific, that the concepts it dealt with were vague, and that by treating the development of mankind in terms of the evolution of cultural forms, ethnographers denied the more fundamental forces of production and class struggle. He described ethnology as a "bourgeois social science that is a parasite on the body of Marxist sociology and history." The subject could be approached only in terms of dialectical materialism.

He said, "If you look into the history of ethnology, you'll see that it was created by priests, missionaries, merchants, slave-owners, and travellers who founded colonies."

Ethnographer Sergei Aleksandrovich Tokarev publicly disagreed. Although he accepted the need for a more scientific approach, and for the subject to be treated from a Marxist–Leninist viewpoint, he defended the study of ethnology as dealing with realities that could not be ignored.

In April 1929, Aptekar returned to the attack in Leningrad, where he was opposed by philosopher P. F. Preobrazhensky, winning the debate that concluded that ethnography should move to a Marxist basis, studying only socio-economic systems with focus on social and cultural development. In the debate, Aptekar said that the "old" ethnographers were "ideological opponents of the new order."

== Linguistics ==
Aptekar was a believer in Marr's "Japhetic theory," which held that the Kartvelian languages of the Caucasus area such as Georgian were related to the Semitic languages of the Middle East, in contrast to the school that held that the languages were Indo-European (one member being Arnold Chikobava). That grew into an ideological issue, with support for Japhetism being required for professional advancement.

By 1928, Aptekar was a leading proponent of the theory. As members of the "Methodological Bureau" of Marr's institute, Aptekar and S.N. Bykovskij organized a series of linguistic debates in which they angrily attacked leading traditional linguists, whom they accused of being bourgeois, as well as other opponents. One of these, the leading Soviet linguist Yevgeny Polivanov, described them as "language-less linguists."

In 1929, there was a debate over switching to the Latin alphabet for Russian and the many other languages of the Soviet Union. Proponents considered that the Latin alphabet was simple, rational, international, and easier to learn than the "Church-Slavonic" Cyrillic script. Aptekar was among those violently opposed to the change, which failed to gain momentum.

In 1934, Aptekar spoke against "bourgeois linguistics:" "At the present time, there is nothing that can come from its prolonged and tortured agony. It has to die along with the bourgeois sociality that gave rise to it, clearing the way for the Marxist-Leninist theory of language that is being built in our country."

== Bibliography ==
- Valerian Borisovich Aptekar; Sergei Bykovsky (1931). The current situation on the linguistic front, and the immediate tasks of the Marxists-linguists. State Academy of the History of Material Culture. p. 47.
- Nikolai Yakovlevich Marr; Valerian Borisovich Aptekar (1934). Language and Society. State Academy of the History of Material Culture.
- Valerian Borisovich Aptekar (1934). N.Y. Marr and the new doctrine of language. State Socioeconomic Publisher. p. 185.
- Nikolay Yakovlevich Marr; Valerian Borisovich Aptekar (1936). Collected articles. Power to the Soviets. p. 207.

== Sources ==
- Alpatov, Vladimir M. (1 October 2011). "Soviet Linguistics of the 1920s and 1930s and the Scholarly Heritage". In Craig Brandist; Katya Chown (eds.). Politics and the Theory of Language in the USSR 1917-1938: The Birth of Sociological Linguistics. Anthem Press. ISBN 978-0-85728-404-4.
- Anchabadze, Yuri D. (2010). "С.А.ТОКАРЕВ: НАЧАЛО ПУТИ [S.A.TOKAREV initial way]" (PDF). ИСТОРИЯ НАУКИ (History of Science) (in Russian) (3).
- Anthony, David W. (2009-08-17). The Horse, the Wheel, and Language: How Bronze-Age Riders from the Eurasian Steppes Shaped the Modern World. Princeton University Press. p. 97. ISBN 978-0-691-14818-2.
- Bertrand, Frédéric. (2002). L'anthropologie soviétique des années 20-30. Configuration d'une rupture. Presses universitaires de Bordeaux. ISBN 2-86781-270-4.
- Boškovi, Aleksandar (2008-03-16). Other People's Anthropologies: Ethnographic Practice on the Margins. Berghahn Books. ISBN 978-1-84545-398-5.
- Freidenberg, Olga (1997-03-01). Image and Concept: Mythopoetic Roots of Literature. Taylor & Francis. p. 8. ISBN 978-90-5702-507-5.
- Hirsch, Francine (2005). Empire of Nations: Ethnographic Knowledge & the Making of the Soviet Union. Cornell University Press. ISBN 978-0-8014-4273-5.
- Kohl, Philip L.; Fawcett, Clare (1996-02-08). Nationalism, Politics and the Practice of Archaeology. Cambridge University Press. p. 124. ISBN 978-0-521-55839-6.
- Smith, Michael G. (1998). Language and Power in the Creation of the Ussr, 1917-1953. Walter de Gruyter. ISBN 978-3-11-016197-7.
- Suny, Ronald Grigor; Kennedy, Michael D. (2001-07-30). Intellectuals and the Articulation of the Nation. University of Michigan Press. ISBN 978-0-472-08828-7.
- Van Helden, W. Andries (1993). Studies in Slavic and General Linguistics. Rodopi. ISBN 978-90-5183-514-4.
- Vasilkov, J. B.; Sorokin, M.Yu. (2003). "Aptekar, Valerian Borisovich". Bibliographical Dictionary of Orientalists - victims of political terror in the Soviet period (1917-1991). St.-Petersburg.
