= Aptekar =

Aptekar is an Indian and Russian-language surname. "Аптекарь" in Russian literally means "pharmacist". While in India, it is a common surname from the chitpawan community. Notable people with the surname include:

- Lev Aptekar (born 1936), Soviet-New Zealand chess master, coach, and writer
- Raphail Aptekar (1936–2020), Soviet and Russian astrophysicist
- Valerian Borisovich Aptekar (1899–1937), Russian historian and linguist

== See also ==
- Apteker
- Aptekman
