= Nikolai Baskakov (linguist) =

Soviet Turkologist (1905–1996)

Nikolai Aleksandrovich Baskakov

Nikolai Aleksandrovich Baskakov (Russian: Никола́й Алекса́ндрович Баска́ков; 22 March 1905 – 26 August 1996) was a Soviet Turkologist, linguist, and ethnologist. He created a systematization model of the Turkic language family (Baskakov's classification), and studied Turkic-Russian contacts in the 10-11th centuries CE. During 64 years of scientific work (1930-1994), Baskakov published almost 640 works including 32 books. The main area of Baskakov's scientific interests was linguistics, but he also studied folklore and ethnography of the Turkic peoples, and also was a musician and composer.

== Life ==
Baskakov was born in 1905 in Solvychegodsk in Vologda Governorate (now Arkhangelsk Oblast) in a large family of a district government official. His father came from a family banished in the beginning of the 19th century from Saint Petersburg to the Vologda province, and mother was a daughter of an official and a teacher. In a book about Russian surnames of Turkic origin (1979) Baskakov gives the following comment about his surname: "The surname Baskakov comes from a Tatar baskak, Amragan (*Amyr-khan), a viceroy in the second half of the 13th century in Vladimir. The Turkic origin of this surname is confirmed by the very root of the surname basqaq "the one who puts seal, a viceroy of the Khan of the Golden Horde", and by the heraldic data: a curved sword in the center and an image of a Tatar over the crest who is holding a red curved saber" (p. 245).

As a young student, in 1916, Baskakov met an old friend of his father's, Bessonov, a Russian dragoman or envoy to Jedda (then part of the Ottoman Empire). The Russian diplomat's stories about eastern countries affected young Baskakov's imagination. He took a great interest in the East, and Turkey in particular. He began reading about Turkey and even tried to study the Turkish language by himself. In Baskakov's words, "This pursuit probably affected choice of my speciality - Turkology, which my father later named "missionary work", or maybe my speciality was prompted by the genes of my ancestors, Turks or Mongols?".

In 1918, when Baskakov was attending the gymnasium in the town Gryazov, he took part in a piano class at Gryazov's musical school. From that time music accompanied him throughout his life. Post-revolutionary shocks of 1920s immediately tested the vicissitudes of life, from 1919 to 1922. While studying in a unified labor school reorganized from his gymnasium, Baskakov worked as an ordinary clerk, and as a draftsman in the public health department. In 1922 Baskakov graduated from high school and went to Gryazov pedagogical school, but the aspirations to become an Orientalist did not leave him.

In 1923 Baskakov came to Moscow to enter the Moscow Institute of Oriental Studies. He naively entered in a questionnaire that he sympathized with "anarchists-collectivists" group that had just joined Russian Communist Party (Bolshevik), and on the first interview was refused admittance. After that, without hesitation, he turned to a private Institute of the Word headed by Musin-Pushkin, now a Linguistics Institute of the Russian Academy of Science. But unable to meet the payments, he had to leave Moscow and to return to Vologda, to work in pedagogical school. At the start of 1924 Baskakov was dismissed first from his pedagogical school, and then from Vologda pedagogical school, for participation in an anti-religious dispute where he advocated that God is good, and the Satan is evil, and that God always wins, and that people need religion.

Baskakov fled to Ukraine, near Cherkassy, and earned living as a tutor. In 1924, Baskakov went to Leningrad and attempted to enter the Oriental Institute, but failed again. A third attempt was a success, Baskakov was accepted to the San-Gali State Institute of People's Education. San-Gali State Institute was a two-year educational institution that was preparing teachers for high school. A number of prominent "former people" found shelter there.

In 1925, Baskakov was admitted to the Moscow State University Ethnographic branch of the Historical Ethnological faculty. During his study Baskakov traveled to Karakalpak ASSR, Kazakhstan, Kirgizia and Khorezm area of Uzbekistan to gather material on Uighurs, Kirghiz and Kazakh languages, ethnography, language and folklore of Karakalpaks and Khorezm Uzbeks. His instructors were A.N. Maksimov, P.F. Preobrajensky, V.K. Trutovsky, M.N. Peterson, V.A. Gordlevsky, folklore also the literature, N.K. Dmitriev, and Vasily Bartold lectured on history of Central Asia and Jeti-su Türks.

In 1929 Baskakov graduated from the University with a degree in history, archeology, ethnography, languages, folklore and literature of Turkic peoples. Baskakov was retained by the faculty of Turkic philology, with additional duties at the Central Ethnographical Museum, and continued expeditions to the Karakalpak ASSR, and Khorezm. In 1930, Baskakov was sent to Karakalpak ASSR regional department of national education to chair a committee to institute a transitional Latin alphabet for the Karakalpak people, to substitute for their traditional Arabic alphabet. In 1930-1931, Baskakov helped to organize the Karakalpak Regional Museum and a Scientific Institute.

In 1931, Baskakov returned to Moscow and joined Linguistic Commission of Research Association for National (ethnic) and Colonial problems at the Communist University of Eastern Workers (CUEW), and became a docent of CUEW. In 1934 Baskakov was appointed to the Russian SFSR Central Committee of New Alphabet (CCNA) and sent to Kazakhstan, Kirgizia and Oirot (present Mountain Altai) to study problems of "language construction" in the native schools. Baskakov was sent to all territories populated by Nogais (Astrakhan, Dagestan ASSR, Krasnodar, Crimea ASSR) with an aim to "create" a "Nogai literary language" with a new quasi-Cyrillic alphabet.

In 1936, Baskakov became a docent of Uighur language faculty in the Moscow Institute of Oriental Studies, later a Language and Literacy Institute of USSR peoples. In 1938, as a reward for his publications, Baskakov became a PhD in Philology without writing a thesis dissertation. In 1939-1940, Baskakov worked on country-wide transitioning of the Turkic peoples from the Arabic to a slew of quasi-Cyrillic alphabets, visiting Kazan, Ufa, Tashkent and Alma-Ata. During World War II, Baskakov was sent to Oirot (Altaians). Living in Altai enabled Baskakov to collect rich material on dialects and folklore of Altaians across their land. In 1943, Baskakov returned to Moscow to work in N. Ya. Marr Institute of Language and Thinking of the USSR Academy of Sciences. In that institution, under its many different names, Baskakov worked for almost 50 years. He visited Lithuania, Northern Caucasus, Turkmenia and Khakassia helping to establish new scientific institutions. In 1950, Baskakov wrote a dissertation themed "Karakalpak language. Parts of speech and word-formation" for the Doctor of Philology degree. In 1989, Baskakov retired from active work, but continued voluntary work, and remained a chief scientist in the Karakalpak branch of the Uzbek SSR Academy of Sciences.

Baskakov was an honorary member of the Great Britain Royal Asian society, Turkish linguistic society, International Uralo-Altai society (Hamburg), Scientific organization of Polish Orientalists, Scientific organization of Hungarian Orientalists Kereshi-Choma, a corresponding member of Finno-Ugric society (Helsinki).

He died in 1996, having survived the entire existence of the Soviet Union.

== Scientific contribution ==
Retirement allowed Baskakov to work on collected material and publications. Before the beginning of the 20th century, few Turkic languages were studied and reflected in dictionaries and grammar books, without which was impossible to teach languages or conduct constructive research. Baskakov actively joined in creation of lexicographical and grammatical works for poorly studied and totally unknown major Turkic languages.

Studying a number of Turkic languages simultaneously, Baskakov evaluated the degree of their genetic affinity, and learned the principles of Turkic typology, which eventually resulted in creation of a synthesizing concept, a new classification of Turkic languages. First published in 1952, the Baskakov taxonomical classification, unlike the previous classifications built on limited number of linguistic attributes, accounted for grammatical system and lexical structure of the Turkic languages as a whole, coordinating formation of separate language groups with the history of their peoples.

Baskakov's classification of Turkic languages was published twice as a textbook Introduction to study of Turkic languages (1962 and 1969), and is well known to the Türkologists of the world. Baskakov's classification remains the only classification built with understanding of the history of the Turkic peoples known at the time.

From the end of the 1970s Baskakov developed a typological model of the grammatical system of the Turkic languages. Baskakov developed a complete concept of Turkic language type, described in three monographs, "Historical structural typology of Turkic languages" (1975), "Historical typological morphology of Turkic languages" (1979), and "Historical typological phonology of Turkic languages" (1988). Baskakov's concept recognized isomorphism of all language levels, from the top syntax level.

From the end of the 1970s, Baskakov developed a typological model of the grammatical system of Turkic languages. Baskakov's concept on the most ancient typological structure of Turkic languages found "hypothetically initial pre-agglutinative form of Turkic, where abstract grammatical constructions were formed from main roots in postposition, and were gradually transformed to analytical elements, and then to affixes of the synthetic form".

Even though typologically the languages of the Altai family are related, their genetic relationship is contested. Baskakov advocated a genetic relationship of Turkic, Mongolian, Tunguso-Manchurian, Korean and Japanese languages.

== Major publications ==
By the end of the 1930s, Baskakov published works on Karakalpak, Uighur and Nogai languages. Baskakov participated in creation of the first bilingual Turkic-Russian and Russian-Turkic dictionaries for Uighur (1939), Altay (1947), and Khakass (1953), and headed the creation of Russian-Uighur (1941), Nogai-Russian (1963), Russian-Altai (1964), Russian-Karakalpak (1967) and Turkmen-Russian (1968) dictionaries. Baskakov participated in creation of first trilingual dictionaries for Turkic languages, Gagauz-Russian-Moldavian (1973), Karaim-Russian-Polish (1974). Publication of trilingual dictionaries was preceded by two his publications that established main principles of composing trilingual dictionaries (1968, 1971). The Uighur, Altai, Khakass, and Nogai dictionaries had brief grammatical descriptions of the languages.

Baskakov's first description of grammar in Turkic languages was published in "Brief grammar of the Karkalpak language" (Turtkul, 1932). It was continued in subsequent works "The Nogai language and its dialects" (1940) and "The Karakalpak language, vol. 2. Phonetics and morphology" (1952). Baskakov continues traditions of Turkic grammar represented in popular Altai grammar and in grammatical works of P.L. Melioransky and V.L. Gordlevsky. Baskakov published dialectal material, a series "Northern dialects of the Altai (Oirot) language" in three parts, "Dialect of taiga Tatars (Tuba-Kiji)" (1966), "Dialect of Kumandy-kiji" (1972), "Dialect of Kuu Tatars-Chelkans (Kuu-kiji)" (1985) (Turkic "kiji" = "people", a frequent ethnonym-forming suffix). The descriptions have shown full linguistic independence of these little-known languages.

Baskakov wrote a series of historical etymological works about the names of the Turkic peoples and tribes (Kypchaks, Kirghizes, Bashkirs, Kumans, Badjanks, Tuvinians, Khakases), edited epic publications of Turkic peoples (Altai heroic epos "Madai-kara", Khakass heroic epos "Altyn-Aryg"). In 1991, Baskakov composed the national hymn of the republic Karakalpakistan and hymn of Mountain Altai republic.

== Linguistical controversies ==
In the 1990s, after the fall of the former USSR and the opening of communication channels from it to the world, there surfaced criticism from the Turkish scholars, who advocated existence of only three languages inside Turkic family: Turkish, Chuvash and Sakha (Yakut), while the others are not languages, but dialects with very close affinity, artificially divided and segregated into languages, splitting the uniform Turkic world. Baskakov's position was that the Turkic world is not divided, but consists of living languages that develop into independent vernaculars. At the beginning of the 20th century, the majority of Turkic peoples had their individuality, in addition to the territory each ethnos had its history, consciousness and self-name, culture, folklore, and language, some peoples had their own literary form, with rich old tradition of literature, and a system of their subordinated dialects, and the affinity among them is not dialectal, but linguistical.

The process of separation of the Turkic languages also continues now in different conditions, in 1978 a written standard was introduced to the Dolgans, in 1989 to the Tofalars, Siberian Tatars are on the way to introducing their own. Each people resolves this subject for themselves. In these conditions the existing peoples and languages of the Turkic family should be carefully preserved as rare gifts of the nature, and should be given full opportunity to develop, while Turkish, the largest language of the Turkic family with immense literature and long history, can be used as a language of interethnic dialogue.
