= Linguistics in the Soviet Union =

The Soviet Union actively tried to incorporate Marxist ideals into the study of linguistics.

Linguists had important positions in the early Soviet state, as they were needed to develop alphabets for languages that previously had never been written.

In the 1920s, language began to be seen as a social phenomenon, and Russian and Soviet linguists tried to give a sociological explanation to features of language. At the same time, Soviet linguists sought to develop a "Marxist" linguistics, as opposed to the early theories that were viewed as bourgeois. Based on this, linguists focused more on the spoken forms of the language, and devoted more time to the study of non-standard dialects than previous linguists had done. This can be seen in the work of Boris Alexandrovich Larin and Lev Petrovich Iakubinskii.

The leading linguist of the early Soviet era was Nicholas Marr, known for his Japhetic theory. The theory suggested that the Kartvelian languages had a common origin with the Semitic languages. He also applied the idea of class struggle to the development of language. After Marr died, an article by Stalin blasted Marr's theory, stating "Soviet linguistics cannot be advanced on the basis of an incorrect formula which is contrary to the whole course of the history of peoples and languages." Politically, World War II caused a rise in nationalism, which Japhetic theory argued against. This theory was never accepted outside the Soviet Union.

== Historical linguistics ==
In stark contrast to the "splitters" of mainstream Western historical linguistics, the majority of prominent Soviet historical linguists were "lumpers" belonging to the Moscow School of Comparative Linguistics. These linguists, who were all staunch proponents of the Nostratic theory, included Vladislav Illich-Svitych, Aharon Dolgopolsky, and Sergei Starostin.

== See also ==
- List of Russian linguists and philologists
- Japhetic theory
