= Ibero-Caucasian languages =

Proposed language family

Ibero-Caucasian
- Caucasian
- (controversial)
- Geographic distribution: Caucasus
- Ethnicity: Caucasian peoples
- Native speakers: c. 10 million (2020)
- Linguistic classification: Proposed language family
- Proto-language: Proto-Caucasian language
- Subdivisions: Northwest Caucasian; Northeast Caucasian; Kartvelian; Hurro-Urartian?; Hattic?

Language codes
- Glottolog: None
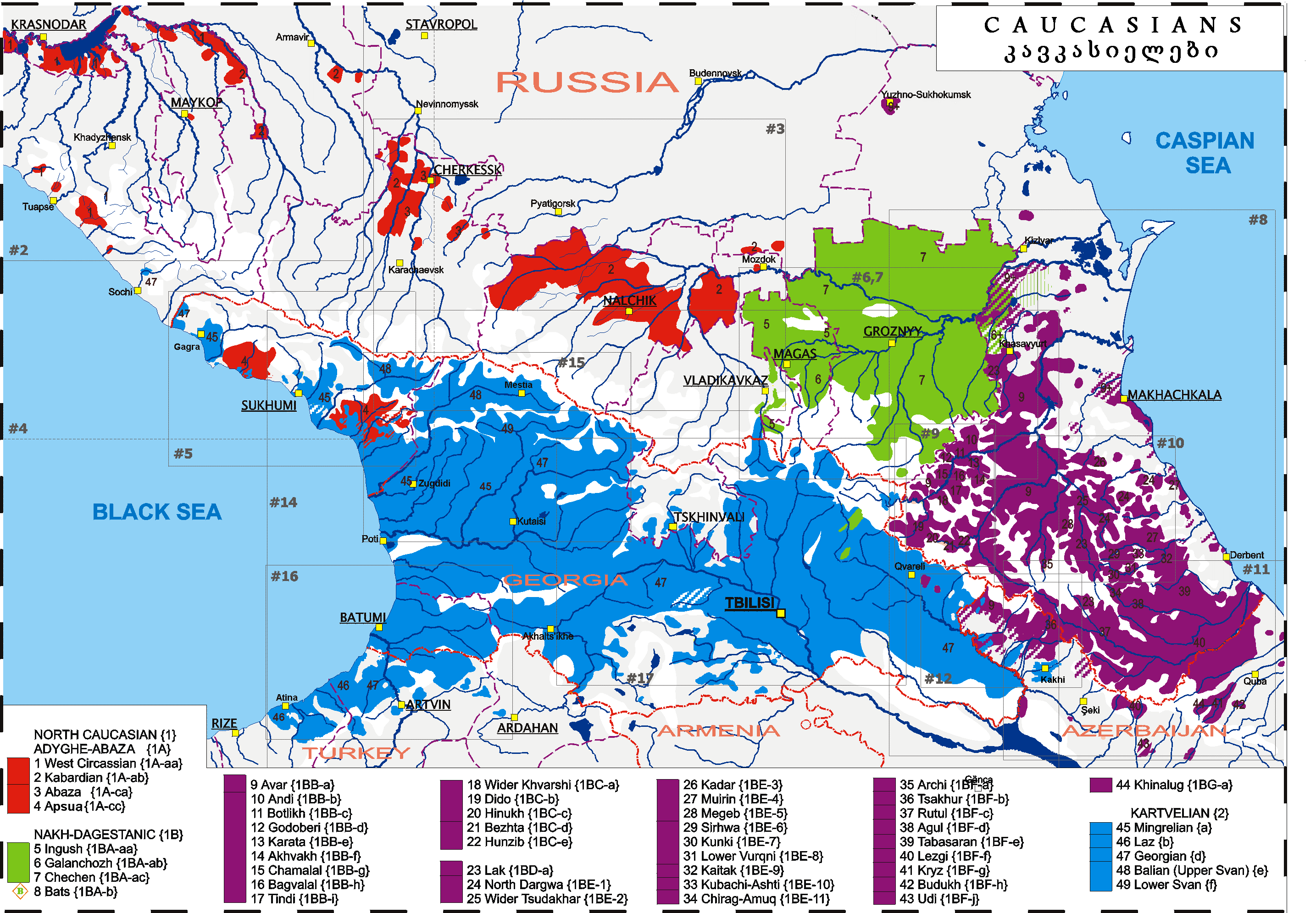
- The distribution of the Caucasian languages

Ibero-Caucasian (or Iberian-Caucasian) is a proposed language family suggested by Georgian linguist Arnold Chikobava of the three language families that are specific to the Caucasus mountains region of Eurasia.

- Ibero-Caucasian languages would include:
  - South Caucasian, also called Kartvelian.
  - Northwest Caucasian, also called Abkhazo-Adyghean.
  - Northeast Caucasian, also called Nakh–Dagestanian.

The Ibero-Caucasian phylum would also include three extinct languages: Hattic, connected by some linguists to the Northwest (Circassian) family, and Hurrian and Urartian, connected to the Northeast (Nakh–Dagestanian) family as Alarodian languages.

== Family status ==
The affinities between the three families are disputed. A connection between the Northeast and Northwest families is seen as likely by some linguists.

On the other hand, there are no known affinities between South Caucasian and the northern languages, which are two unrelated phyla even in Greenberg's deep classification of the world's languages. "Ibero-Caucasian" therefore remains at best a convenient geographical designation.

== See also ==
- Languages of the Caucasus
