= Science and technology in the Soviet Union =

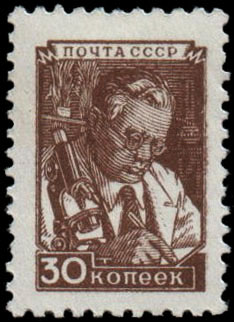
Scientist depicted on a 1955 Soviet stamp

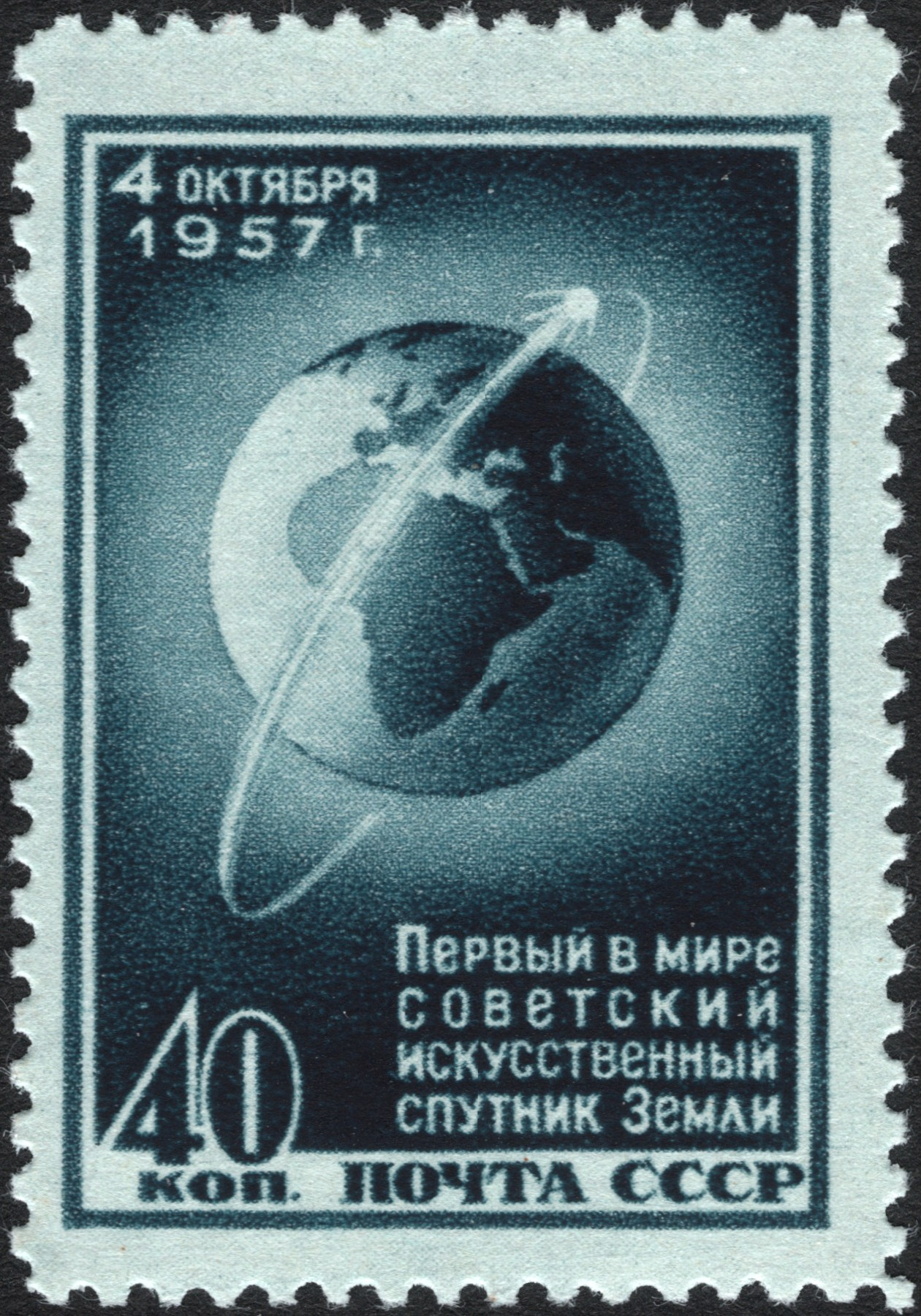
Soviet stamp showing the orbit of Sputnik 1

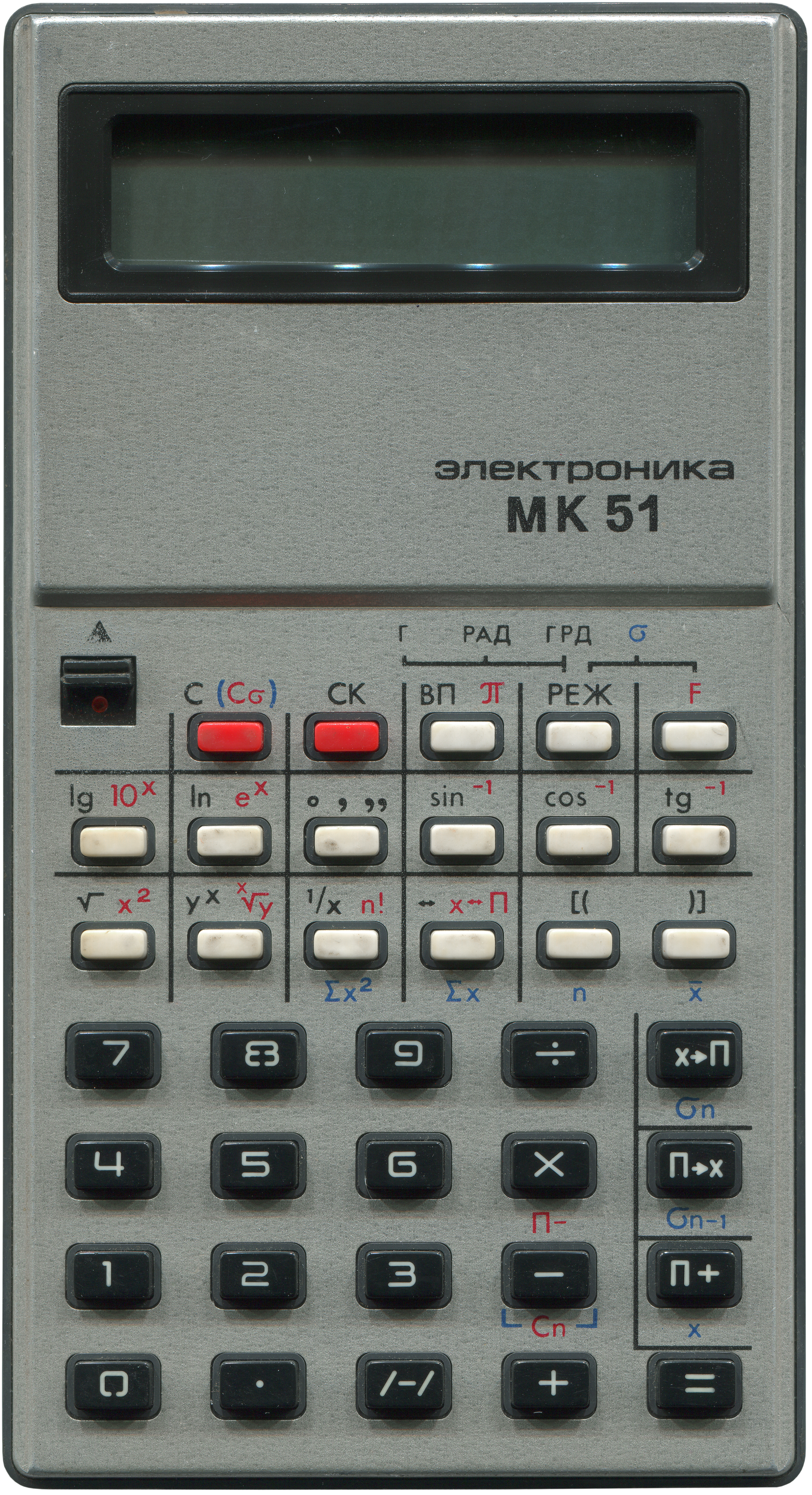
The Elektronika MK-51 calculator, introduced in 1982.

Science and technology in the Soviet Union served as an important part of national politics, practices, and identity. From the time of Lenin until the dissolution of the USSR in the early 1990s, both science and technology were intimately linked to the ideology and practical functioning of the Soviet state and were pursued along paths both similar and distinct from models in other countries. Many great scientists who worked in Imperial Russia, such as Konstantin Tsiolkovsky, continued work in the USSR and gave birth to Soviet science.

The Soviet government made the development and advancement of science a national priority, emphasizing science at all levels of education and showering top scientists with honours. Very large numbers of engineers graduated every year. Soviet scientists won acclaim in several fields, marked by a highly developed pure science and innovation at the theoretical level, though interpretation and application fell short. They were at the cutting edge of science in fields such as mathematics and in several branches of physical science, notably theoretical nuclear physics, chemistry, and astronomy. The physical chemist and physicist Nikolay Semenov was the first Soviet citizen to win a Nobel Prize, in 1956 among several other Soviet Nobel Prize winners and the mathematician Sergei Novikov was the first Soviet citizen to win a Fields Medal in 1970 followed by Grigory Margulis in 1978 and Vladimir Drinfeld in 1990.

Soviet technology was most highly developed in the fields of nuclear physics, where the arms race with the West convinced policy makers to set aside sufficient resources for research. Due to a crash program directed by Igor Kurchatov (based on spies of the Cambridge Five), the Soviet Union was the second nation to develop an atomic bomb, in 1949, four years after the United States. The Soviet Union detonated a hydrogen bomb in 1953, a mere ten months after the United States. Space exploration was also highly developed: in October 1957 the Soviet Union launched the first artificial satellite, Sputnik 1, into orbit; in April 1961 a Soviet cosmonaut, Yuri Gagarin, became the first man in space. The Soviets maintained a strong space program until economic problems led to cutbacks in the 1980s. The Soviet Union also had more scientists and engineers, relative to the world population, than any other major country due to the strong levels of state support for scientific developments by the 1980s.

Although the sciences were less rigorously censored than other fields such as art, there were several examples of suppression of ideas. In the most notorious, agronomist Trofim Lysenko refused to accept the chromosome theory of heredity usually accepted by modern genetics. Claiming his theories corresponded to Marxism, he managed to talk Joseph Stalin in 1948 into banning the practice and teaching of population genetics and several other related fields of biological research; however, this decision was reversed in the 1960s. Cybernetics was also marginalised during the Stalinist period and received a hostile public campaign in 1951. Although, the discipline was rehabilitated during the post-Stalinist period from 1954 until 1959.

== Organization ==
During the 1920s, Soviet leadership particularly emphasized scientific development. The Soviet planned economy provided significant support for state-led development of "planned science." According to academic Loren R. Graham, "No previous government in history was so openly and energetically in favor of science."

Unlike some Western countries, most of the research work in the USSR was conducted not at universities, but at specially set up research institutes. The more prestigious of them were parts of the USSR Academy of Sciences; others were within the system of specialized academies, or the research arms of various government ministries.

The core of fundamental science was the USSR Academy of Sciences, originally set up in 1925 and moved from Leningrad to Moscow in 1934. It consisted of 250 research institutes and 60,500 full-time researchers in 1987, a large percentage in the natural sciences such as biology.

All of the union's republics except the Russian Soviet Federative Socialist Republic had their own republican academies of science, while the Urals, Siberian, and Far Eastern regional branches of the academy coordinated fundamental science in Eastern Russia.

Medical research was coordinated by the USSR Academy of Medical Sciences (Академия медицинских наук СССР), which after 1992 was reorganized into the Russian Academy of Medical Sciences (Российская академия медицинских наук).

Agricultural research was organized under the aegis of the All-Union Academy of Agricultural Sciences of the Soviet Union.

=== Scientific Research Institutes (NII) ===
A large part of research was conducted in NIIs — "scientific research institutes" (Russian: НИИ, нау́чно-иссле́довательский институ́т). There have been a great number of NIIs, each specialized in a particular field.

- Ioffe Physico-Technical Institute founded 1918
- Institute of Anthropology and Ethnography founded 1933
- Institute for Physical Problems founded 1934
- Moscow Institute of Physics and Technology founded 1946
- Institute of Radio-engineering and Electronics founded 1954
- Joint Institute for Nuclear Research founded 1956
- Novosibirsk TB Research Institute founded 1943

== Ideological restrictions on science ==
Already in the 1920s, certain fields of scientific research were labeled "bourgeois" and "idealist" by the Communist Party. All research, including natural sciences, was to be founded on the philosophy of dialectical materialism. Humanities and social sciences were additionally tested for strict accordance with historical materialism.

After World War II, many scientists were forbidden from cooperation with foreign researchers. The scientific community of the Soviet Union became increasingly closed. In addition to that, the party continued declaring various new theories "pseudo-scientific". Genetics, pedology and psychotechnics were already banned in 1936 by a special decree of the Central Committee. On August 7, 1948, the V.I. Lenin Academy of Agricultural Sciences announced that from that point on Lamarckian inheritance, the theory that personality traits acquired during life are passed on to offspring, would be taught as "the only correct theory". Soviet scientists were forced to redact prior work, and even after this ideology, known as Lysenkoism, was demonstrated to be false, it took many years for criticism of it to become acceptable. After the 1960s, during the Khrushchev Thaw, a policy of liberalization of science was implemented, but the policy of Lysenkoism continued. Lysenkoism was officially renounced in 1964, after Leonid Brezhnev came to power.

== After Soviet collapse ==
After the collapse of the Soviet Union in 1991, rapid inflation and decline in governmental revenues caused the scientific establishment to lose much of its funding and stability for the first time since the 1920s. Salaries were not paid for months, and research monies disappeared. International organizations offered aid programs to discourage emigration. In general, however, the Russian scientific community has been slow to recover from the political and economic shocks of the 1990s.

== Soviet Nobel Prize winners in science ==
The following Soviet scientists were recipients of a Nobel Prize.

=== Physics ===
- 1958 Pavel Cherenkov, Ilya Frank and Igor Tamm "for the discovery and interpretation of the Cherenkov effect"
- 1962 Lev Landau "for his theories about condensed matter, particularly about liquid helium superfluidity"
- 1964 Nikolay Basov and Aleksandr Prokhorov "for fundamental work in the area of the quantum electronics, which led to the construction of oscillators and amplifiers based on the maser laser principle"
- 1978 Pyotr Kapitsa "for his fundamental inventions and discoveries in Cryophysics"
- 2001 Zhores Alferov (RU) "for the development of semiconductor heterostructures for high-speed and opto-electronics" (working in the time of the USSR)
- 2003 Alexei Abrikosov (RU), Vitaly Ginzburg (RU) "for innovative work in the theory about superconductors" (working in the time of the USSR)

=== Chemistry ===
- 1956 Nikolai Semenov For outstanding work on the mechanism of chemical transformation including an exhaustive analysis of the application of the chain theory to varied reactions (1934–1954) and, more significantly, to combustion processes. He proposed a theory of degenerate branching, which led to a better understanding of the phenomena associated with the induction periods of oxidation processes.

== National Prizes ==
The most prestigious government prize awarded for achievements in science and technology was originally the Stalin Prize. After the death of Stalin, the Stalin Prize was renamed the USSR State Prize, and the new Lenin Prize became the top award.

== See also ==
- Bibliography of science and technology in Russia and the Soviet Union
- Cybernetics in the Soviet Union
- Lysenkoism
- Science and technology in Russia
- Sharashka
- Soviet Antarctic Expedition
- Soviet cosmonauts
- Soviet explorers
- Soviet inventions
- Soviet inventors
- Soviet scientists
- Stalin and the Scientists
- Suppressed research in the Soviet Union
