= Former Soviet Union Demilitarization Act of 1992 =

United States federal law

- Other short titles: Armament Retooling and Manufacturing Support Act of 1992; Army National Guard Combat Readiness Reform Act of 1992; Cuban Democracy Act of 1992; Defense Conversion, Reinvestment, and Transition Assistance Act of 1992; Iran-Iraq Arms Non-Proliferation Act of 1992; Military Construction Authorization Act for Fiscal Year 1993; Panama Canal Commission Authorization Act for Fiscal Year 1993; Service Members Occupational Conversion and Training Act of 1992; Weapons of Mass Destruction Control Act of 1992
- Long title: An Act to authorize appropriations for fiscal year 1993 for military activities of the Department of Defense, for military construction, and for defense activities of the Department of Energy, to prescribe personnel strengths for fiscal year for the Armed Forces, to provide for defense conversion, and for other purposes.
- Acronyms (colloquial): FSUMA
- Nicknames: National Defense Authorization Act for Fiscal Year 1993
- Enacted by: the 102nd United States Congress
- Effective: October 23, 1992

Citations
- Public law: 102-484
- Statutes at Large: 106 Stat. 2315 aka 106 Stat. 2563

Codification
- Titles amended: 22 U.S.C.: Foreign Relations and Intercourse
- U.S.C. sections created: 22 U.S.C. ch. 68, subch. I § 5901 et seq.; 22 U.S.C. ch. 68, subch. II § 5911; 22 U.S.C. ch. 68, subch. III §§ 5921-5922; 22 U.S.C. ch. 68, subch. IV § 5931

Legislative history
- Introduced in the House as H.R. 5006 by Les Aspin (D-WI) on April 29, 1992; Committee consideration by House Armed Services, Senate Armed Services; Passed the House on June 5, 1992 (198-168, Roll call vote 172, via Clerk.House.gov); Passed the Senate on September 19, 1992 (passed voice vote); Reported by the joint conference committee on October 1, 1992; agreed to by the House on October 3, 1992 (304-100, Roll call vote 461, via Clerk.House.gov) and by the Senate on October 5, 1992 (agreed unanimous consent); Signed into law by President George H. W. Bush on October 23, 1992

Former Soviet Union Demilitarization Act of 1992, 22 U.S.C. ch. 68 §§ 5901-5931, is a United States Federal law created to coordinate disarmament efforts with the former Soviet Union. The Act, better known as the National Defense Authorization Act for Fiscal Year 1993, provided legislative authority for the United States Department of Defense supporting armament retooling, chemical demilitarization, and nonproliferation initiatives.

The H.R. 5006 Act of Congress acknowledged the current geopolitical events of the early 1990s with respect to the collapse of communism, dissolution of the Soviet Union, fall of the Berlin Wall, and the Gulf War. Title XIV — Demilitarization of the Former Soviet Union was passed by the 102nd U.S. Congressional session and enacted by George H. W. Bush on October 23, 1992.

== Articles of the Act ==
The Former Soviet Union Demilitarization Act was authored as five subtitles providing authority, facilitation logistics, and U.S. federal funding for allocations of the Act.

=== Subtitle A : Short Title ===
Title XIV is cited as the Former Soviet Union Demilitarization Act of 1992

=== Subtitle B : Findings and Program Authority ===
==== Demilitarization of the Independent States of the Former Soviet Union ====
The U.S. Congress determined in the national security interest of the United States —

(1) Facilitate, on a priority basis —

(A) The transportation, storage, safeguarding, and destruction of nuclear and other weapons of the independent states of the former Soviet Union, including the safe and secure storage of fissile materials, dismantlement of missiles and launchers, and the elimination of biological warfare and chemical warfare capabilities
(B) The prevention of proliferation of weapons of mass destruction and their components and destabilizing conventional weapons of the independent states of the former Soviet Union, and the establishment of verifiable safeguards against the proliferation of such weapons
(C) The prevention of diversion of weapons-related scientific expertise of the former Soviet Union to terrorist groups or Third World countries
(D) Other efforts designed to reduce the military threat from the former Soviet Union

(2) Support the demilitarization of the massive defense related industry and equipment of the independent states of the former Soviet Union and conversion of such industry and equipment to civilian purposes and uses
(3) Expand military-to-military contacts between the United States and the independent states of the former Soviet Union

==== Authority for Programs to Facilitate Demilitarization ====
(a) Notwithstanding any other provision of law, the President is authorized to establish and conduct programs to assist the demilitarization of the independent states of the former Soviet Union
(b) The programs are limited to —

(1) Transporting, storing, safeguarding, and destroying chemical, nuclear, and other weapons of the independent states of the former Soviet Union, as described in the Soviet Nuclear Threat Reduction Act of 1991
(2) Establishing verifiable safeguards against the proliferation of such weapons and their components
(3) Preventing diversion of weapons-related scientific expertise of the former Soviet Union to terrorist groups or Third World countries
(4) Facilitating the demilitarization of the defense industries of the former Soviet Union and the conversion of military technologies and capabilities into civilian activities
(5) Establishing science and technology centers in the independent states of the former Soviet Union for the purpose of engaging weapons scientists, engineers, and other experts previously involved with nuclear, chemical, and other weapons in productive, nonmilitary undertakings
(6) Expanding military-to-military contacts between the United States and the independent states of the former Soviet Union

(c) The programs, to the extent feasible, draw upon United States technology and expertise, especially from the United States private sector
(d) United States assistance authorized may not be provided unless the President certifies to the Congress, on an annual basis, that the proposed recipient country is committed to —

(1) Making a substantial investment of its resources for dismantling or destroying such weapons of mass destruction, if such recipient has an obligation under a treaty or other agreement to destroy or dismantle any such weapons
(2) Forgoing any military modernization program that exceeds legitimate defense requirements and forgoing the replacement of destroyed weapons of mass destruction
(3) Forgoing any use in new nuclear weapons of fissionable or other components of destroyed nuclear weapons
(4) Facilitating United States verification of any weapons destruction carried out under the Soviet Nuclear Threat Reduction Act of 1991
(5) Complying with all relevant arms control agreements
(6) Observing internationally recognized human rights, including the protection of minorities

=== Subtitle C : Administrative and Funding Authorities ===
==== Administration of Demilitarization Programs ====
(1) In recognition of the direct contributions to the national security interests of the United States of the activities specified, funds transferred are authorized to be made available to carry out this title. Of the amount available to carry out this title —

(A) not more than $40,000,000 may be made available for programs relating to demilitarization of defense industries
(B) not more than $15,000,000 may be made available for programs relating to military-to-military contacts
(C) not more than $25,000,000 may be made available for joint research development programs
(D) not more than $10,000,000 may be made available for the study, assessment, and identification of nuclear waste disposal activities by the former Soviet Union in the Arctic region
(E) not more than $25,000,000 may be made available for Project PEACE
(F) not more than $10,000,000 may be made available for the Volunteers Investing in Peace and Security (VIPS) program

(2) Soviet Nuclear Threat Reduction Act of 1991 is amended by striking out $400,000,000 and inserting in lieu thereof $800,000,000

=== Subtitle D : Reporting Requirements ===
==== Prior Notice to Congress of Obligation of Funds ====
(a) Not less than 15 days before obligating any funds made available for a program under this title, the President shall transmit to the Congress a report on the proposed obligation. Each such report shall specify —

(1) the account, budget activity, and particular program or programs from which the funds proposed to be obligated are to be derived and the amount of the proposed obligation
(2) the activities and forms of assistance under this title for which the President plans to obligate such funds, including the projected involvement of United States Government agencies and departments and the United States private sector

(b) Any report that covers proposed industrial demilitarization projects shall contain additional information to assist the Congress in determining the merits of the proposed projects. Such information shall include descriptions of —

(1) the facilities to be demilitarized
(2) the types of activities conducted at those facilities and of the types of nonmilitary activities planned for those facilities
(3) the forms of assistance to be provided by the United States Government and by the United States private sector
(4) the extent to which military production capability will consequently be eliminated at those facilities
(5) the mechanisms to be established for monitoring progress on those projects

==== Quarterly Reports on Programs ====
Not later than 30 days after the end of the last fiscal year quarter of fiscal year 1992 and not later than 30 days after the end of each fiscal year quarter of fiscal yesur 1993, the President shall transmit to the Congress a report on the activities carried out under this title. Each such report shall set forth, for the preceding fiscal year quarter and cumulatively, the following:

(1) The amounts expended for such activities and the purposes for which they were expended.
(2) The source of the funds obligated for such activities, specified by program.
(3) A description of the participation of all United States Government departments and agencies and the United States private sector in such activities.
(4) A description of the activities carried out under this title and the forms of assistance provided under this title, including, with respect to proposed industrial demilitarization projects, additional information on the progress toward demilitarization of facilities and the conversion of the demilitarized facilities to civilian activities.
(5) Such other information as the President considers appropriate to fully inform the Congress concerning the operation of the programs authorized under this title.

=== Subtitle E : Joint Research and Development Programs ===
==== Programs with States of Former Soviet Union ====
United States Congress encourages the Secretary of Defense to participate actively in joint research and development programs with the independent states of the former Soviet Union through the nongovernmental foundation established for this purpose by the FREEDOM Support Act of 1992. To that end, the Secretary of Defense may spend those funds authorized for support, technical cooperation, in-kind assistance, and other activities with the following purposes:

(1) To advance defense conversion by funding civilian collaborative research and development projects between scientists and engineers in the United States and in the independent states of the former Soviet Union.
(2) To assist the establishment of a market economy in the independent states of the former Soviet Union by promoting, identifying, and partially funding joint research, development, and demonstration ventures between United States businesses and scientists, engineers, and entrepreneurs in those independent states.
(3) To provide a mechanism for scientists, engineers, and entrepreneurs in the independent states of the former Soviet Union to develop an understanding of commercial business practices by establishing linkages to United States scientists, engineers, and businesses.
(4) To provide access for United States businesses to sophisticated new technologies, talented researchers, and potential new markets within the independent states of the former Soviet Union.
(5) To provide productive research and development opportunities within the independent states of the former Soviet Union that offer scientists and engineers alternatives to emigration and help prevent proliferation of weapons technologies and the dissolution of the technological infrastructure of those states.

== See also ==
- 12th Chief Directorate
- Decommissioning of Russian nuclear-powered vessels
- List of Soviet Union–United States summits
- New World Order
- Nuclear arms race
- Nuclear disarmament
- Nunn–Lugar Cooperative Threat Reduction
- Partnership for Peace
- Soviet Scientists Immigration Act of 1992
- START I
