= Marxism and Problems of Linguistics =

1950 article by Joseph Stalin

"Marxism and Problems of Linguistics" (Russian: Марксизм и вопросы языкознания, romanized: Marksizm i voprosy yazykoznaniya) is an article written by Joseph Stalin, most of which was first published on 20 June 1950, in the newspaper Pravda (the "answers" attached at the end came later, in July and August), and was in the same year published as a pamphlet in large numbers.

The article appeared in the context of the last wave of publications by followers of Nikolai Marr who supported the Japhetic theory, attacking the "old" linguistics, that had started in Pravda on 9 May 1950. Yet, instead of supporting Marr's linguistic theories, Stalin brought the campaign into a full turn, decisively ending the acceptability of Marr's theories in Soviet science. The "discussion" in the paper lingered a little while longer but did not bring much new, due to the impossibility of arguing with Stalin, and the field of Soviet linguistics was effectively shifted. The next year, the Academy of Sciences published a hardbound volume of commentaries named "Session of the Department of Social Sciences of the Academy of Sciences of the USSR devoted to the anniversary of the publication of 'Marxism and Problems of Linguistics'", running a print of 10,000.

After the publication of this article, Marr's theories were largely abandoned by Soviet linguists, and an emphasis on Russian language research was promoted instead.

== Bibliography ==
- Pollock, Ethan (2006). Stalin and the Soviet Science Wars. Princeton, New Jersey: Princeton University Press. ISBN 978-0-691-12467-4.
- Stalin, Joseph (2000) [Orig. published in 20 June, 4 July, and 2 August 1950 issues of Pravda]. "Marxism and Problems of Linguistics". Marxists Internet Archive. Reproduced from Stalin, J. (1954). Marxism and Problems of Linguistics. Moscow: Foreign Languages Publishing House.
