= Aleksandr Maksimov (ethnographer) =

Soviet ethnographer

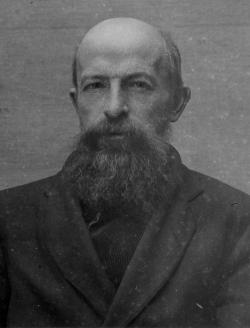
- Born: 13 August 1872; Oryol
- Died: 24 April 1941 (aged 68); Moscow
- Occupation: Ethnologist

Aleksandr Nikolayevich Maksimov (Russian: Александр Николаевич Максимов; 13 August 1872 – 24 April 1941) was a Soviet ethnographer who focused on the history of the family, the clan and the economy.

== Career ==
Aleksandr Maksimov was born in Oryol on 13 August 1872. He became a member of the circle formed by A.I. Ryazanov, although he did not immediately adopt the Marxist creeds of its leader. In 1894 he was arrested and deported to Arkhangelsk Governorate. There he became interested on ethnology. After returning to Moscow, Maksimov was made head of the ethnographic department of the Society of the Aficionados of the Natural Sciences, Anthropology and Ethnography (OLEAE), and for many years contributed book reviews to the Etnograficheskoe Obozrenie, gaining recognition and respect among Russian ethnographers. Between 1900 and 1917 he published a number of papers that attacked the evolutionist view of the way in which kinship and social organizations had developed. He was a professor at Moscow State University from 1919 to 1930, and a bibliographer at the V. I. Lenin State Library from 1919 to 1935.

Maksimov died on 24 April 1941 in Moscow.

== Views ==
Maksimov belonged to the school of ethnologists in Russia that depended on foreign literature for information on hunter-gatherers in other parts of the world, as opposed to those who concentrated on a careful study of ethnic groups within the country. He rejected some aspects of evolutionism as applied to sociology. In this, he was out of step with Soviet ethnography, which followed the research line of evolutionism. Maksimov attended a major gathering of ethnologists in Moscow between 28 December 1909 and 6 January 1910, the largest such meeting in the Russian Empire, where he was a keynote speaker. Maksimov argued against evolutionism, going against the views of most of the leading ethnologists present. Although not a field researcher himself, he was suspicious of theoretical generalizations and praised careful, focused studies of specific institutions and peoples in the field.

In 1926 Maksimov was a consultant to the Council of Nationalities of the Central Executive Committee of the Soviet Union, involved in a debate over how to determine which narodnost, or ethnic group, people belonged to in a forthcoming census. A census taker would interview the respondent, but what if the census taker did not believe the respondent's answer? Maksimov favored accepting the respondent's answer, and changing the question to say "what narodnost do you consider that you belong to?" He felt that this would allow for cases where people had changed their ethnic identification, rather than forcing an identification based on past history. Sergei Aleksandrovich Tokarev was a follower of Maksimov, who believed that an ethnologist should not restrict himself to "primitive" people, but should study people at all stages of development.

== Bibliography ==
- Maksimov, A. N. (1919). Kakiye narody zhivut v Rossii [Which Peoples Live in Russia] (in Russian). p. 125.
