= Arnold Chikobava =

Georgian linguist and philologist (1898–1985)

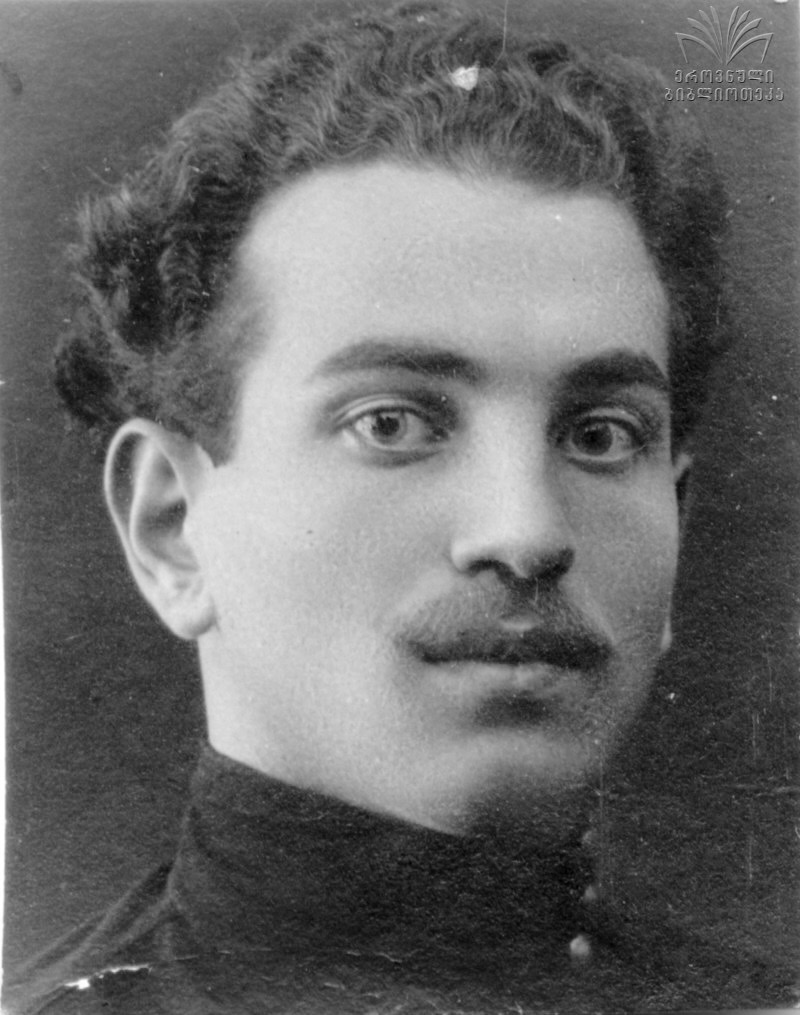
- Arnold Chikobava in his youth
- Born: 14 March 1898; Sachikobavo, Kutaisi Governorate, Russian Empire
- Died: 5 November 1985 (aged 87); Tbilisi, Georgian SSR, Soviet Union

Arnold Stephanes dze Chikobava (Georgian: არნოლდ სტეფანეს ძე ჩიქობავა; March 14 (26), 1898 – November 5, 1985) was a Georgian linguist and philologist best known for his contributions to Caucasian studies and for being one of the most active critics of Nicholas Marr's controversial monogenetic "Japhetic" theory of language.

== Biography ==
Chikobava was born in the small village of Sachikobavo in the Samegrelo region of western Georgia, then part of Imperial Russia. He was initially named Benedicte Chikobava but later changed his name to Arnold in order to differentiate himself from another Georgian academic named Benedicte Chikobava, who had caused some controversy in local newspapers and was being confused with the other Chikobava.

He graduated from the recently established Tbilisi State University in 1922 and earned a degree there, later serving as a docent (1926–33) and professor (1933-85). For years, he headed the Department of Caucasian Studies at Tbilisi State University (1933–60), and the Department of Ibero-Caucasian languages at the Institute of Linguistics in Tbilisi (1936–85). The institute, briefly directed by Chikobava from 1950 to 1952, now bears his name.

In 1941, he became one of the founding members of the Georgian Academy of Sciences and was elected to its Presidium from 1950 to 1963. For his prolific work, he was awarded numerous Soviet and international prizes and titles. He authored a series of Georgian dictionaries and influential works on the structure and history of Caucasian languages.

Most of his fame, however, came through his criticism of Marr's speculative linguistic theory that had been adopted, for a while, as an official ideology by Soviet scholars. While most of Marr's opponents came under heavy pressure from the Soviet authorities, Chikobava benefited from his friendship with the First Secretary of the Georgian Central Committee, Kandid Charkviani, and continued his attacks against Marr's hypotheses. Finally, he sent his report to Joseph Stalin; he met Stalin personally in 1950. Soon, Stalin denounced Marr's theory in his famous Pravda article on linguistics (one ghostwriter was, most probably, Chikobava himself).

Chikobava died in Tbilisi at the age of 87. He was buried on the grounds of Tbilisi State University.

== Selected publications ==
- Проблема простого предложения в грузинском языке. 1928; 2-е изд. 1968. (The problem of the simple sentence in Georgian. (In Russian.) 1928, 2nd ed. 1968.
- Грамматический анализ чанского (лазского) диалекта с текстами. Тб., 1936. (Grammatical analysis of the Chan (Laz) dialect with texts. (In Russian.) Tbilisi 1936.)
- Чанско-мегрельско-грузинский словарь. 1938. (Laz-Mingrelian-Georgian Dictionary. (In Russian.) 1938.)
- Проблема эргативной конструкции в иберийско-кавказских языках. 1948. (The problem of the ergative construction in the Caucasian languages. (In Russian.) 1948.)
- Введение в языкознание. 2-е изд. М., 1953. Ч. 1. (Introduction to Linguistics. (In Russian.) Part I. 2nd ed., Moscow 1953.)
- Проблема языка как предмета языкознания. М., 1959. (The problem of language as subject of linguistics. (In Russian.) Moscow 1959.)
- (B соавт. с И. Церцвадзе.) Аварский язык. 1962. (With I. Cercvadze: The Avar Language. (In Russian.) 1962.)
- История изучения иберийско-кавказских языков. 1965. (History of Caucasian Linguistics. (In Russian.) 1965.)
- Проблемы родства иберийско-кавказских языков. Махачкала, 1965. (Problems of the origin of the Caucasian languages. (In Russian.) Makhachkala 1965.)
- Введение в иберийско-кавказское языкознание. 1979. (Introduction to Caucasian linguistics. (In Russian.) 1979.)
