= Stalin and the Scientists =

2016 book by Simon Ings

- First edition book cover
- Author: Simon Ings
- Cover artist: Michael Nicholson/Getty
- Language: English
- Subject: History of science, political repression, Joseph Stalin
- Published: Faber and Faber
- Publication date: 6 October 2016
- Publication place: England
- Media type: print (hardback)
- Pages: 528 (first edition)
- ISBN: 978-0-571-29007-9

Stalin and the Scientists: A History of Triumph and Tragedy 1905–1953 is a 2016 popular science non-fiction book on the history of science in the Soviet Union under Joseph Stalin by English novelist and science writer, Simon Ings. It is Ings' second non-fiction book, the first being The Eye: A Natural History (2007). He had previously published eight novels.

Stalin and the Scientists was longlisted for the 2016 Baillie Gifford Prize for Non-Fiction.

== Background ==
Ings' inspiration for Stalin and the Scientists came from Soviet psychologist, Alexander Luria's book Mind of a Mnemonist, about the life of Russian journalist and mnemonist, Solomon Shereshevsky. Ings said in 2016 interviews that Luria is often referred to as the founder of modern neuroanatomy and "the godfather of the literary genre we call popular science". "Luria's account more or less set the template for modern popular science and ... pretty much set me on the path I'm on now." Ings had considered writing a biography about Luria, but felt that while Luria's achievements were "extraordinary", considering the climate of political repression he worked in, Ings was concerned that Western readers would consider his career too ordinary, and would miss the context in which it unfolded. Ings' passion for popular science and the need to explain the context within which Luria and other Soviet scientists worked, changed what would have been a one-year "modest biography" into a "five-year behemoth" that "burned through three editors" and, Ings added, "nearly killed me".

Ings said, as a novelist, he was "absurdly under-qualified" to tackle a book like Stalin and the Scientists, but added that only a novelist could be so "ridiculously ambitious" and "naive enough to stick his or her neck out so far". Ings felt that given the kind of science prevalent in Russia at the time, perhaps this "really has to be the job of a novelist rather than a historian". Responding to statements that this is "the first history" of Soviet science, Ings said, "Certainly no-one's been foolish enough to attempt to tell the whole story of science under Stalin in a single volume, but be assured I didn't dig this entire thing single-handed from virgin ground."

== Reception ==
In a review in The Guardian, David Holloway described Stalin and the Scientists as a "fascinating story" that reveals "the tragedy and the triumph" of Soviet science. He called it a "lively book" and complimented Ings on his "clear and simple" scientific explanations, and the way he highlighted the personalities of those involved: the "brilliant scientists", the "charlatans", the "visionaries" and the "careerists". A reviewer of the book in Publishers Weekly complimented Ings on the sensitive way in which he exposed the lives of the scientists and their experiences, and how he "ably documents the challenges, failures, and achievements of Soviet science". The reviewer commented that while Ings "can be long-winded", he "engagingly fuses history, science, and storytelling".

British historian and author Simon Sebag Montefiore wrote in The New York Times that Ings "skillfully" portrays the lives of the scientists of this period. He called Ings "an entertaining storyteller who often captures the essence of things", and described the book as "lively and interesting" and full of "priceless nuggets and a cast of frauds, crackpots and tyrants". Montefiore added, however, that while Ings highlights the failures of Soviet science, he omits its successes, for example the Tupolev and MiG airplanes, and the T-34 tank. Montefiore was also critical of errors in the book, for example Stalin's birthday and Felix Dzerzhinsky's tenure as head of Cheka, the Soviet secret police.

Writing in Socialist Review, John Parrington was also critical of flaws and omissions. While he described the book as "ambitious in scope", and called it "fascinating" and "important", Parrington said it is not without "elementary errors", like Ings' statement that "the Bolsheviks ... and the Mensheviks ... missed the 1905 revolution". Parrington also complained that Ings does not explain what it was that "destroyed the hopes and dreams" of Russian scientists in the 1920s when Stalin came to power.

American science historian Loren Graham also criticised errors and omissions in the book. In a review in The Wall Street Journal, he said Ings is "a gifted writer", and called Stalin and the Scientists "a good single source" for readers new to Soviet science. But Graham felt that one of the book's shortcomings was that Ings only focuses on topics that interest him, like biology, physiology and psychology, while giving little attention to mathematics and theoretical physics. Graham also noted several "incorrect or exaggerated" statements in the book, for example: Alexei Gastev was a "leading architect of Russia's industrialisation programme"; Nikolai Bernstein "invented cybernetics"; and Stalin was "the last in a long line of European philosopher kings". Graham concluded that the book is the result of "an impressive amount of study" and "deserves attention", but "a very critical form of attention".

== See also ==
- Bibliography of science and technology in Russia and the Soviet Union

== Cited works ==
- Ings, Simon (2016). Stalin and the Scientists (e-book ed.). London: Faber and Faber. ISBN 978-0-571-29009-3.
