= Japhetic theory =

Discredited theory of linguistic relationships

In linguistics, the Japhetic hypothesis or Japhetic theory (Russian: яфетическая теория, yafeticheskaya teoriya) of Soviet linguist Nikolay Yakovlevich Marr (1864–1934) postulated that the Kartvelian languages of the Caucasus area are related to the Semitic languages of the Middle East. The hypothesis gained favor in the 1930s and '40s among some Soviet linguists for ideological reasons as it was thought to represent "proletarian science" as opposed to "bourgeois science", but also had numerous detractors, most notably Arnold Chikobava. The hypothesis finally fell into disrepute and was largely discarded after 1950, when Joseph Stalin published a scathing critique of the views of Marr and his supporters, titled "Marxism and Problems of Linguistics".

== Term ==
Marr adopted the term "Japhetic" from Japheth, the name of one of the sons of Noah, in order to characterise his hypothesis that the Kartvelian languages of the Caucasus area were related to the Semitic languages of the Middle East (named after Shem, Japheth's brother). Marr postulated a common origin of Caucasian, Semitic-Hamitic, and Basque languages. This initial hypothesis pre-dated the October Revolution (the first reference to it is made in Pan Tadeusz written by Adam Mickiewicz in the 1830s). In 1917, Marr enthusiastically endorsed the revolution, and offered his services to the new Soviet regime. He was soon accepted as the country's leading linguist.

== Hypothesis ==
Under the Soviet government, Marr developed his hypothesis to claim that Japhetic languages had existed across Europe before the advent of the Indo-European languages. They could still be recognised as a substratum over which the Indo-European languages had imposed themselves. Using this model, Marr attempted to apply the Marxist theory of class struggle to linguistics, arguing that these different strata of language corresponded to different social classes. He stated that the same social classes in widely different countries spoke versions of their own languages that were linguistically closer to one another than to the speech of other classes who supposedly spoke “the same” language. This aspect of Marr's thinking was an attempt to extend the Marxist theory of international class consciousness far beyond its original meaning, by trying to apply it to language. Marr also insisted that the notion that a people are united by common language was nothing more than false consciousness created by “bourgeois nationalism”.

To draw support for his speculative doctrine, Marr elaborated a Marxist footing for it. He hypothesized that modern languages tend to fuse into a single language of communist society. This hypothesis was the basis for a mass campaign of "Latinisation" in the 1920s and 1930s to replace the existing Cyrillic alphabets of minority languages with Latin alphabets.

Obtaining recognition of his hypothesis from Soviet officials, Marr was permitted to manage the National Library of Russia from 1926 until 1930 and the Japhetic Institute of the Academy of Sciences from 1921 until his death in 1934. He was elected vice-president of the Soviet Academy of Sciences in 1930.

In 1950, sixteen years after Marr's death, an article titled "Marxism and Problems of Linguistics", written by Joseph Stalin, was published in major Soviet periodicals. It was inspired by the writings of Marr's most energetic opponent, Arnold Chikobava, In the article, Stalin rebuts the Japhetic hypothesis, stating that "N. Ya. Marr introduced into linguistics another and also incorrect and non-Marxist formula, regarding the ‘class character’ of language, and got himself into a muddle and put linguistics into a muddle. Soviet linguistics cannot be advanced on the basis of an incorrect formula which is contrary to the whole course of the history of peoples and languages." Since then, the Japhetic hypothesis has been seen as deeply flawed, both inside and outside the former Soviet Union, but some of Marr's surviving students continued to defend and develop it into the late 1960s.

== See also ==
- Georgy Danilov
- Dené-Caucasian languages
- Khazar theory
- Lemurian Tamil
- Lysenkoism
- Proto-language
- Sun Language Theory
