= Nikolai Marr =

Georgian ethnologist and linguist (1865–1934)

- ნიკოლოზ იაკობის ძე მარი (Georgian); Николай Яковлевич Марр (Russian)
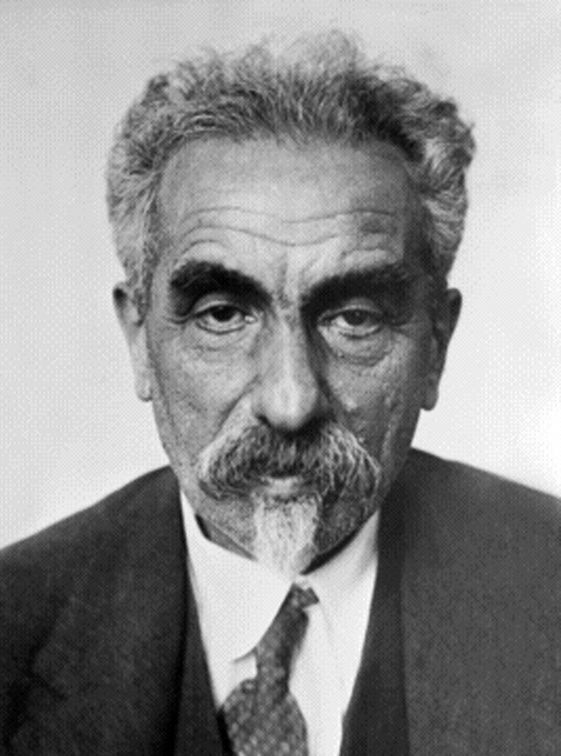
- Nikolai Marr, c. 1930s
- Born: Nikoloz Iakobis dze Mari; 25 December 1864; Kutaisi, Kutais Governorate, Russian Empire
- Died: 20 December 1934 (aged 69); Leningrad, Russian SFSR, USSR
- Known for: Japhetic theory

Academic background
- Education: St Petersburg University

Academic work
- Discipline: Linguistics

Nikolai Yakovlevich Marr (Никола́й Я́ковлевич Марр, Nikolay Yakovlevich Marr; ნიკოლოზ იაკობის ძე მარი, Nikoloz Iak'obis dze Mari; 6 January 1865 [O.S. 25 December 1864] — 20 December 1934) was a Georgian-born historian and linguist who gained a reputation as a scholar of the Caucasus during the 1910s before embarking on his "Japhetic theory" on the origin of language (from 1924), now considered as pseudo-scientific, and related speculative linguistic hypotheses.

Marr's hypotheses were used as a rationale in the campaign during the 1920–30s in the Soviet Union of introduction of Latin alphabets for smaller ethnicities of the country. In 1950, the "Japhetic theory" fell from official favour, with Joseph Stalin denouncing it in "Marxism and Problems of Linguistics".

== Biography ==
Marr was born on 6 January 1865 [O.S. 25 December 1864] in Kutaisi, Georgia (then part of the Russian Empire). His father, James Montague Marr (1793–1874), was an Englishman of possible Scottish descent who moved to the Caucasus in 1822 to work as a trader, before moving into horticulture, and worked with the Gurieli family of Guria. His mother was a young Georgian woman (Agrafina Magularia). Marr's parents spoke different languages (James spoke English and Agrafina spoke the Gurian dialect of Georgian), and thus could hardly understand each other. When Marr was 8 his father died, leaving the family in difficult circumstances.

In 1874 Marr was accepted into a Kutaisi boarding school, after his mother successfully secured funding from the local authorities for him. While a good student, Marr was nearly expelled as he was often in conflict with the school administration. He entered Department of Oriental Studies at St Petersburg University in 1884, where he specialized in Caucasian languages, and simultaneously studied Arabic, Persian, Turkish, Hebrew, Sanskrit, Syriac, among others. Working under Viktor Rosen, the head of the department, Marr mainly worked with manuscripts. He completed his master's degree in 1899, with his thesis titled The Collection of the Parables of Vardan.

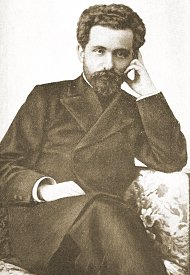
Nikolai Marr in 1905

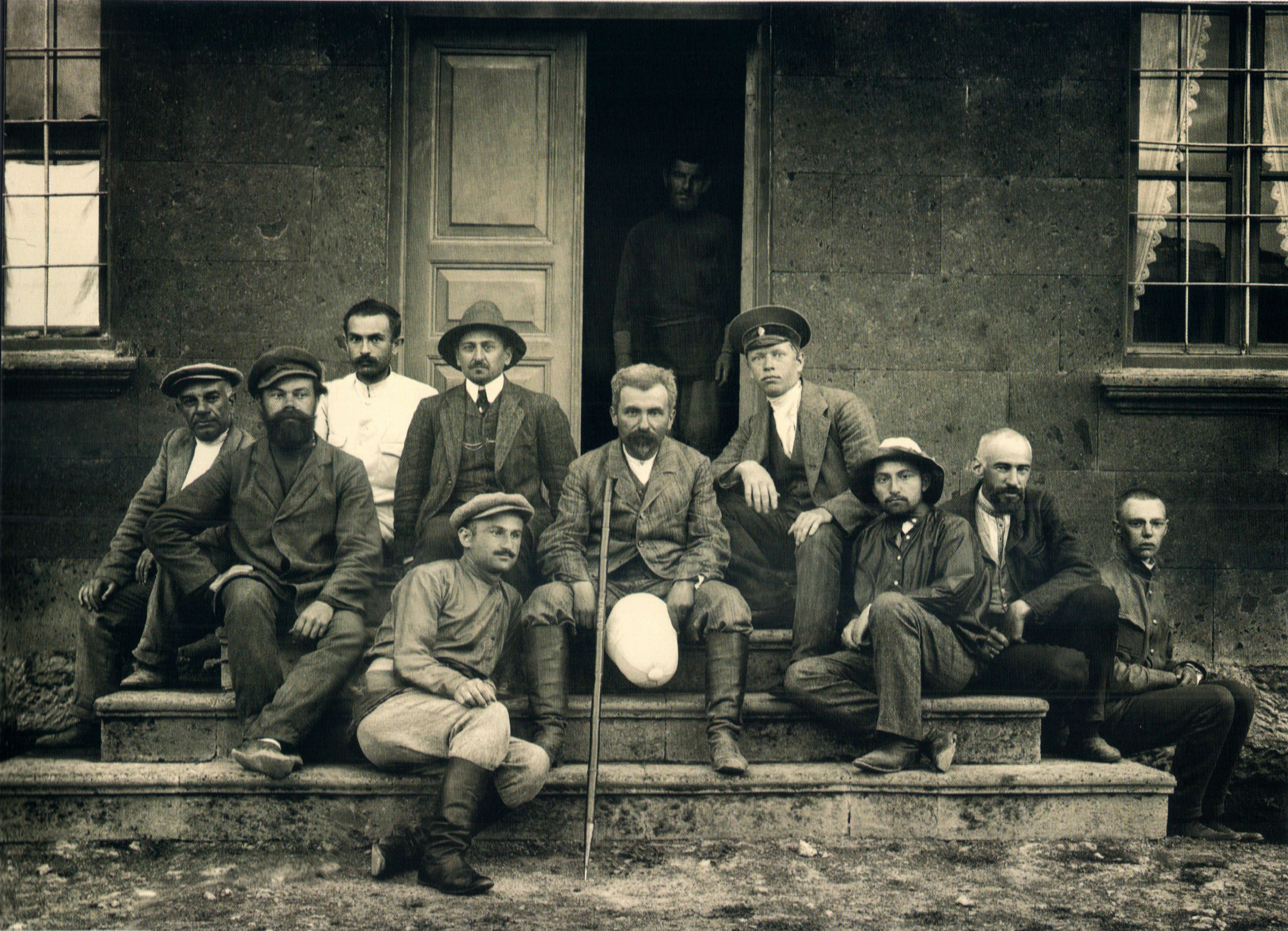
Marr's Ani expedition (1912)

After graduation, Marr taught at the university beginning in 1891, becoming dean of the Oriental faculty in 1911 and member of the Russian Academy of Sciences in 1912. From 1892 until 1917 he undertook yearly excavations at the ancient Armenian capital of Ani.

After a visit to Turkey in 1933 Marr developed influenza, followed several months later by a stroke. He died from complications of these ailments in Leningrad on 20 December 1934.

== Japhetic theory ==
Marr gained recognition with his Japhetic theory, postulating the common origin of Caucasian, Semitic-Hamitic, and Basque languages. In 1924, he went even further and proclaimed that all the languages of the world descended from a single proto-language which had consisted of four "diffused exclamations": sal, ber, yon, rosh. Although the languages undergo certain stages of development, his method of linguistic paleontology claims to make it possible to discern elements of primordial exclamations in any given language. One of his followers was Valerian Borisovich Aptekar, and one of his opponents was Arnold Chikobava.

In 1950 Marr's theories were criticized in a discussion in Pravda, culminating in a June 20, 1950, article by Stalin, "Marxism and Problems of Linguistics". After that point Marr's theories were largely abandoned by Soviet linguists, and an emphasis on Russian-language research was promoted instead.

== Publications ==
Selected works:

- Nikolai Yakovlevich Marr, Vardan (Aygektsi) (1899). Collections of proverbs Vartan. Russian Academy of Sciences.
- Nikolai Yakovlevich Marr (1910). Chan (Laz) Grammar. Type. imp. Akademіi Sciences. p. 240.
- Jah Gato, Nikolai Yakovlevich Marr (1932). Amran. The Academy. p. 162.
- Nikolai Yakovlevich Marr (1932). Tristan and Isolda: love of the heroine of feudal Europe to the matriarchal goddess Afrevrazii. Publishing House of the Academy of Sciences of the USSR. p. 286.
- Nikolai Yakovlevich Marr, Valerian Borisovich Aptekar (1934). Language and Society. State Academy of the History of Material Culture.
- Nikolay Yakovlevich Marr; Valerian Borisovich Aptekar (1936). Collected articles. Power to the Soviets. p. 207.
- Nikolai Yakovlevich Marr (1940). Description of the Georgian manuscripts of Sinai Monastery. Publishing House of the Academy of Sciences of the USSR. p. 276.

Translations:

- Allen, Matthew Carson; Young, Robert (eds., 2024). The Anticolonial Linguistics of Nikolai Marr: A Critical Reader. Taylor & Francis. ISBN 978-1-040-18277-2.

== Bibliography ==
- Cherchi, M.; Manning, H.P. (2002), Disciplines and Nations: Niko Marr vs. his Georgian students at Tbilisi State University and the Japhetidology/Caucasology schism, Carl Beck Papers in Russian and East European Studies, 1603, University of Pittsburgh Center for Russian & East European Studies
- Clark, Katerina (1995), Petersburg, Crucible of Cultural Revolution, Cambridge, Massachusetts: Harvard University Press, ISBN 978-0-67-466335-0
- Mikhankova, V.A. (1949), Николай Яковлевич Марр: Очерк его жизни и научной деятельности [Nikolai Yakovlevich Marr: Essay on his life and scientific activity] (in Russian), Moscow: Izd-vo Akademii nauk SSSR, OCLC 70250730
- Pollock, Ethan (2006), Stalin and the Soviet Science Wars, Princeton, New Jersey: Princeton University Press, ISBN 978-0-691-12467-4
- Rayfield, Donald (16 March 2015), Nikolai Marr - a talk by Donald Rayfield 17 February, British Georgian Society
- Sériot, P., ed. (2005), Un paradigme perdu: la linguistique marriste [A Lost Paradigm: Marrist Linguistics], Cahiers de l'ILSL, No 20, Université de Lausanne
- Slezkine, Yuri (Winter 1996), "N. Ia. Marr and the National Origins of Soviet Ethnogenetics", Slavic Review, 55 (4): 826–862, doi:10.2307/2501240, JSTOR 2501240, S2CID 163569693
- Tolz, Vera (1997), Russian Academicians and the Revolution: Combining Professionalism and Politics, Houndmills, Basingstoke, Hampshire: Macmillan Press, ISBN 0-333-69811-8
- Tolz, Vera (2005), Russia's Own Orient: The Politics of Identity and Oriental Studies in the Late Imperial and Early Soviet Periods, Oxford: Oxford University Press, ISBN 978-0-19-959444-3
- Tuite, K. (2011), "The reception of Marr and Marrism in the Soviet Georgian academy" (PDF), in Mühlfried, Florian; Sokolovsky, Sergey (eds.), Exploring the Edge of Empire: Soviet Era Anthropology in the Caucasus and Central Asia, Halle Studies in the Anthropology of Eurasia, Halle: LIT Verlag, pp. 197–214
- Velmezova, Ekaterina (2007), Les lois du sens: la sémantique marriste [The laws of meaning: Marrist semantics] (in French), Bern: Peter Lang, ISBN 978-3-03911-208-1
