= Japanese Russian =

Japanese Russian or Russian Japanese may refer to:

- Japanese-Russian relations (cf. "a Japanese-Russian treaty")
- Japanese language education in Russia (cf. "Russian Japanese education")
  - Cyrillization of Japanese

== See also ==
- Japanese people in Russia
- Russians in Japan
