= Evgeni Spalvin =

Latvian-Russian orientalist and Japanologist (1872–1933)

Yevgeny Spalvin
- Latvian: Eižens Spalviņš
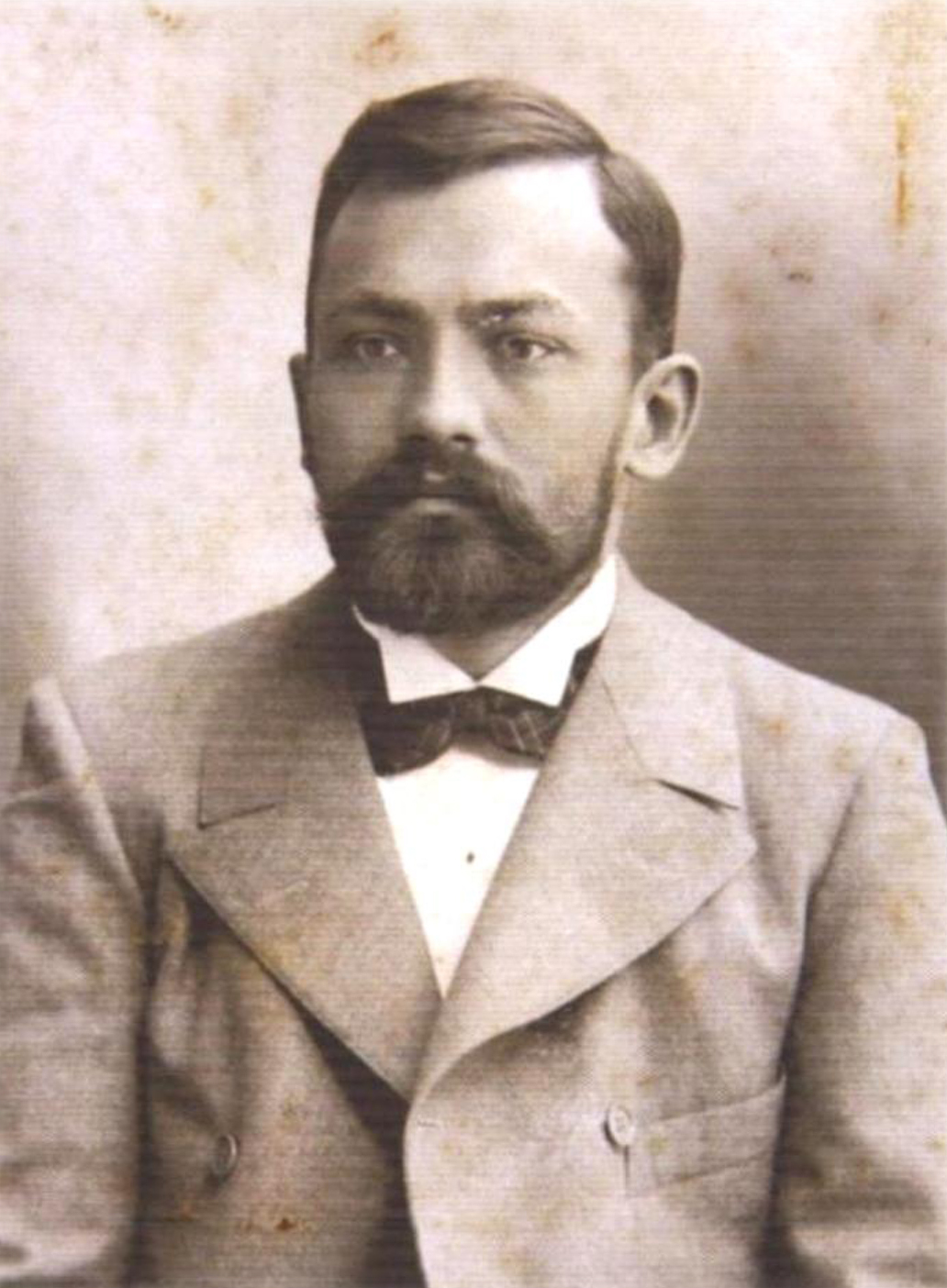
- Born: 11 October 1872; Ādzele (Gaujiena), Governorate of Livonia, Russian Empire
- Died: 10 November 1933 (aged 61); Harbin, Manchukuo
- Citizenship: Russian Empire → Soviet Union
- Education: Faculty of Oriental Studies, Saint Petersburg State University
- Known for: Organizer of practical Oriental studies in the Russian Far East
- Awards: Order of St. Vladimir, 4th class Order of St. Anna, 2nd class Order of Saint Stanislaus, 2nd class
- Scientific career
- Fields: Japanese studies
- Workplaces: Oriental Institute (Vladivostok) → Far Eastern State University
- Notable students: P. G. Vaskevich, V. M. Mendrin

Yevgeny Spalvin (Latvian: Eižens Spalviņš, Japanese: 須春院 or スパルウヰン; 11 October 1872, Ādzele – 10 November 1933, Harbin) was an orientalist and the first professional japanologist in Russia.

He was born into the family of a Latvian teacher, began his studies at the Faculty of Law of Petersburg University, and graduated from its Faculty of Oriental Studies in the Chinese-Mongolian-Manchu track. He was sent to Tokyo in 1899–1900 to prepare for a professorship in the department of Japanese literature, and was subsequently sent to Japan on several further occasions (1903, 1906, 1907, 1909, and 1922). After the founding of the Oriental Institute in Vladivostok, he took up the post of professor of Japanese literature there (1900). Until 1920 he combined this post with that of head of the Oriental Institute's library. In 1902–1904, he also served as a censor of the Japanese press and literature and carried out assignments for military counterintelligence. He rose to the rank of Collegiate Councillor (1916, with seniority from 1900) and was awarded the Order of St. Vladimir, 4th class (1917). In 1922–1923, he served as acting rector of the Far Eastern State University. He was cultural secretary and translator for the Soviet plenipotentiary mission in Tokyo (1925–1931), and afterward an adviser to the administration of the Chinese Eastern Railway in Harbin. He died of cardiac arrest following emergency surgery.

He was the first professional practical japanologist in Russia. His main efforts were devoted to popularizing the language, to teaching, and to producing textbooks — work to which he dedicated 25 years of his life in total. Besides teaching, he devoted much time to organizational work, notably initiating and serving as chief editor of major orientalist projects — the journals Bulletin of the Oriental Institute and Contemporary Chronicle of the Far East. He is also the author of an original Cyrillic transcription of Japanese phonetics that was used at the Oriental Institute.

Despite years of dedicated teaching work, Spalvin, who was not a linguist, did not found a scholarly school and left behind no striking scholarly ideas. In the Soviet period his name was forgotten. The first publications about Spalvin appeared only in the 1980s, and scholarly interest in his life and work, in both Russia and Japan, revived only at the beginning of the twenty-first century.

== Biography ==
=== Family, childhood, and student years (1872–1898) ===
Yevgeny Spalviņš was born on 11 October 1872 at the Adsel Castle estate (Governorate of Livonia), located roughly 150 km from Riga.

The father of the future japanologist was the Latvian Heinrihs Spalviņš (1841–1913), a writer and teacher and the author of one of the first grammars of the Latvian language (An Aid to the Study of Language and the Writing of Thoughts, published in 1879). At the age of 30 Heinrihs married the governess Elise Mekler; both were of the Lutheran faith. Their first-born was christened Eižens (the Latvian equivalent of Yevgeny); the family had six children in total — three sons and three daughters, the youngest of whom died at the age of four. In 1877 the family moved to Riga, where Heinrihs contributed to the Latvian- and German-language press (according to some accounts he owned and edited the newspaper Friend of the Latvian People) and also served as an official of the Mutual Fire Insurance Society; his salary and fees were the family's sole source of income. Heinrihs published prolifically in Latvian and German; the languages of everyday use in the Spalviņš household were German, French, and, presumably, Latvian, while at work the head of the family also had to master Russian.

All the Spalvin children (as they were known in Russian) received a good education. After finishing the Riga Cathedral School, Yevgeny received 135 rubles from his father and set off to enroll at Imperial Saint Petersburg University; in his autobiography he wrote that from then on he made his own way in life. He initially enrolled in the Faculty of Law, where he studied for three years. He had to support himself: the talented young man received a small private stipend and, over eight years, worked with Professor A. A. Isayev, translating his lectures and articles into German, and also worked with German journals and with the Social Democratic publishing house of Johann Heinrich Wilhelm Dietz in Stuttgart. The reasons for his transfer to the Faculty of Oriental Studies are unclear, but he obtained permission from the Ministry of National Education to transfer to the Chinese-Mongolian-Manchu track.

Already in his senior years at the Faculty of Oriental Studies, Spalvin was engaged by the Ministry of Finance to work on the three-volume reference work Description of Korea. In his autobiography he later stated that a substantial portion of the linguistic and political sections was his own work. In the course of this work Spalvin had to devise a practical transcription of the Korean language (he later claimed that the Koreanist Podstavin borrowed his transcription, making only minor changes). In 1898 Yevgeny Spalvin graduated from the university with top marks in twelve subjects, including the languages Chinese, Mongolian, Kalmyk, Manchu, French and English, which earned him a first-class diploma (12 July). He had not studied Japanese, although he had gained some acquaintance with it through a course on the Japanese writing system taught by Yoshibumi Kurono, and through the same instructor's course on Japanese grammar in his final year.

=== First trip to Japan and the Oriental Institute (1899–1900) ===
The student Spalvin was, by decree of the curator of the Saint Petersburg Educational District, retained to prepare for a professorship in the recently established department of Japanese literature, with a stipend of 600 rubles a year. To improve his practical command of the language, he was sent on a two-year assignment to Japan, dated from 1 January 1899. The Ministry of National Education allocated 2,000 rubles a year for the student's support; an additional 750 rubles from the university budget was envisaged, but in the end Spalvin never received this portion of the stipend. The instructions for the assignment set a demanding task: "…to study the Japanese language and literature comprehensively in the centres of learning of Japan itself, under the guidance of local scholars, and equally to become directly acquainted with the spirit of the country and its customs."

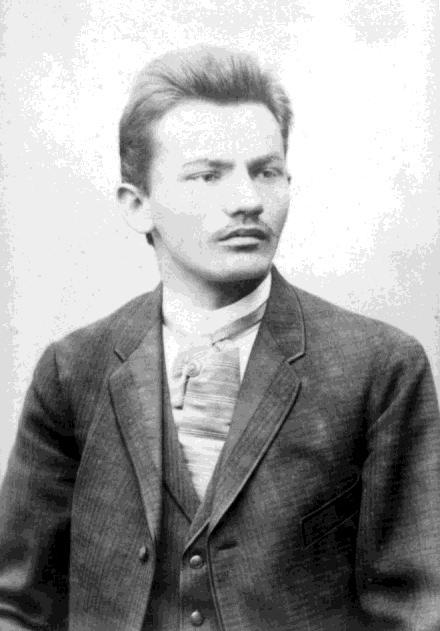
The student Spalvin

Spalvin went on a Russian Volunteer Fleet steamer from Odessa to Nagasaki. Along the way he studied English with naval officers who had been posted to the Far East. He reported to the dean, Rosen, that he had arrived in Tokyo on 18 (30) March 1899. Within a week he had begun studying Japanese. Even earlier, upon first arriving in Nagasaki, he had already realized how insufficient his training in Petersburg had been: while touring the city, the young scholar got lost, and all his attempts to communicate with the Japanese came to nothing — the need to learn the language was more than obvious. The young japanologist's first teacher was Ōbuchi Norimoto, a doctor and lawyer who before the revolution had been a vassal of the last shōgun; his fee was 20 rubles a month for daily two-hour lessons.

There were a lot of difficulties with communication and daily life accommodation: rental houses came completely unfurnished, and the 2,000-ruble annual sum covered only the barest necessities. Spalvin asked for the university stipend needed to buy books and to travel around the country, but never received it. His situation eased somewhat only in 1900: an urgent teaching vacancy arose at the Tokyo School of Foreign Languages, and the Japanese Ministry of Education invited Spalvin to take temporary work there. This allowed the scholar to hire a second language tutor, who lived in Spalvin's house and conversed with him around the clock. This tutor was Kiyotsugu Maeda, a student in the German department of the Tokyo School of Foreign Languages.

The second Japanese to give Spalvin substantial help, and to become a close friend, was the Japanese writer and translator from Russian Futabatei Shimei. It was he who advised Spalvin to read, for study purposes, not fragments of miscellaneous newspaper articles but works of fiction. Futabatei worked with Spalvin on a reading of Ozaki Kōyō's novel Many Feelings, Many Griefs, a text made difficult by unconventional readings of its characters, compounded by the absence of furigana, so that even Futabatei could not always determine the correct reading of a difficult passage at a glance and had to work it out from context.

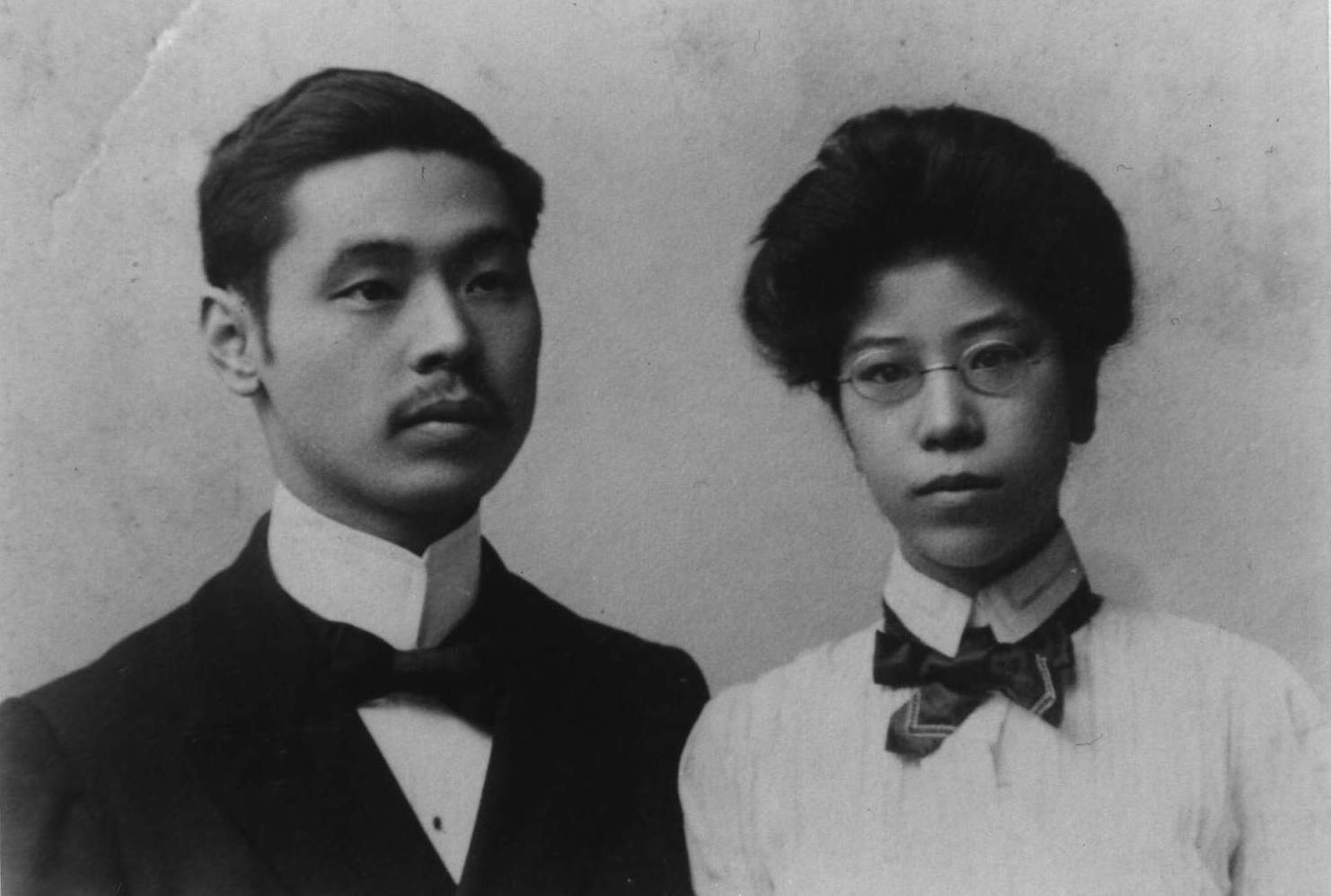
Kiyotsugu Maeda and his wife Kaoru Maeda (Vladivostok, 1904). After Kiyotsugu's death, Kaoru would marry the widowed Spalvin.

The third close friend Spalvin made was Izumi Ryōnosuke, a fellow student of his and Futabatei's who later moved to Vladivostok and founded the newspaper there, Uradzio Nippō Vladivostok Daily Herald. The friendship between Izumi and Spalvin lasted until the end of the latter's life.

The intransigence of his superiors in Petersburg led Spalvin, as early as the autumn of 1899, to consider not returning to Petersburg but instead taking a post at the Oriental Institute, which had opened in Vladivostok that October. On 24 December 1899 Spalvin received a letter from its director, A. M. Pozdneyev, who suggested he submit an application and promised to help secure his appointment and pay for his passage from Japan. Pozdneyev also recommended that he order all the required literature and teaching materials in Japan and have them shipped directly to Vladivostok, where the Institute would pay for them through the Russo-Chinese Bank to the amount of 800 rubles. In a memorandum of 1925, Spalvin recalled that he had purchased Japanese literature for the Oriental Institute worth 2,500 rubles in total. Pozdneyev also asked Spalvin to order Japanese type for the printing shop and to find, on his own initiative, a native speaker to work with the students, and told him the salary he could expect. On 16 May 1900 Spalvin submitted a petition to be appointed acting professor of Japanese literature at the Oriental Institute. The Governor-General of the Amur region, Nikolai Grodekov, supported his petition to the Minister of National Education for Spalvin's appointment as professor from 1 July 1900. Saint Petersburg University raised no objection. Spalvin's assignment thus lasted a year and four months rather than two: classes were due to begin that autumn for second-year students. He brought with him his assistant Kiyotsugu Maeda, who knew German and English and was well versed in Japanese dialectology and literature. From 1 August 1900 Maeda was appointed lecturer with a salary of 800 rubles a year (about 200 yen) and a government apartment. On 23 August the Institute's Conference unanimously elected Spalvin and Maeda to the recommended posts. On 30 August Spalvin was also elected the Institute's librarian, a post he held until 1920.

Immediately after arriving in Vladivostok, Spalvin began publishing works of a mainly practical character — on the Japanese syllabary, on the basics of the language's structure, and examples of tales and anecdotes. On 21 October (3 November) 1900 he gave a speech, "Japanese Progress," at the ceremony marking the first anniversary of the Oriental Institute's founding. It plainly voiced his irritation at the widespread admiration for Japanese civilization at the time. Against the prevailing mood, Spalvin declared in his speech that Japanese culture was superficial and that its progress was merely an external shell of mindless imitation of European models. "For a long time afterward," Vasily Mendrin later wrote, "and even now, Professor Spalvin has been reproached for that speech. Enthusiasm for Japan was, and still is, too great for such a speech not to be met with indignation. And that enthusiasm went so far that people already anticipated learning from Japan — they said, and still say, that we have something to learn from Japan, and today they even send their children to receive their education at Japanese schools."

=== Professor at the Oriental Institute (1900–1917) ===
In Vladivostok, Spalvin had to plunge into the teaching process at the shortest possible notice: classes for second-year students began on 2 September 1900. (Note: The total income of an "acting professor" was 4,000 rubles a year: 2,000 in salary and 1,000 each for housing and board.) The teaching programme for the language and related courses was approved on 23 August. In the list of teaching materials he prepared 48 titles of literature and 17 Japanese newspapers and periodicals were listed. The Institute's Conference supported Spalvin's proposal to acquire for the library the complete holdings of the English, German, and French societies in Tokyo. Drawing on his own experience of learning Japanese, Spalvin sharply reduced the theoretical portion of his course in favour of more practical sessions. After only four or five lessons, students would begin reading conversational phrases arranged by grammatical principle, and by the third month they moved on to reading substantial texts in mixed kana-kanji script.

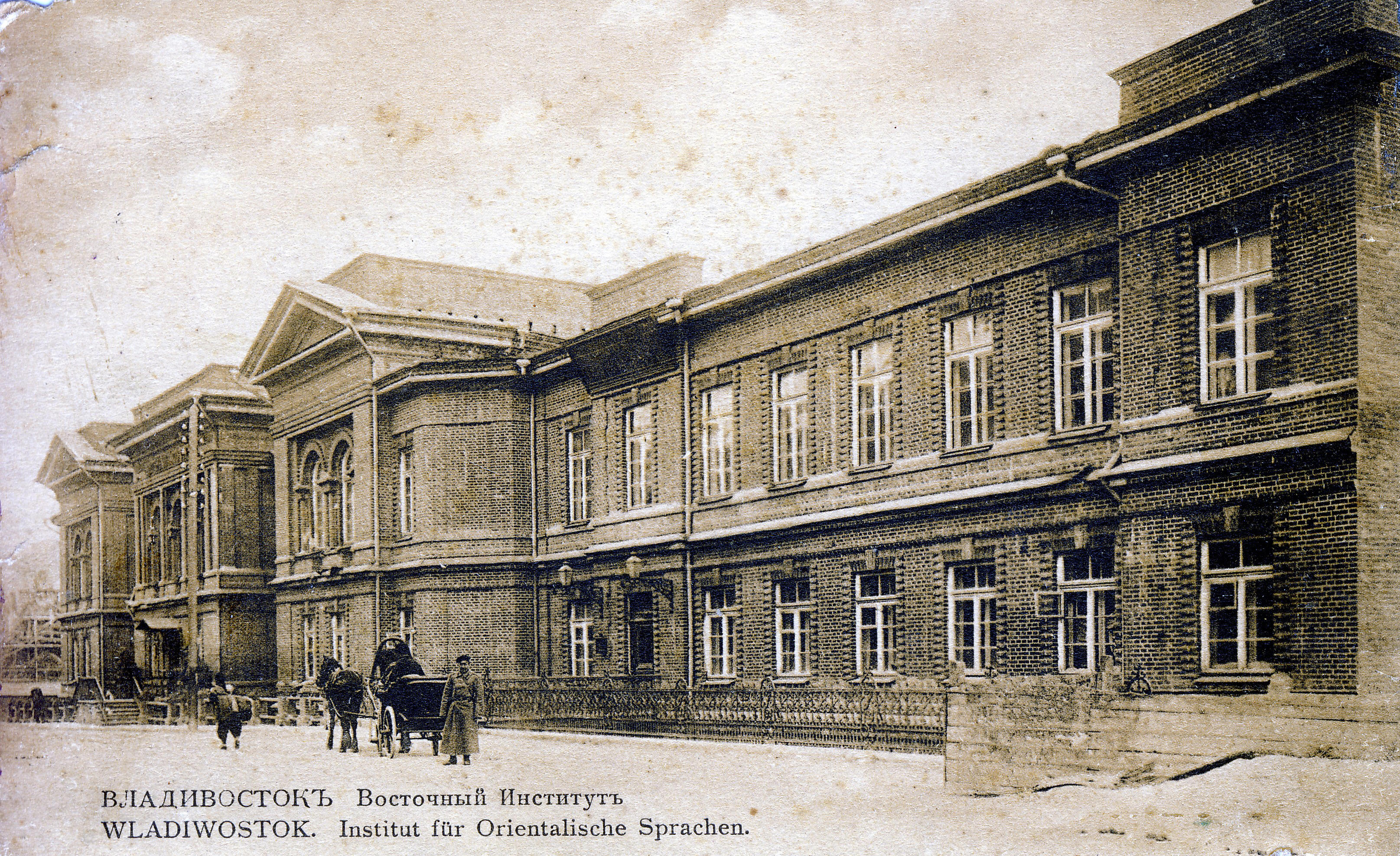
The Oriental Institute, Vladivostok.

In 1901, Spalvin produced his first substantial textbooks, including grammars and readers for junior and senior courses. The materials for practical exercises included samples of business documents as well as philosophical and literary texts, including works by Fukuzawa Yukichi, Tsubouchi Shōyō, and others. By 1911, the number of language classes had been increased to ten hours a week. In 1903 Spalvin's textbooks were also adopted by the Faculty of Oriental Studies in Saint Petersburg.

In 1901, the Oriental Institute's students were sent on placement to Japan for the first time. Almost immediately the Japanese authorities accused the Russian japanologists of espionage: in June 1902, an incident occurred in which P. G. Vaskevich was detained. Nonetheless, his report on his journey from Tsuruga to Niigata was awarded a gold medal. Spalvin greatly hoped to keep Vaskevich at the Institute, but he was drawn to practical work instead. For his part, Spalvin had, as early as 1901, approached the Japanese government on the Institute's behalf with a proposal to exchange scholarly literature, and received responses from 15 Japanese institutions and libraries. However, it never proved possible to organize regular publication by the Vladivostok orientalists in Japanese periodicals. From November 1902 Spalvin served as an official of the internal foreign censorship department; even earlier, he had worked on translating the coded messages of Japanese spies caught near the Slavyanka tract.

In April–August 1903, Spalvin was again sent to Japan. This time he visited Kyoto and Tokyo.

In 1904, by order No. 56 of 3 April from the head of the Amur region administration, Spalvin was appointed acting director of the Institute and served in that post from 15 April to 5 December 1904, that is, until the arrival in Vladivostok of the new director, Dmitry Pozdneev, with whom he had a sharp conflict. During the war the Institute was evacuated to Verkhneudinsk, which brought on a crisis: 59 of the Institute's 61 students were expelled (for various reasons, including military service), and the directorate lost contact with the teaching staff, since Russia's educational institutions were closed amid the military and revolutionary events of February 1904.

During the scholar's third trip to Japan (June–October 1906), the newspaper Osaka Asahi ran a six-part exposé, A Spy's Diary (25 September – 8 October), openly claiming that Kiyotsugu Maeda was a Russian spy and Spalvin his handler. Spalvin later gave the following account of why A Spy's Diary stopped after its sixth instalment:

The rector of Kyoto Imperial University at the time, Professor Hiroji Kinoshita, was a true friend and a brave man. After the war there were many people who felt ill will toward Russia, and stones were often thrown at me — one of the major Osaka newspapers even ran an article about me under the headline A Spy's Diary. One day Mr. Kinoshita invited me to see him through his secretary, and we talked the whole evening. I never actually asked him to have the articles retracted. And yet the articles about me stopped appearing. Only after I had returned to Vladivostok did word come from the university secretary of Mr. Kinoshita's death. The letter also set out the detailed circumstances of the affair. It turned out that Mr. Kinoshita had sent a letter to the director of the newspaper defending me, in which, among other things, he said that if the articles about me did not stop, he would sever all relations with the director. That is the impression Mr. Kinoshita left with me — a man who, in that difficult time, was able to show such generosity and courage.

Shimizu Masatarō, secretary of the Law Faculty of Kyoto Imperial University, helped the scholar's family move into the Gion district, into the former house of Professor Nitobe Inazō, who had been transferred to Tokyo. Professor Nitobe's book on bushido had been partially translated into Russian and published by Spalvin in the Bulletin of the Oriental Institute as early as 1902.

On 14 August 1907, Kiyotsugu Maeda, who had briefly returned home, was murdered in Shiba Park in Tokyo by a man named Imamura Katsugorō. The press accused Maeda of treason and branded him a collaborator and traitor to his country. For Spalvin, who arrived in Japan a little later, the murder of his longtime assistant was a heavy blow. In his comments to the press he demanded that Maeda's name be cleared of slander, firmly rejected the accusations of espionage, and insisted that the purpose of his own trip to Japan was to acquire printing type. The type brought back from Japan made it possible, from 1907, for the Oriental Institute's publications to typeset complex combinations of Russian and Oriental scripts in seven languages. From Kyoto secondhand booksellers the scholar acquired eighteenth- and early nineteenth-century manuscripts — Oroshiyakoku Suimudan (Dreams of Russia), Bandan (Discussions of Barbarians), and Kankai Ibun (Curious Accounts of the Surrounding Seas). After the Oriental Institute was closed, these books were transferred to the Lenin State Library (Russian State Library) in Moscow. In 1909 Spalvin made a fourth trip to Japan to complete his work on phonetics and dialectology, primarily to prepare textbooks for publication.

In the 1910s, Spalvin's exacting standards, applied to himself and his colleagues alike, led to a cooling of relations within the teaching staff. Earlier he had entered into a sharp polemic over translation with Dmitry Pozdneev. He was also unhappy with the treatment he received from the director, A. V. Rudakov, claiming that Rudakov was holding back his promotions. In fact it was the Institute's director who had pressed for the scholar to be awarded the Order of St. Vladimir, 4th class, with a reduction of the normal period of service required. In the justification for the award, Spalvin was described as a highly qualified specialist in library work, an "impeccable editor," and a "capable head of the typolithography shop." In October 1916, Spalvin was confirmed in the rank of Collegiate Counsellor, with seniority from 1 July 1900. This, however, did nothing to ease the strained relations.

Over the course of his teaching career, Spalvin was also awarded the Order of St. Anna, 3rd and 2nd class, the Order of St. Stanislaus, 3rd and 2nd class, and the medal commemorating the 300th anniversary of the reign of the House of Romanov.

=== The revolutionary years (1917–1919) ===
Since the 1900s, Spalvin had adhered to the ideology of the Constitutional Democratic Party (Kadets); he greeted the February Revolution of 1917 as the beginning of a new era in Russian history. The teaching staff of the Oriental Institute hoped for new academic freedoms. Spalvin took part in the April elections to the City Duma and proved to be the only representative of the Oriental Institute elected on the Party of People's Freedom list. That same year, local party members founded the Free Russia publishing partnership in the city and, in June, acquired a printing works. Spalvin served as chairman of its board and managing director until the publishing house closed in 1923. Besides its newspaper and political literature, the publishing house issued textbooks and the works of K. K. Kurteyev, N. V. Küner, N. P. Matsokin, and V. V. Engelfeld, and produced a second edition of the novel Dersu Uzala. The newspaper Golos Primorya, also founded with Spalvin's involvement in the summer of 1917, took a sharply critical stance toward Kolchak's administration; in 1919 it was shut down twice and re-emerged under other names before reverting to its original one. Its founder was accused of Bolshevism, since Spalvin consistently pursued the line of reuniting the former territories of the Russian Empire and published material on Soviet power. In 1920 Spalvin personally took responsibility for the content of cartoons mocking the Semyonovites and the Japanese occupiers. The newspaper survived under Bolshevik rule for almost a year before being closed, like all "bourgeois" publications, on 12 October 1923.

Spalvin's initial reaction to the Bolshevik coup was sharply negative, and after the dissolution of the Constituent Assembly he signed a protest submitted on behalf of the Union of Employees of Government Institutions of Vladivostok on 29 January 1918. In the spring of 1918, working as an observer for the military censorship committee, he dealt with the Vladivostok Soviet of Workers' and Peasants' Deputies, an experience that significantly changed his attitude toward the Bolsheviks. Still, the central project of the scholar's life became the transformation of the Oriental Institute into the Far Eastern State University while preserving the priority of Oriental studies within its structure. Already in 1919, in correspondence with the Omsk government, the professor set out special conditions for the future Faculty of Oriental Studies, including preservation of all the teaching staff's rights and the retention of its own library, museum, and printing works. The Council of the Oriental Institute set up a commission on the conversion into a university in October 1919, which Spalvin joined. On 13 February 1920, the Institute issued a resolution on the need to establish a university while preserving all the autonomous rights of the Higher School of Scholarly and Practical Oriental Studies, as the new internal structure was to be called. In fact, Spalvin had first aired a number of the ideas he voiced in these revolutionary years back in 1906, in an attempt to change the Oriental Institute's curriculum.

The Maritime Zemstvo Administration authorized the conversion of the Oriental Institute into the Faculty of Oriental Studies of the Far Eastern State University on 17 April 1920. The new structures were created using the Oriental Institute's own resources, which led to a sharp deterioration of relations within the staff and to sabotage of directives from higher bodies. By then appointed dean of the Faculty of Oriental Studies, Spalvin submitted a statement on 20 January 1921 declaring that he could not attend the university council owing to the "openly hostile attitude" of the leadership toward him personally and toward the faculty he headed. He was likewise sharply critical of those who had received readerships, describing them as people who had "shown nothing" in their teaching or research work, and argued that any genuinely talented instructors ought to flee such an environment.

=== Soviet Russia — from rector to diplomat (1920–1924) ===
On 1 November 1920, the scholar's wife, with whom he had lived for 19 years, died. Despite this personal tragedy, Spalvin had to work intensively on revising the university's staffing arrangements and drawing up new curricula and syllabi, not least because of the radical shift in the political situation across the whole East Asian region. His "Memorandum" to the rector, Grigory Podstavin, dated 11 February 1921, proposed creating cross-departmental structures — sections of Korean and Mongolian studies — and adding to the curriculum the history of religions, cultural studies, comparative Far Eastern linguistics, comparative study of Chinese characters, and the history of trade and the "economic life" of East Asia. He also developed a complex introductory course on the study of the countries of the Far East and proposed requiring senior students to carry out research and write papers and surveys in Oriental languages. On 28 March 1922 Spalvin submitted to the board of the Faculty of Oriental Studies a proposal for his own posting to Tokyo to study the current situation in a country he had not visited in 13 years. On 11 April, he received credentials as head of a delegation of instructors sent by the Provisional Priamur Government for the period 9 April – 20 August 1922. His duties (as dean, member of the library commission, editor of the Bulletin of the Faculty of Oriental Studies, and chairman of the publishing commission) were temporarily transferred to N. V. Küner. His actual return took place on 20 September. Because of the openly terroristic regime of General Mikhail Diterikhs, the rector, Grigory Podstavin, issued an order announcing his own "temporary departure" from Vladivostok (with no stated date or destination) and placing the rector's authority in Spalvin's hands. On 25 October, the Bolsheviks entered the city and ordered everyone to report to work from the 26th, on pain of dismissal for sabotage. As acting rector, the japanologist set about restoring the institution, in his own words "subordinating the university to Soviet power." In the second half of January 1923 he handed over authority to V. I. Ogorodnikov, newly appointed rector. Spalvin remained dean until 22 March, after which he was replaced by Alexander Grebenshchikov as a more compliant and cooperative administrator. (Note: Spalvin subsequently obstructed Grebenshchikov's transfer to the People's Commissariat for Foreign Affairs and rejected his proposal to create a separate Society for Cultural Ties in Vladivostok.)

The professor's standing remained high. On 25 February 1923, an organizing bureau of the Far Eastern branch of the All-Russian Scientific Association of Oriental Studies was established, with Spalvin elected as its head and Roman Kim as secretary. Spalvin also worked for the newspaper Krasnoye Znamya and founded the journal Novy Dalny Vostok, which was exempted from prior censorship. In April 1924 Spalvin was elected chairman of the provincial branch of the Society for Aid to Victims of the Intervention, while continuing an extensive lecturing schedule. According to the historian Wakio Fujimoto, Spalvin's subsequent career was shaped by the establishment in Moscow of the Committee for the Study of Japan. Its chairman was S. I. Dukhovsky (of the Far Eastern department of the People's Commissariat for Foreign Affairs), its secretary Roman Kim, and among the japanologists included were Nikolai Konrad, Spalvin, and N. V. Küner, along with Oleg Pletner, who had been expelled from Japan and represented the Red Army intelligence directorate on the Committee. In the autumn of 1924 Spalvin became de facto head of the journal Vostochnaya Studiya, intended for young scholars and students of the Far Eastern University. In the combined January–February 1925 issue of the journal, Spalvin published an article, The Plenipotentiary Mission of the USSR on Japanese Territory, whose content shows his familiarity with the workings of that institution. It was probably to Pletner — whom Spalvin, in his time as dean, had tried to bring onto the Far Eastern University's Faculty of Oriental Studies — that he owed his appointment as dragoman of the plenipotentiary mission; their correspondence from 1921–1922 survives. When the People's Commissariat for Foreign Affairs established the All-Union Society for Cultural Relations with Foreign Countries on 8 August 1925, Spalvin, already sent to Japan as translator and secretary of the mission, was appointed its representative there.

=== In Japan (1925–1931) ===
After the conclusion of the Convention on the Basic Principles of Relations between the USSR and Japan, the 53-year-old Spalvin, who had never before undertaken diplomatic work, was appointed secretary and translator to the Soviet plenipotentiary mission in Tokyo. On 15 April 1925 he set out for Harbin, where he met the new plenipotentiary, Viktor Kopp. From there he travelled by train to Busan, by ferry to Shimonoseki, and by train on to Tokyo.

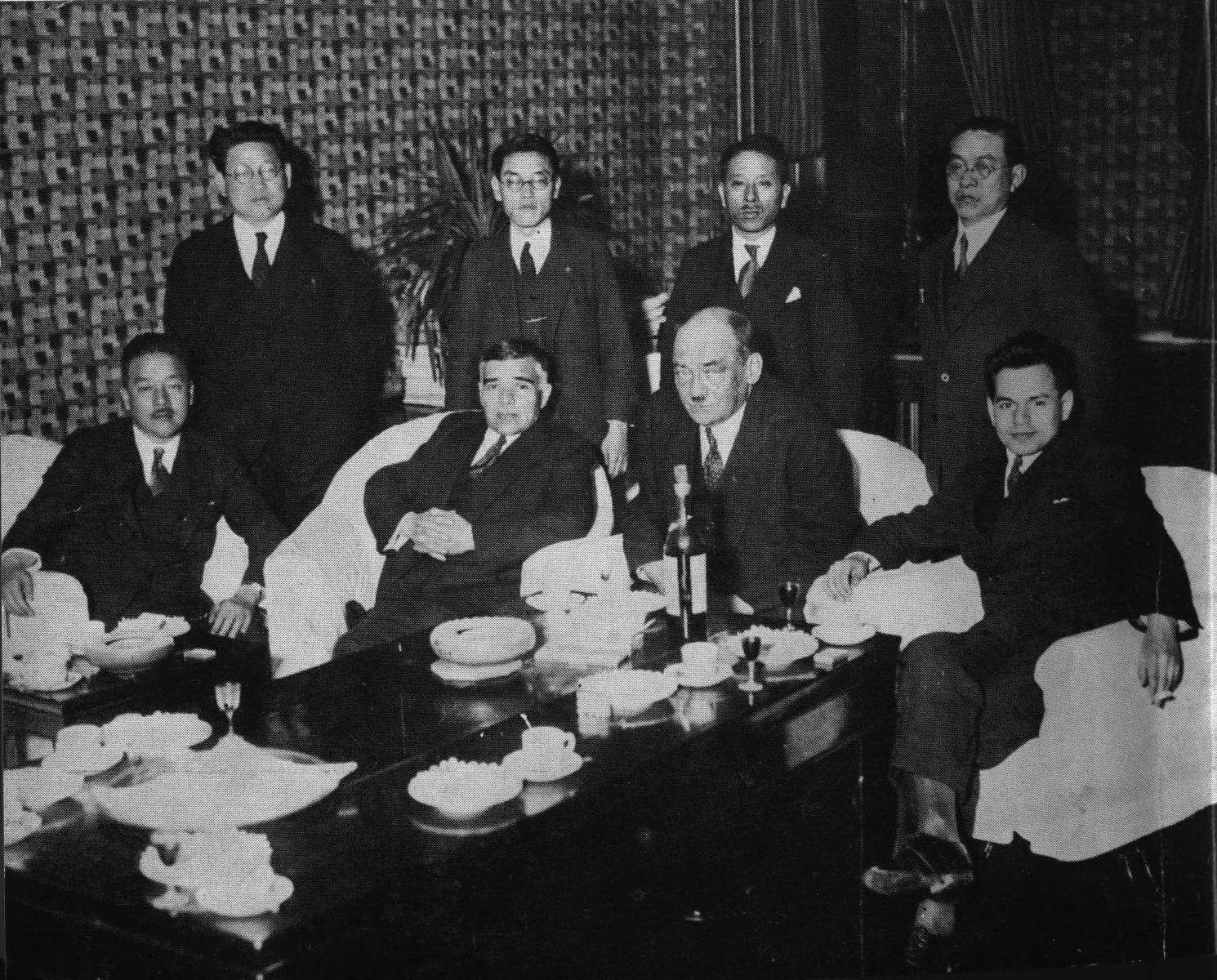
Plenipotentiary Troyanovsky (second from left, front row) and translator Spalvin (third from left, front row), 1931

In Tokyo, the professor and his wife (since 1922 he had been married to Kaoru Maeda, widow of his longtime assistant) lived in the embassy building. As not only secretary-translator at the embassy but also a member of the VOKS, the workers' and peasants' union organization for cultural ties abroad, he was drawn into propaganda work that was closely monitored by the Japanese police. For instance, during a public lecture on Russia organized by the Japan-Russia Literary and Artistic Society and held at the Tokyo YMCA on 8 October 1925, Spalvin announced that he intended to speak about the education system in Russia. The police cut the lecture short. The pretext for accusations of propaganda was his remark that communism was the ideology of contemporary Russia. The Soviet plenipotentiary lodged a protest with Japan's Ministry of Foreign Affairs, stating that "the address in no way touched on Japan's internal politics and was purely an objective statement of fact."

In 1925, there were plans to hold an introductory exhibition on the Soviet Union at the embassy, and Spalvin was placed in charge of organizing it. It finally took place from 23 to 26 August 1926. According to surveillance data from the Metropolitan Police Board, 1,036 people visited the exhibition over the three days, with Spalvin seeing off visitors and providing commentary. In 1927 Spalvin, through VOKS, organized an exhibition of the newest Russian art, comprising 403 works in oil, watercolour, and graphic media. On 8 June 1928 he signed, on behalf of the Soviet Union, the contract for a Moscow tour by Ichikawa Sadanji's Kabuki troupe.

At the embassy Spalvin founded a Circle of japanologists, made up of young diplomats who were former graduates of the Far Eastern State University. One of its members was the university graduate Andrei Leifert, who later illustrated one of Spalvin's books. From 1928 the papers presented to the circle were printed by the embassy in special Russian-language editions. On 27 October 1930, Tokyo marked, with a formal celebration, the 35th anniversary of Spalvin's career in Oriental studies; 111 people attended the banquet, including the new plenipotentiary, Alexander Troyanovsky. On 1 November 1930, Vladivostok marked, in absentia, the thirtieth anniversary of Spalvin's scholarly career, and a number of pieces about him appeared in the newspaper Krasnoye Znamya.

According to Wakio Fujimoto, the chief reason for Spalvin's transfer from Japan to China was a conflict with the leadership of VOKS. The organization's chairwoman, Olga Kameneva, had already informed Plenipotentiary Troyanovsky in February 1928 that she had entirely lost touch with Spalvin and had received no proposals for work from him: "his silence is sufficient proof of his negligence." In September 1928 the plenipotentiary defended Spalvin vigorously, reporting that he might move to another post that same year, and that the only possible replacement would be Nikolai Konrad, who had no intention of leaving Leningrad. "…Most of the people of interest to VOKS speak only Japanese, and a great many of the facts, data, and references VOKS needs for its work can likewise only be obtained in Japanese. Finally, specialized information on Japanese culture, science, art, and so on is needed. …You, for instance, continue to think poorly of Spalvin's work, but I believe that without Spalvin things will go badly under Japanese conditions." The invitation to work for the Chinese Eastern Railway was arranged through Troyanovsky's efforts, but although it had already been received in the summer of 1930, his actual departure was delayed by more than a year. Spalvin's farewell from Japan the following year was described in the newspaper Yomiuri Shimbun of 23 October 1931, and he left Tokyo on 9 November.

=== China (1931–1932) ===
In the summer of 1930, Plenipotentiary Alexander Troyanovsky received a request from the board of the Chinese Eastern Railway for Spalvin to be transferred to China. According to A. Posadskov, the proposal to transfer the japanologist was linked to the active Japanese military and political encroachment into the region. The railway's board guaranteed him an apartment and covered the cost of relocating and transporting the scholar's library and collections. However, negotiations dragged on, and it was only on 7 October 1931 that Spalvin and his wife were posted to the Chinese Eastern Railway's service — almost simultaneously with the Japanese invasion of Manchuria. The scholar's actual relocation was delayed: after leaving Japan in November 1931, he visited Vladivostok, where he met his longtime acquaintance Berta Buscher-Tarulis, to whom he gave the furniture and household items that remained there, and collected the portion of his library still in his homeland to transport it to Harbin.

The Spalvins with their belongings were settled in apartment No. 6 at 26 Girinskaya Street, which held several thousand volumes of books and various collections. The Chinese Eastern Railway board even reduced the scholar's rent because of the great value of the materials he had brought, with the understanding that the books would pass into the organization's ownership. By order of the railway's managing director, Yu. V. Rudy, Spalvin was enrolled as senior agent of the commercial department pending a suitable vacancy, with a salary of 4,620 rubles a year plus relocation allowance and other benefits. He found the position tedious.

=== Manchukuo (1932–1933) ===
On 27 April 1932, he was transferred to the post of senior agent to the deputy chairman of the board, with a salary of 5,040 rubles a year, which allowed him to subscribe to the Japanese press, acquire new publications, and "maintain at least a minimal level of specialized expertise." One account holds that Spalvin's work was mainly intelligence-analytical in nature, connected with the general situation on the Soviet border; it is known that in March 1933 he was sent on assignment to Xinjiang.

Spalvin immediately threw himself into scholarly work. In 1932 the director of the Chinese Eastern Railway's Central Library, Nikolai Ustryalov, published two Bibliographic Collections; the second contained Spalvin's 74-page survey of Japanese literature and journalism on the occupation of Manchuria. He also worked on other projects — Ippolit Baranov recalled a lecture Spalvin gave on the Japanese writing system. In the summer of 1933 the scholar received an invitation to work at the Harbin Faculty of Law. He and his wife prepared a textbook of spoken Japanese and a course on the modern history of Japan, for which he managed to deliver the introductory lecture before his death.

What is known of the scholar's final days comes from his wife's recollections and from local press reports. He was hospitalized for emergency surgery (a "twisting of the small intestine"; the illness lasted three days in total, beginning on 8 November). The operation was successful, but around nine o'clock in the evening of 10 November his heart failed. Spalvin was buried in the so-called New (Dormition) Cemetery, which was closed in 1958 and later destroyed. Obituaries also appeared in the Japanese press, where he was compared to Lafcadio Hearn.

== Family ==
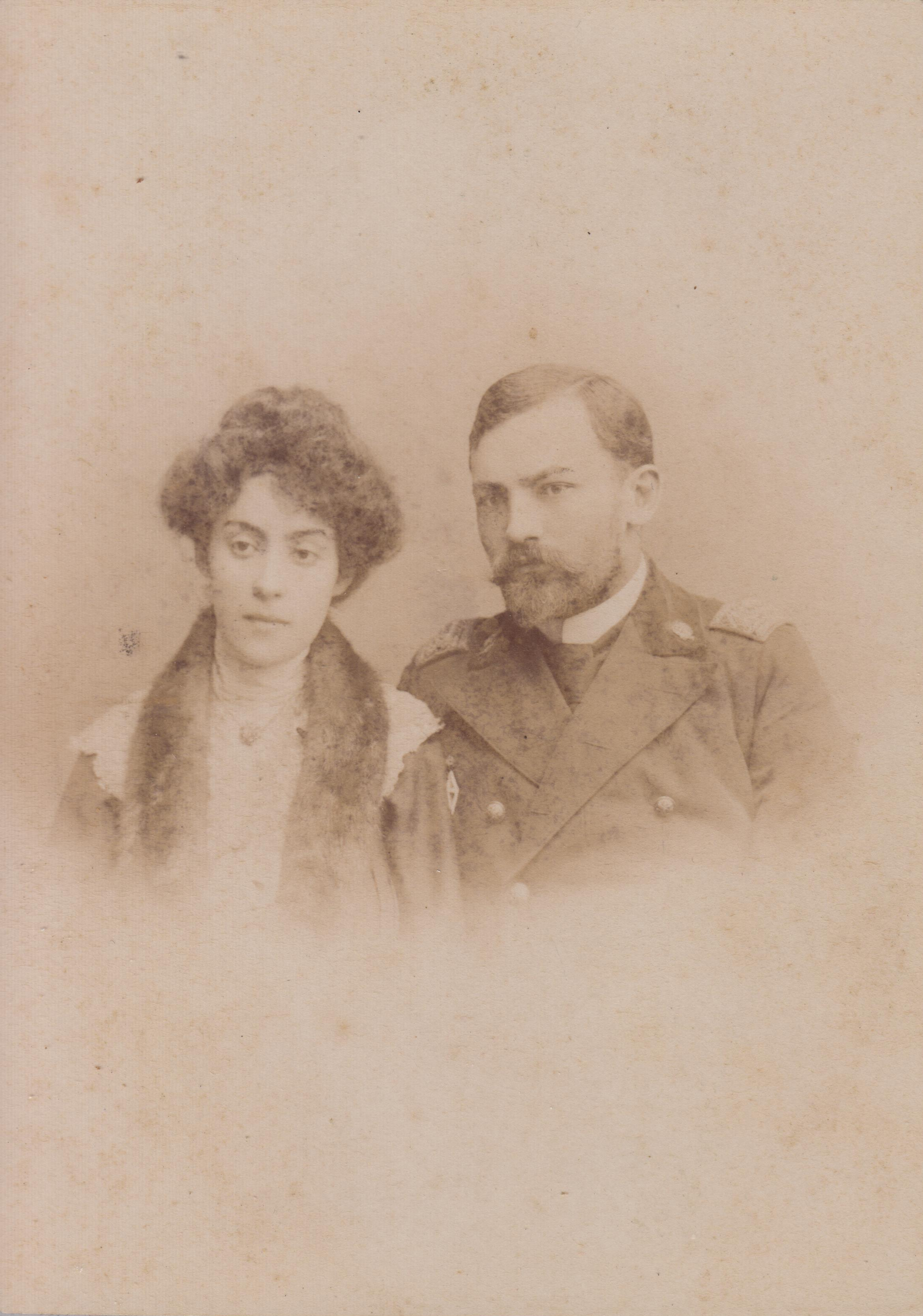
Spalvin with his first wife, Vera Segal.

According to family tradition, Yevgeny was accompanied on his first trip to Japan by Berta Maria Buscher, a native of Riga and the daughter of a tailor, who appears to have been a relative of the Spalviņš family. She managed the scholar's household for many years. Having arrived in Vladivostok unmarried, the 29-year-old Spalvin married Vera Ivanovna Segal, daughter of a hereditary honorary citizen of Vladivostok, on 27 July 1901; the ceremony was performed by Father Konstantin Tsivilev, an auditing student at the Oriental Institute. The couple had four children: a daughter, Valentina (born 1902), a daughter, Yevgenia (1904), a daughter, Irina (1906), and a son, Vyacheslav (born 1908). The ever-present Berta Buscher served as housekeeper and governess. Their daughter Irina was born during a posting to Japan; her name, meaning "peace" in Greek, was chosen symbolically, alluding to good relations between Russia and Japan. Since Spalvin had to return to his work at the Institute, Vera Ivanovna and the newborn were left in Japan for over a year in Berta Buscher's care; Irina Spalvina even attended a Japanese kindergarten as a result. In 1909 Berta married K. I. Tarulis, a staff member of the Oriental Institute's library.

Vera Ivanovna died on 1 November 1920, after nineteen years of marriage. Because of her funeral, the council of the Far Eastern State University cancelled the celebration of the 21st anniversary of the Oriental Institute's founding, which had been due to take place on 3 November; on that day Vera Spalvina was buried at Pokrovsky Cemetery in Vladivostok. Two years later, eleven days before his own 50th birthday, on 29 September 1922, Spalvin married Kaoru, the Japanese widow of his longtime assistant Maeda, who took the baptismal name Yelizaveta Aleksandrovna. Archpriest Konoplyov performed the ceremony at the university church. The marriage documents stated that Ye. A. Maeda was "a native of Verkhneudinsk in Transbaikal Province, Orthodox, born in 1880, and had worked for many years at the library of the Oriental Institute."

== Personality ==
Although Spalvin described himself as a gentle person, he also admitted that he always could fight back. He was sharp in his judgments, blunt, and quick-tempered, and was occasionally unfairly harsh with those close to him. Exactingness and a propensity for conflict were defining traits of the scholar's character throughout his life. Even in his later years, while in Japan, Spalvin fell out badly with Boris Pilnyak and was unable to get along with the art historian Nikolai Punin, who complained about him to VOKS during the organization of an exhibition of Soviet painting that toured Japanese cities from May to July 1927. Spalvin's supervisors at VOKS wrote to him that visitors from Japan, both foreign and Russian, had been complaining about his high-handed and unfriendly manner, adding that information they had since received bore out these long-standing rumours rather than dismissing them as isolated or unfair, as they had previously assumed.

At the same time, contemporaries noted the scholar's considerable organizational abilities, inseparable from his natural fastidiousness and his attention to detail, including in financial matters. Nicholas of Japan, who met Spalvin in 1899, described his new acquaintance in his diary: he had called on Spalvin and found him busy for the whole day going over accounts, settling up with a cook who had tried to cheat him just as he had cheated the previous (German) tenant of the flat — without success, since despite receiving three thousand rubles from the university, Spalvin evidently liked to keep a close eye on his money, which the archbishop considered commendable, adding that all Russians would do well to be more like him: not Russian by blood, but Russian in how carefully he handled the money he was paid.

His exactingness and demands on those around him did not, however, translate into aloofness or reserve. Mikhail Sladkovsky recalled an image of Spalvin at an evening event marking the 25th anniversary of the Oriental Institute's founding: Spalvin was, in Sladkovsky's account, a particular picture of high spirits and gaiety that evening — sweeping up his young Japanese wife, whose elaborately styled hair barely reached his shoulder, and whirling with her into the middle of the dancing crowd of young people, dancing the most fashionable foxtrots, waltzes, and tangos.

== Teaching and researching ==
=== Teaching the Japanese language ===
The academician Vladimir Alpatov noted that the intellectual environment and style of teaching at the Vladivostok Oriental Institute differed greatly from that of the capital, Petersburg. The Oriental Institute trained practical workers who needed to speak the language well and understand the realities of the country they studied; theoretical training took a back seat, and its textbooks and publications were likewise practically oriented. By the unanimous testimony of his contemporaries, Spalvin himself had a brilliant command of Japanese and was deeply immersed in Japanese culture, though he maintained that the language interested him not for its own sake but only as a tool for understanding the culture. Even so, at the time of his arrival in Vladivostok there were no Japanese-language textbooks or teaching materials in Russia at all, and until 1910 he alone compiled the courses and wrote the textbooks. Under these conditions Spalvin drew heavily on foreign scholarship, incorporating translated sections wholesale — always noting when he did so — while thoroughly reworking the borrowed material and adapting it to the structure of the Russian language and the needs of Russian higher education. His textbooks covered both spoken and written forms of the language, including the "elevated" classical written language. Among the courses he taught was Japanese grammar, though only two of his lectures on it were ever reproduced, by hectograph. Unlike his contemporaries in Japanese studies, Spalvin drew on Japanese as well as Western scholarship. In the lecture where he described the conjugation system of the classical written language, he attempted to revise the schemes accepted in Japanese linguistics of the day. He worked mainly from the ideas of Basil Hall Chamberlain, refining points of linguistic fact where necessary; in criticizing traditional Japanese grammatical scholarship he refined it without rejecting it outright. Like Chamberlain, he denied that Japanese possessed a true passive voice, arguing instead that the relevant forms carried "potential" and "receptive" meanings — an interpretation no one else adopted. Spalvin also had to provide a brief outline of Japanese syntax, probably the first in Russian Japanology; as Alpatov characterizes it, this too blended traditional Japanese and classical European linguistic approaches.

Drawing on his own experience, as well as on the practical needs of applied Oriental studies, Spalvin consistently argued, in preparing textbooks and designing courses, for expanding practical spoken-language work. Japanese, in the wake of the Meiji reforms, was in a state of transformation and far from codified or literarily refined. Official communication was conducted in the literary language, bungo, while the new fiction increasingly used the colloquial language then gradually taking shape as education reform proceeded; a traditional literature also existed in kanbun, effectively a written dialect of Chinese. All these registers formed an organic whole within national communication, complicated further by the coexistence of kanji and kana scripts and by the absence of standardized spelling or pronunciation norms.

The Institute's director, A. M. Pozdneyev, noted in a report on Spalvin's work that in the 1901 academic year the teaching of Japanese underwent a general overhaul: the professor folded the entire theoretical grammar course into practical study. Learning kana and memorizing the key postpositions, verb forms, and common auxiliary verbs took no more than four or five hours, while spoken-language practice occupied seven daytime lessons and three evening ones (an hour each); grammar instruction took three hours, later reduced to one. Students were required to memorize ten new kanji characters a day, with one hour a week set aside for dictation.

Spalvin's principal textbooks were produced under time pressure and were of extremely poor print quality, since they were reproduced from typescripts or lithographed from handwritten notes — though this did nothing to diminish their pedagogical value. His fundamental Japanese Reader, in its final form, comprised twenty sections drawn from genuine letters, telegrams, receipts, contracts, public lectures, political speeches, international treaties, and even transcripts of prisoner-of-war interrogations. Spalvin also published a Collection of Excerpts of Literary-Style Japanese Prose, a Collection of Excerpts of Japanese Belles-Lettres, and a Collection of Everyday Japanese Business Papers. In 1909, for advanced courses, he published a manual titled The Japanese Army, and in 1913 a Collection of Talks and Discussions by Contemporary Japanese Figures. His Reader of Colloquial Japanese, first published in 1903, was written entirely in the Japanese syllabaries — katakana and hiragana — used alternately (odd-numbered pieces in katakana, even-numbered ones in hiragana). In 1907 the reader was typeset and published in the Bulletin of the Oriental Institute in mixed kana-kanji form. Its material was designed to cover the widest possible range of real communicative situations — several hundred of them — reflecting speakers of very different social status and level of speech culture, so that students could engage with and understand the speech patterns of every layer of society, from professors and former samurai to prostitutes and vagrants. Larger still were his Practical Japanese Conversations, comprising 1,668 texts grouped into 57 sections. This manual was based on the Japanese-language textbooks of Ernest Satow and Rudolf Lange, though all the language examples were carefully edited, partly rewritten, and in part specially composed by the lecturers Kiyotsugu Maeda and Mamoru Matsuda. Every text was given in two forms: on even pages in mixed kana-kanji script, on odd pages in kana alone. Instruction proceeded from the simplest forms of spoken language toward complex written forms, aiming at the ability to read Japanese texts of any difficulty in any combination of scripts.

Between 1913 and 1933, Spalvin published no further work on the Japanese language. Already settled in Harbin, he and his wife Kaoru Maeda prepared what became his best-known textbook of spoken Japanese, published in three parts after his death. It was based on the practical Japanese grammar Colloquial Japanese by William Montgomery McGovern, published in 1920. From the original, Spalvin's textbook took over the structure of "concentric" presentation, in which the same material is given twice, first briefly and then in expanded form. The volume of grammar was more than doubled through expanded teaching material and vocabulary; in the grammar course proper, McGovern's original text was retained wherever it matched Spalvin's own views. The section on voice, however, was rewritten entirely, as was the section contrasting the markers wa (は) and ga (が), which anticipated research by Soviet grammarians of the postwar period; in his treatment of plurality markers, Spalvin likewise anticipated similar observations later made by Alexander Kholodovich. Entirely original was the third "concentric" section, describing the history and contemporary state of the Japanese writing system and setting out a method for teaching its various forms based on the graphic elements common to kanji and kana; this system had already been described in 1931 in Spalvin's book Japan: A View from Outside. Equally original were the sections on the contemporary Japanese linguistic situation as Spalvin saw it — he treated the classical written language and the modern literary language as wholly distinct, whereas McGovern had called them merely different styles — and on the Romanization of Japanese script.

Reviewing Spalvin's textbooks, Alpatov observed that by the 1930s Spalvin's theoretical views had already fallen behind the Japanology of his time. He entirely ignored, for instance, the work of Yevgeny Polivanov and Oleg Pletner, whose joint Japanese grammar was published in 1930. The section on Japanese pitch accent in the 1933 textbook was written by Spalvin entirely on his own; his vast practical experience with the language let him notice that Japanese accentuation differed from Russian, but he never managed to systematize it to the level Polivanov had achieved. Because of their difficult personal relations, Spalvin never once cited Polivanov's work in his own. In the preface to his collected articles For Marxist Linguistics, Polivanov devoted a rather sharp paragraph to Spalvin, remarking that objections of the kind raised against him often stemmed simply from critics knowing one of his works but not others that would have answered them fully, and citing Spalvin's own published protest — in a Japanese journal, against Polivanov's transliteration of the syllable chi — as a case in point, dismissing it by pointing to a passage in his own 1928 Introduction to Linguistics concerning Japanese perception of that syllable as pronounced by Latvian speakers.

In the end, Spalvin's work had no significant influence on the development of Japanology as a discipline. Nor did the Cyrillic transcription of Japanese phonetics that he devised, based on an adapted Hepburn system, take hold in the field more broadly, although it proved convenient and was used consistently in the Oriental Institute's Vladivostok publications, and partly persisted in the press and popular publications (for example, in rendering the sound "yo," as in "Yokohama" or "Yoko"). The Polivanov system, published in 1930 but devised considerably earlier, differed from Spalvin's mainly in its principles for representing paired consonants. Polivanov's system was subsequently popularized by Nikolai Konrad in the Great Japanese–Russian Dictionary and was never revised again, despite criticism.

=== Japanese linguistics and Dmitry Pozdneev ===
Dmitry Pozdneev and Spalvin graduated from the Faculty of Oriental Studies five years apart (Pozdneev being the elder) and probably first met while Spalvin was still a student, at the dacha of the noted orientalist Konstantin Golstunsky, whose daughter later became Pozdneev's wife. According to their correspondence, relations remained businesslike and cordial until 1904, with news passed between them through the Oriental Institute's director and Spalvin's first employer, A. M. Pozdneyev, Dmitry's brother. The decisive break came in 1905, when Dmitry Pozdneev — despite having no experience in higher education and no professorial rank, in violation of the Oriental Institute's own charter — was appointed its director. The new head immediately announced sweeping changes, declaring bluntly that he would run the Institute as he saw fit or not run it at all. The poorly prepared 1905 evacuation of staff and students to Verkhneudinsk was likewise his initiative, and conflict became unavoidable. As early as December 1904, Pozdneev had written to his wife that the hardest cases would be Rudakov and Spalvin, who he felt had grown far too powerful under his brother's direction; by January 1905 he was complaining that Spalvin was demoralizing all the students. Their March 1905 correspondence makes clear that the former bank official, with no background in the field, failed altogether to appreciate what Spalvin had achieved in organizing the Japanese department's teaching, focusing only on what he saw as administrative and financial neglect at the Institute. Spalvin himself, for his part, freely admitted that administrative work had always been "hard work" for him. In private letters, Pozdneev accused Spalvin of being unprincipled, suspicious, vindictive, and disorderly — calling him, in effect, a thoroughly poisonous character.

The immediate spark for the conflict's escalation was a case filed on 12 March 1905 with the Governor-General of the Amur region. Because of his sudden move to Vladivostok in 1900, Spalvin had not completed his Ministry of National Education–funded posting to Japan; since that move had been mandated by order of Governor-General Nikolai Grodekov, he had spent the 600-ruble stipend transferred to him by the Russo-Chinese Bank. Director Pozdneev held that this sum should be repaid from the governorship's budget rather than the Institute's. Spalvin's own position was complicated by the fact that his transfer to Vladivostok had never been properly documented, so the Ministry never paid him the travel and relocation allowances due for interrupting his posting and taking up his new position at the Oriental Institute; according to records preserved in the Russian State Historical Archive, the sum owed came to nearly 1,800 rubles. Pozdneev reported to the Governor-General that the professor, wishing simply to see the protracted matter closed, was not pressing for any compensation for his move to Vladivostok beyond repayment of the 600-ruble stipend to the bank — a report that only deepened the hostility between them. The question of compensating Spalvin remained unresolved as late as 1909.

In November 1905, Pozdneev left for Japan, remaining nominally director of the Institute until 1 September 1906, though he had actually held the post for only 8 of those 27 months and taught no courses at all. The two men had no further direct contact, although Pozdneev's ill will toward Spalvin sometimes made itself felt in Petersburg whenever funding for Japanological publishing projects was discussed. Pozdneev himself returned to Russia in 1910 to work at the Practical Oriental Academy of the Imperial Society of Orientalists.

After stepping down as director of the Oriental Institute, Pozdneev settled in Tokyo, where between 1906 and 1910 he produced a series of Japanese-language textbooks for a Russian readership. His reader was based on the primer Japanese History for Elementary Schools (『小學日本歴史』), published by Japan's Ministry of Education in 1903 and reflecting the official ideology of "reverence for the emperor and patriotism" then current. A distinctive feature of Pozdneev's reader was that the Japanese text was rendered in the Latin alphabet, with names and terms given separately in kana and kanji. Its two parts contained 37 texts covering all the key events of Japanese mythology and history, from the goddess Amaterasu to the First Sino-Japanese War. Its compiler claimed the reader covered the figures and names best known in Japan, whose memory recurs throughout the country's stories, conversation, theatre, painting, and sculpture. According to A. Dybovsky and O. Yelantseva, however, the reader had been produced in haste and was methodologically underdeveloped: its structure made it unusable without the original Japanese textbook it was based on, and its Latin-script rendering could serve only for dictation exercises. Its Russian prose, moreover, was rough and error-ridden in many places, something Pozdneev himself acknowledged in his preface, where he stated that he had produced a strictly interlinear translation for teaching purposes.

Spalvin's 78-page review, published in the Bulletin of the Oriental Institute, was extremely harsh — described by Vladislav Goreglyad as mocking in tone — and reflected above all the state of their relationship during Pozdneev's 1904–1906 directorship. Spalvin made no mention at all of the reader's positive qualities; instead, illustrating numerous errors with heavy irony, he offered a great many judgments about its author's character, arguing that Pozdneev's command of Japanese and general erudition were inadequate for the task of preparing teaching materials. The translations in the reader, he found, contained a great many lexical and grammatical errors arising from an over-literal approach, ignoring set phrases and producing awkward Russian collocations. Yet in the heat of polemic Spalvin often failed to offer a better solution himself: rejecting Pozdneev's rendering of 用水池 (yōsui ike) as a "reservoir pond," for instance, Spalvin substituted "water reservoir," even though the original Japanese term still meant, essentially, a pond.

In 1909, Pozdneev published a Reply to the 'Critical Review of the Japanese Historical Reader, matched in tone to his opponent's review. He cited the opinion of an unnamed Vladivostok "layman" who claimed Spalvin had no real knowledge of the Japanese language or literature, thereby casting doubt on his competence — even though surviving correspondence between the two shows Pozdneev himself, at the time, pressing Spalvin to hurry up and submit his review, evidently regarding him then as competent enough. Pozdneev accused Spalvin of never having written anything about Japan for a general readership, and firmly rejected what he called Spalvin's lecturing, dictatorial, high-handed tone. He did concede a number of the more obvious errors Spalvin had identified, while ignoring several of his genuinely important points; at the same time, seizing on debatable aspects of Spalvin's proposed translations, he used them to argue that Spalvin himself was the less competent of the two. The dispute also extended to lexical and grammatical points in the reader's lesson-by-lesson glossary: of the 91 problem passages Spalvin had identified, Pozdneev addressed only 13. He refused, for example, to accept the grammatical function of the particles -domo (ども, "although") and -goto (ごと, "every"), or of the honorific auxiliary verb -tamau (たまふ, "bestow, give"), basing his objection solely on the English glosses given for these elements in Brinkley's authoritative dictionary. Overall, in the assessment of Dybovsky and Yelantseva, Pozdneev's Reply amounted at once to a correction of errors, a stubborn defence of others, and a counterattack on Spalvin's reputation.

=== Censorship and counterintelligence ===
The need for press censorship in Primorsky Krai at the turn of the twentieth century arose because private subscriptions to foreign periodicals had come to exceed sales of the foreign press through bookshops. Subscribers mainly took English-language papers — the North China Herald, the Globe, The Daily Telegraph, the Nagasaki Press, and the British Trade Journal — most of which arrived from Osaka, Japan's largest domestic and export market; such publications were needed by commercial agents and representatives of foreign companies as well as by public organizations. The Society of Naval Physicians, for instance, subscribed to The Lancet, the Berliner klinische Wochenschrift, and the Semaine Médicale. The postal service's regular censors could not keep up, since they had no command of foreign languages, particularly Asian ones, and no proper censorship committees existed locally given the small size of the Russian-language press in the region. The situation had become absurd: publications were sent all the way to Moscow for censorship review, so that fresh newspapers from Nagasaki reached their recipients two months late instead of within three days, rendering the foreign news they carried essentially pointless. The leadership of the Main Directorate for Press Affairs recognized that this information vacuum in the empire's outlying regions would only encourage rumour. As a result, by an order of the Minister of Internal Affairs of 30 January 1901, censorship of publications in Japanese, Chinese, Mongolian, and Manchu was assigned to the Conference of the Oriental Institute.

Immediately after Spalvin joined the Oriental Institute, its director put him in charge of censoring the Japanese press; he took up this work on 27 March 1901. The Institute's building had no proper space for it, and bundles of newspapers were simply dumped in the courtyard. Spalvin later recalled that the work was physically demanding, since old and new newspapers had to be sorted outdoors in all weather, year-round; in bad weather he had to work in the library instead, where students and censor got in each other's way. He marked passages he judged to be clear breaches of the censorship regulations and then drew up a dated report on the copies received. Subscribers received several copies of an issue at once, often with pages blacked out or cut away. Judging from Spalvin's 1901 reports, the Japanese newspapers held little political interest; they were most often subscribed to by the Japanese Club, mainly for their satirical columns and cartoons. Japanese residents in Siberia subscribed to papers from Osaka, while those in Vladivostok took theirs from Nagasaki or Hakodate; almost no one subscribed to the official Tokyo papers. Before long, Spalvin was noting in his reports the futility of censoring the Japanese press at all, since subscribers could get much the same material through English-, French-, and German-language papers published in China, Japan, and Korea, making any effort to police the Japanese and Chinese papers alone essentially pointless given the press's remarkable solidarity across borders. From 10 April 1901, by order of the Governor-General, the Oriental Institute's Conference was also required to review publications in European languages and to permit or ban the sale of books from Korea, China, and Japan; catalogues of already-reviewed works were sent from the Foreign Censorship Committee in Petersburg, and only titles absent from those lists needed review locally. Books approved with cuts were returned to their owners with the offending pages removed, while banned titles were forwarded to customs. It also turned out that Vladivostok had no local Japanese readership for serious literary or scholarly works. Over the course of 1901, Spalvin and his colleagues — Grigory Podstavin, Apollinary Rudakov, and Pyotr Schmidt — processed 1,882 volumes of Japanese books (608 titles) and some 2,926,200 individual newspaper issues.

On 14 November 1902, Spalvin was appointed head of the censorship department, handing over the Institute's library to N. V. Küner. Between 27 March and 31 December 1902, the Institute's censorship office received 955 bundles of Japanese newspapers, 1,486 of Chinese ones, and 2 of Russian, for a total of 2,443; 3,600 pages were cut from them. It also emerged that the Japanese papers reaching Russia had already been censored in Japan itself, with everything concerning Russian activity in Manchuria removed — though this did nothing to soften their generally anti-Russian tone.

Spalvin began cooperating with military counterintelligence after an incident on 3 July 1902, when three Japanese nationals were detained between the Slavyanka tract and Cherkasskaya station carrying notebooks recording the positions of Russian imperial army units. A. M. Pozdneyev concluded the men had been engaged in espionage but could not translate the notes precisely, and passed the notebooks to Spalvin, who managed to work out the cipher based on the kanji used; the fully translated notebooks were handed over on 17 August to the chief of staff of the Vladivostok fortress. By January 1904 the Oriental Institute had ceased censoring the Japanese press: with war looming, the number of foreign publications reaching Vladivostok fell sharply, and the Minister of Internal Affairs created a dedicated censor's post instead. Students and faculty nonetheless continued to be called on by the censorship authorities in the years that followed.

=== Librarian of the Oriental Institute ===
On 16 September 1900, the Governor-General of Priamurye signed an order appointing acting professor Y. G. Spalvin to the post of librarian. A unanimous recommendation had been given by the Conference of the Oriental Institute on 31 August. At that time, however, he had not yet had the opportunity to fully prove himself as the builder of the library, chiefly because he was occupied with censorship duties. In 1902 the post of librarian was taken over by N. V. Küner, followed by P. P. Schmidt and N. N. Dmitriev, and it was only in 1906 that Spalvin returned to the post. That year the library received a two-tier system of governance, overseen both by the Conference and by a library commission which, besides the librarian (elected for a three-year term), included two members elected for the length of an academic year. On 27 February 1906 the commission, in addition to Spalvin, comprised Pyotr Petrovich Schmidt and Nikolai Ivanovich Kokhanovsky. In the 1909 elections Kokhanovsky was replaced by Nikolai Nikolaevich Dmitriev, and in 1912 the commission was re-elected for a third term. For Spalvin this meant uninterrupted leadership of the library, the printing house, and the editorial office of scholarly publications, since the library commission had decided to bring these functions together under its authority. When the Far Eastern State University was founded, Y. G. Spalvin became chairman of the provisional board of the fundamental library and head of the library commission. The post of librarian carried great weight in higher education of the nineteenth century, since it was largely the librarian on whom the provision of both the teaching and the scholarly process at an institute or university depended. For performing these duties the professor received a salary supplement of 500 rubles a year.

During business trips to Japan in 1903, 1906, and 1909, Y. G. Spalvin acquired the publications the library needed. Thus, in 1903 he acquired a large amount of literature on Japanese studies, along with books on trade, economics, and industry. In preparing for the 1906 trip, Spalvin requested the purchase of 25 copies of Alexandrov's English–Russian dictionary, 10 copies of Makarov's French–Russian dictionary, and 10 copies of Scott and Bray's English Commercial Reader. For the needs of state-funded scholarship students, orders were placed for between 5 and 30 copies each of the Russian–Chinese dictionary published by the Beijing Ecclesiastical Mission (of Bishop Innokenty Figurovsky); the Russian–Chinese dictionary by Popov; the Chinese–Russian dictionary by Peshchurov; the Chinese–Russian dictionary by Palladius and Popov, and so on. At Spalvin's insistence, the Institute's Conference took out a subscription to the eleventh edition of the Encyclopædia Britannica (a set printed on India paper cost 30 pounds sterling and 9 shillings), the 20-volume Russian Encyclopedia (at 3 rubles 60 kopecks per volume), and so on. The guiding principles were the acquisition of the newest specialized books and subscription to periodicals.

Reporting to the Institute's Conference in 1908, Y. G. Spalvin specified that over the period 1899–1907 appropriations for the library had totaled 42,895 rubles 77 kopecks, but had been distributed extremely unevenly. With an average annual expenditure of 5,300 rubles, this figure was twice as high in the first year and three and a half times lower in 1902. The budget was allocated roughly as follows: 2,000 rubles for subscriptions to periodicals from Far Eastern countries and "the most essential scholarly journals of Russia"; 500 rubles for supplies, including catalogue cards; 150 rubles for mailing the "Izvestiya of the Oriental Institute" to recipients abroad. The remaining 2,500 rubles covered the cost of publishing instructors' teaching aids and the binding of books and journals. No more than 1,000 rubles, and rarely more, remained for actual book purchases. The subscription list, however, was very extensive: 149 titles of newspapers and journals, including 20 in Russian, 5 in Chinese, 15 in Korean, 28 in English, 25 in German, 11 in French, and 45 in Japanese. The librarian cited the authority of the former Russian envoy to Beijing, D. D. Pokotilov, who maintained that even private individuals engaged in the study of China spent no less than 2,000 rubles a year on the latest foreign literature. This meant that the budget of the Oriental Institute's library ought to have been at least 10000 rubles. Under the existing conditions it was impossible to maintain a complete, multi-disciplinary library. This argument formed the basis of a report to the Minister of Public Education. The appeal was apparently heeded: in 1908 the Institute was inspected by Secretary of State V. N. Kokovtsov, and in March 1911 an inspection was carried out by the Master of the Horse of the Court of His Imperial Majesty, Governor-General N. L. Gondatti. Despite all these appeals, however, the matter of increasing the library's holdings made no progress. By 1912 the library's budget was even below 3,500 rubles (of which only 1,542 rubles went toward book acquisitions). A way out of the situation was found by requiring three mandatory copies of all the Institute's publications and by appealing to private individuals and graduates to send in foreign book catalogues and new releases.

Thanks to Y. G. Spalvin's work, the library, which he had taken over in 1900 with a collection of around 6,000 volumes, grew to 120000 items and came to include an almost exhaustive collection of Oriental studies literature from the first quarter of the twentieth century. The library enjoyed a high reputation not only in Russia but abroad as well. This gave rise to numerous problems, chief among them a shortage of space for both the book depository and the reading room.

=== Y. G. Spalvin as journal editor ===
==== Izvestiya Vostochnogo instituta and Sovremennaya letopis Dal'nego Vostoka ====
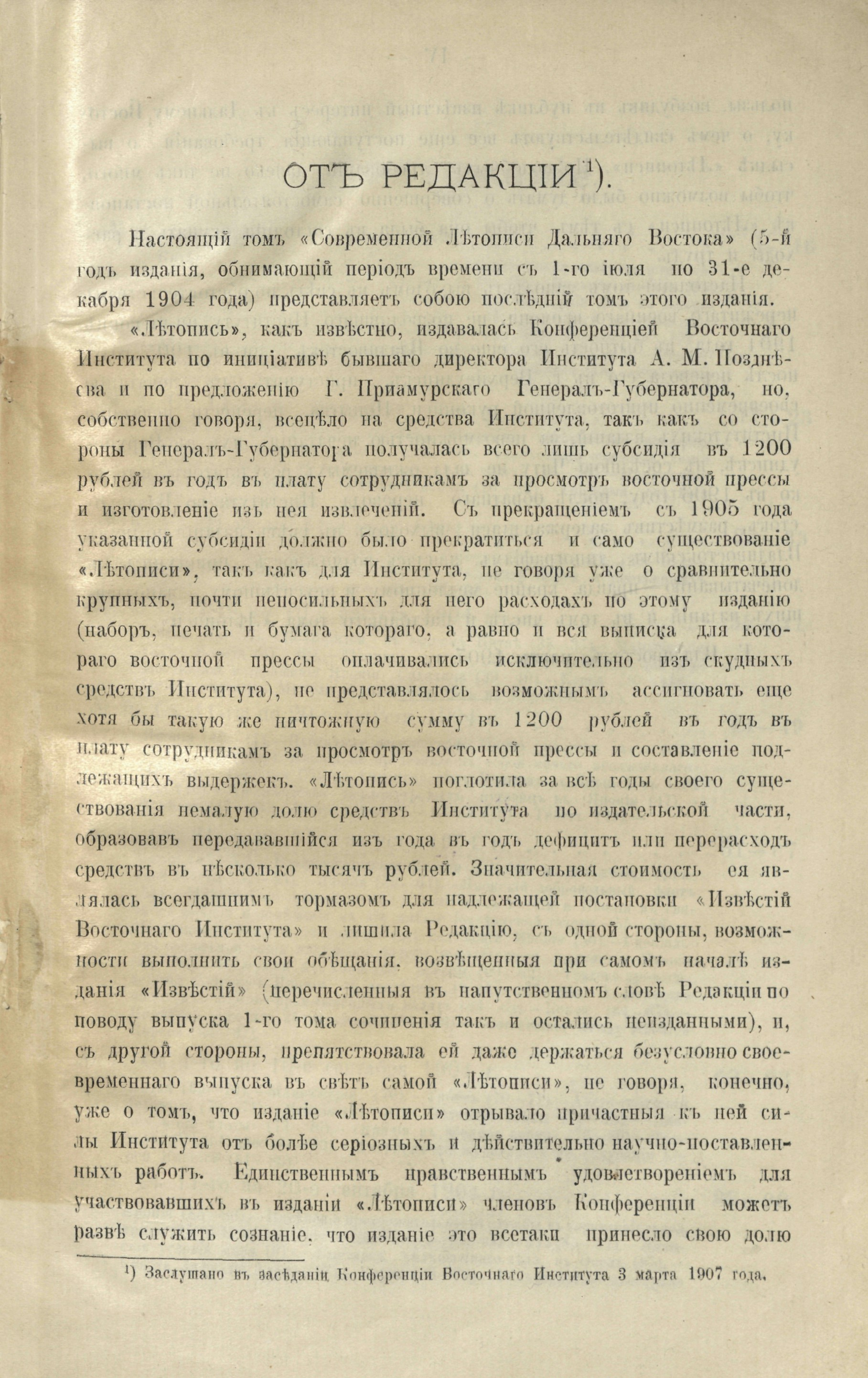
Announcement of the discontinuation of the Chronicle.

From his very first days at the Oriental Institute, Y. G. Spalvin was drawn into the editorial board of Izvestiya Vostochnogo instituta, a journal founded by the director V. M. Pozdneev. Its very first issue was presented to the Sovereign Emperor and began to be sent out to scholarly institutions abroad. The format established at that time was maintained for almost two decades — the publication of the latest teaching aids, along with applied research on questions of linguistics, history, geography, and the economics of Asian countries.

On 11 November 1900, at a meeting of the Institute's Conference, Y. Spalvin also set out his ideas on publishing an information digest, Sovremennaya letopis Dal'nego Vostoka. This publication was to cover matters of current politics in China, Korea, and Japan. Evgeny Genrikhovich proposed three subject sections: domestic and foreign policy, the material culture of society, and intellectual life. Spalvin intended to reserve the bulk of the material for the Japanese direction, pointing to the need to analyze that country's policy in light of its growing military strength and its external expansion in Korea. Japan was also regarded as Russia's potential military adversary in Asia. The first issue of the Chronicle was dated August, covering events from 25 July to 5 August 1900. The plan was to publish the journal every ten days, making material from more than a hundred periodicals in Asian and European languages available to the Russian reader. The Governor-General of Priamurye took an interest in the initiative and allocated an annual subsidy of 1,200 rubles for publishing needs. However, after the outbreak of the Russo-Japanese War the funding stopped. Spalvin, then acting director of the Institute, asked for the funding to be resumed, stating that he had been ready to resume publication since the summer of 1904. There was no reply. The 1905 initiatives likewise failed to rouse any enthusiasm from higher authorities, and publication ceased for good.

After Y. G. Spalvin's election as librarian of the Oriental Institute in 1906, his duties also came to include managing the printing house and editing Izvestiya Vostochnogo instituta, some issues of which had fallen behind schedule. Evgeny Genrikhovich succeeded in restoring the work of the editorial board, and by 1908 the print run of the Bulletin had reached 1,100 copies. The list of institutions and individuals receiving free copies numbered 235 that same year, ranging from the Sovereign Emperor and members of the Imperial House (including Grand Dukes Michael Alexandrovich, Konstantin Konstantinovich, and Alexander Mikhailovich). The mailing list also included the Chairman of the Council of Ministers, ten ministers, the Asiatic Department, and a number of institutions of the Priamurye Governorate-General, including the Governor-General himself, the Archbishop of Vladivostok, and the commander of naval forces in the Pacific. By 1911 the list had grown to include the geography office of Kazan University and the Dobroflot agency in Nagasaki.

==== Vostochnaya Studiya ====
During 1924–1925 the Oriental Faculty of the Far Eastern State University (FESU) published the journal Vostochnaya Studiya. At least 22 issues appeared, of which only Nos. 3 and 10 were not compiled and edited by Y. G. Spalvin, who also served as its editor-in-chief. The publication's concept was made public in the form of "Extracts from the Provisional Regulations on the Publication of 'Vostochnaya Studiya'" in the third issue. This material shows that on 23 August 1924 the FESU board "recognized it as possible to publish the orientalist bulletin 'Vostochnaya Studiya' using funds allocated from the budgets of the Oriental Faculty's offices, with the introduction into the journal of sections corresponding to the names of the offices." The offices had been created during the university's 1923 reform and existed under four of the Oriental Faculty's eighteen departments (Chinese studies, Japanese studies, the history and culture of East Asia, and the economics and politics of East Asia and the USSR). The offices were meant to coordinate students' classroom and practical work, supplying them, under conditions of scarcity, with the latest literature and visual aids. An editorial article in the inaugural issue stated that the journal was intended for the Oriental Faculty of the FESU, reflecting "the scholarly and educational life of the faculty and the gradual progress of achievements in Oriental studies"; it was "an unfailing companion, above all, of the young generation of future orientalists ... on their path toward the ideals of practical Oriental studies".

The editorial board meeting at which the "Provisional Regulations" were adopted was held under the chairmanship of Y. G. Spalvin on 2 September 1924. Publication was to begin on 15 September. The editorial board oversaw six main sections of the journal, tied to the offices of the Oriental Faculty, with an Oriental studies chronicle and bibliography also provided for. As publication continued, other sections appeared as well: "Chronicle of the Far East," "Names and Figures of the Far East," and "Literary Section." FESU's plan called for 42 issues of the journal, each 16 pages long. In fact, up to March 1922, while Y. Spalvin was able to attend to editorial matters, only 22 issues appeared, of which only one was compiled by the dean's office and one by the office of the history and culture of the countries of East Asia. Of the planned educational series within the journal, only Spalvin's manual on katakana for the first stage of instruction was published. Typesetting was done on a typewriter on A4-format paper, with blind printing and no spacing between lines. The required characters of Oriental scripts were drawn by hand, although a Japanese typewriter was available for katakana and hiragana. Illustrations were redrawn from Japanese publications by A. A. Leifert. The finished layout was reproduced on a mimeograph in a print run of 150 copies. There were plans to move to typographic printing, but this was prevented by a shortage of funds. The intention was to put 100 copies up for sale and to solicit donations from private individuals. To raise the publication's standing, the first issue printed the answers to a questionnaire addressed to Soviet, Party, and military leaders of various ranks, asking exactly what kind of Oriental studies the Soviet Republic required. The March 1925 issue announced ambitious plans to expand the journal and to publish new teaching aids by Y. Spalvin and his colleagues, but after his transfer to the structures of the People's Commissariat for Foreign Affairs (NKID) and his departure for Japan, the journal ceased to exist.

The total volume of all issues of the journal (physically there were 10, since a number of the numbers were combined) came to 368 pages. The principal author was Y. Spalvin, who over the course of six months published 12 articles, thematic surveys of newspapers in Oriental languages, and notes totaling roughly five conventional publisher's sheets; 50 captions to illustrations bore his initials; he published a number of translations of Japanese poetry and prose, not to mention that he was the compiler or at least co-author of letters, questionnaires, commentaries, and promotional texts. The combined issue No. 13–16, sent to press on 15 March 1925, contained a note by E. D. Polivanov concerning the questionnaire on the needs and tasks of the new Soviet Oriental studies. In the Moscow scholar's view, Soviet Oriental studies should become a mouthpiece of Leninism and revolution, capable of "conveying the signal of October to the East," with its methodological core to be "the Marxist method".

=== Spalvin as translator, and the conflict with Pilnyak ===
When Spalvin arrived in Japan in April 1925 as embassy secretary, he described himself in an interview with a Japanese journalist in roughly these terms: his specialty, he said, was Japanese literature; he had earlier studied the Man'yōshū (Collection of Ten Thousand Leaves) and the Kokin Wakashū (Collection of Poems Ancient and Modern), but had more recently focused on modern Japanese literature. He listed several works he had translated or was completing for publication in Moscow — among them Kurata Hyakuzō's The Priest and His Disciples and Horiguchi Daigaku's The Six-Inch Flute, a play based on the story of Captain Amakasu that had appeared the previous spring in the journal Gakan (Our View), the Edo-period folk song Black Hair (Kuroi Kami), and a piece by Mushanokōji titled For a Woman (Onna no Hito no Tame ni), all of which he said had already been published. He mentioned also having translated "The Death of a Virgin" (Shōjo no Shi), though he considered it too specifically Japanese to be readily understood by a foreign readership without further explanation. Among better-known Japanese authors, he said he had translated selections from Nobori Shōmu and from Dr. Torii Ryūzō's writings — specifically material on the Primorsky Krai drawn from the journal Northeast Asia (Tōhoku Ajia).

Although Spalvin spoke confidently about these translations as if they had already been published, none of the surviving lists of his works mention them. This episode of unrealized publications is tied to another personal conflict typical of Spalvin. The Soviet writer Boris Pilnyak, who was travelling the world — including Japan — on the crest of his literary success, promised Spalvin on his way back from Tokyo to Moscow that he would publish a translation of a play by the proletarian playwright Akita Ujaku, "The Age of the Merciless Slaughter of Infants." A letter from Spalvin to O. Kameneva dated 24 November 1926 mentions a further set of translations for which fees had been promised. Through the head of VOKS, the japanologist also sent a special letter to Pilnyak. The correspondence that followed, not all of which has been recovered, led to a deterioration in their relationship. Pilnyak had a low opinion both of the Japanese literary works and of the quality of their translation. Several further incidents followed, which raised the level of mutual ill will.

Pilnyak spoke of Spalvin in openly hostile terms in his 1933 book Stones and Roots. He accused the japanologist of creating a distorted image of Japan, placing him in the same category as Loti, Hearn, Farrère, and Kellermann. In Pilnyak's assessment, Spalvin was one of those scholars who, for all his learning, confused a thousand years of history while studying the millennium-old Murasaki Shikibu, and who, apart from that same Murasaki Shikibu, knew little else with any real depth. The French Slavist Dany Savelli suggested that the chapter on prostitution in Japan in Pilnyak's book — which drew the most criticism in Soviet publications — was based on material supplied by Spalvin. In terms of content, it does indeed correspond to an essay in Spalvin's own book Japan: A View from the Outside, in which Japanese eroticism is treated from a highly distinctive point of view. That essay was heavily cut by Japanese censorship.

== Y. G. Spalvin's library and art collections ==
After the scholar's death, his library, archive, and collection — which occupied two rooms in his Harbin apartment — remained behind. Some researchers, including V. E. Molodyakov, have claimed that Spalvin's collection was lost. Documents show that in December 1933 his widow petitioned the board of the Chinese Eastern Railway (CER) Society to extend her free residence in the apartment, since she had not managed to settle the fate of her late husband's collections. As a result, Elizaveta-Kaoru Spalvina continued living on Girin Street until May 1934, when N. A. Setnitsky moved into the apartment. The japanologist V. N. Goreglyad reported, apparently on the basis of personal observations and communications, that as early as 1935 a substantial part of Spalvin's manuscript and book collection had reached the Institute of Oriental Studies of the USSR Academy of Sciences (IOS), where the Japanese section was headed by N. I. Konrad. Although the inventory ledgers from the mid-1930s were destroyed during the Siege of Leningrad, some materials have survived in the archive. Thus, on 8 January 1935 a letter reached the Soviet Control Commission under the Council of People's Commissars of the USSR from the director of the IOS, Academician A. N. Samoylovich, stating that Spalvin's library had been located. Its total volume came to 9 crates weighing 1,310 kg, and it was already sitting in a Leningrad warehouse. According to a further account from May 1935, sorting and initially describing Spalvin's library took the institute three and a half months.

As of 2018, most of the Japanese books — at least 500 items — in the collection of the IOM RAS bear Spalvin's bookplates or presentation inscriptions (in particular, from Nobori Shōmu), ownership signatures, and the like. Many other volumes are scattered throughout the wider collection. In the view of K. G. Marandzhyan, even an approximate number of the books in Russian and other European languages is difficult to give. The IOM archive holds a number of Spalvin's typescripts, ranging from his 1909 works Information on Japanese Societies in Vladivostok and The Japanese Societies of the City of Vladivostok. Materials from the Soviet period include 1929 articles on translations of Marxist-Leninist literature into Japanese. The art collection turned out to include a set of 262 postcards, sorted by Spalvin himself into thematic categories and divided into "family" and "collection" sections. These materials directly confirm that the scholar took his personal collection with him when he left Vladivostok, and that he went on diligently adding to it in both Tokyo and Harbin. The collection also includes 34 scenic postcards — for example, Views of Fuji or The Hot Springs of Beppu — and photographic albums of Japanese sights (Matsushima or Lake Wada), two chapters of which are devoted to in the book Japan: A View from the Outside. There are also materials of an erotic character, so-called "spring pictures," though not printed originals but albums of their reproductions. Spalvin's collection also included early erotic photographs. K. G. Marandzhyan noted that this part of the scholar's collection deserved separate study and would be examined in an article then being prepared for publication, but the researcher died without ever carrying out her plan.

== Bibliography ==
- Dybovsky, A.S. (2007). Первый профессиональный японовед России : Опыт латвийско-российско-японского исследования жизни и деятельности Е. Г. Спальвина [The First Professional Japanologist of Russia: A Latvian-Russian-Japanese Study of the Life and Work of E. G. Spalvin] (collected scholarly articles) (in Russian). Print run: 500 copies. Vladivostok: Far Eastern University Press. p. 188.
