= Japanese in Russia =

Japanese in Russia may refer to:

- Japanese people in Russia, consisting mainly of Japanese expatriates and their descendants born in Russia
- Japanese language education in Russia

== See also ==
- Japanese prisoners of war in the Soviet Union
