= Polivanov system =

System of transcription of the Japanese language into Russian Cyrillic script

Polivanov system is a system of transliterating the Japanese language into Russian Cyrillic script, either to represent Japanese proper names or terms in Russian, or as an aid to Japanese language learning in Russian and potentially other languages utilizing the Cyrillic script. The system was developed by Yevgeny Polivanov in 1917.

In terms of spelling the system is a middle ground between Kunrei-shiki and Hepburn romanisations, matching the former everywhere except for morae hu and tu, which are spelled as in Hepburn (fu and tsu), moras starting with z (which are spelled with dz, as in archaic Hepburn, but following the consistency of Kunrei-shiki with Jun being spelled as Dzyun) and syllabic n, which is changed to m before b, p and m as in traditional Hepburn.

The following cyrillization system for Japanese is known as the Yevgeny Polivanov system. Note that it has its own spelling conventions and does not necessarily constitute a direct phonetic transcription of the pronunciation into the standard Russian usage of the Cyrillic alphabet.

== Main table ==
Hiragana and Katakana to Polivanov cyrillization correspondence table, for single/modified kana.

Kana		Cyrillic	Hepburn
あ	ア	а	a
か	カ	ка	ka
さ	サ	са	sa
た	タ	та	ta
な	ナ	на	na
は	ハ	ха	ha
ま	マ	ма	ma
や	ヤ	я	ya
ら	ラ	ра	ra
わ	ワ	ва	wa
ん	ン	-н	-n
が	ガ	га	ga
ざ	ザ	дза	za
だ	ダ	да	da
ば	バ	ба	ba
ぱ	パ	па	pa

Kana		Cyrillic	Hepburn
い	イ	и/й	i
き	キ	ки	ki
し	シ	си	shi
ち	チ	ти	chi
に	ニ	ни	ni
ひ	ヒ	хи	hi
み	ミ	ми	mi
り	リ	ри	ri
ゐ	ヰ	ви	wi
ぎ	ギ	ги	gi
じ	ジ	дзи	ji
ぢ	ヂ	дзи	ji
び	ビ	би	bi
ぴ	ピ	пи	pi

Kana		Cyrillic	Hepburn
う	ウ	у	u
く	ク	ку	ku
す	ス	су	su
つ	ツ	цу	tsu
ぬ	ヌ	ну	nu
ふ	フ	фу	fu
む	ム	му	mu
ゆ	ユ	ю	yu
る	ル	ру	ru
ぐ	グ	гу	gu
ず	ズ	дзу	zu
づ	ヅ	дзу	zu
ぶ	ブ	бу	bu
ぷ	プ	пу	pu

Kana		Cyrillic	Hepburn
え	エ	э	e
け	ケ	кэ	ke
せ	セ	сэ	se
て	テ	тэ	te
ね	ネ	нэ	ne
へ	ヘ	хэ	he
め	メ	мэ	me
れ	レ	рэ	re
ゑ	ヱ	вэ	we
げ	ゲ	гэ	ge
ぜ	ゼ	дзэ	ze
で	デ	дэ	de
べ	ベ	бэ	be
ぺ	ペ	пэ	pe

Kana		Cyrillic	Hepburn
お	オ	о	o
こ	コ	ко	ko
そ	ソ	со	so
と	ト	то	to
の	ノ	но	no
ほ	ホ	хо	ho
も	モ	мо	mo
よ	ヨ	ё	yo
ろ	ロ	ро	ro
を	ヲ	во	wo
ご	ゴ	го	go
ぞ	ゾ	дзо	zo
ど	ド	до	do
ぼ	ボ	бо	bo
ぽ	ポ	по	po

Kana		Cyrillic	Hepburn
きゃ	キャ	кя	kya
しゃ	シャ	ся	sha
ちゃ	チャ	тя	cha
にゃ	ニャ	ня	nya
ひゃ	ヒャ	хя	hya
みゃ	ミャ	мя	mya
りゃ	リャ	ря	rya
ぎゃ	ギャ	гя	gya
じゃ	ジャ	дзя	ja
ぢゃ	ヂャ	дзя	ja
びゃ	ビャ	бя	bya
ぴゃ	ピャ	пя	pya

Kana		Cyrillic	Hepburn
きゅ	キュ	кю	kyu
しゅ	シュ	сю	shu
ちゅ	チュ	тю	chu
にゅ	ニュ	ню	nyu
ひゅ	ヒュ	хю	hyu
みゅ	ミュ	мю	myu
りゅ	リュ	рю	ryu
ぎゅ	ギュ	гю	gyu
じゅ	ジュ	дзю	ju
ぢゅ	ヂュ	дзю	ju
びゅ	ビュ	бю	byu
ぴゅ	ピュ	пю	pyu

Kana		Cyrillic	Hepburn
きょ	キョ	кё	kyo
しょ	ショ	сё	sho
ちょ	チョ	тё	cho
にょ	ニョ	нё	nyo
ひょ	ヒョ	хё	hyo
みょ	ミョ	мё	myo
りょ	リョ	рё	ryo
ぎょ	ギョ	гё	gyo
じょ	ジョ	дзё	jo
ぢょ	ヂョ	дзё	jo
びょ	ビョ	бё	byo
ぴょ	ピョ	пё	pyo

Syllabic n (ん/ン) is spelled м (m) before b, p, m, and spelled нъ before vowels.

Grammar particles は and へ are written ва and э. Syllable を is written either во or о depending on pronunciation (albeit о is more preferred).

== Diphthongs ==
It is permitted to use й instead of и in diphthongs (e.g. shinjitai → синдзитай, seinen → сэйнэн). However, и is always used on a morpheme clash: Kawai (kawa + i) → Каваи.

Yevgeny Polivanov recommended (but not prescribed as mandatory) to use й for Sino-Japanese (on'yomi) words, and и for native Japanese (kun'yomi) words. Another Polinanov's recommendation is to spell the diphthong ei as a long vowel э:, but this recommendation is almost never followed in practice. Instead, long vowel ē in the name ending -bē is often transliterated as -эй, e.g. Gonbē → Гомбэй.

== Geminate consonants ==
Consonants are geminated exactly as they are in romaji: e.g. -kk- > -кк-.

== Long vowels ==
Long vowels may be marked by macron as in Hepburn, but since letter ё has a diacritical mark already it is permitted and much more common to mark long vowels by using a colon (e.g. сё:гун). The sequence ei may be written э:, эй or эи. In regular texts long vowels are usually unmarked.

== Vowel omission ==
Normally, vowels in the Polivanov system are always spelled, even if they are not pronounced. However, the voiceless u in the name ending -suke may be omitted:

Ryūnosuke → Рюноскэ.

Some translators tend to omit voiceless u in all cases when su (and, less often, tsu) is followed by a k-syllable, e.g. Akatsuki → Акацки, Daisuki → Дайски. However, this omission is considered non-standard.

Another non-standard (if not controversial) practice is omitting the voiceless u at the end of words, mostly in desu → дэс and masu → мас. This spelling can be found in some learning materials, but most professional translators oppose it, because native speakers may pronounce su at the end of the word with a distinctive u sound (especially in "feminine" speech).

== Common mistakes and deviations ==
In English texts, Japanese names are written with the Hepburn system. Attempts may be made to transcribe these as if they were English, rather than following a dedicated Japanese Cyrillization scheme.

A common example of this is attempting to transcribe shi (Polivanov: си) as ши and ji (Polivanov: дзи) as джи. This is inadvisable for use in Russian, because ши is actually pronounced like шы in Russian, and джи like джы, thus making the vowel (/ɨ/) closer to Japanese /u/ than to Japanese /i/. Whereas, щи would have a correct vowel sound, but be pronounced more like Japanese sshi.

Equally often, people transcribe cha, chi, chu, cho as ча, чи, чу, чо. This is phonetically correct, but does not conform with the Polivanov scheme (тя, ти, тю, тё), which more closely resembles the Kunrei-shiki romanisations (tya, ti, tyu, tyo) for these particular characters.

Sometimes е, rather than э, is used for e, despite е being pronounced ye in Russian (though not in other languages). This is typically not done in the initial position, despite older romanisations such as "Yedo" doing so. In any case, it does not conform with the Polivanov scheme, although it is seen as more acceptable for words that are in general use (e.g. kamikaze > камикадзе instead of камикадзэ). Replacing ё (yo) with е (ye) is incorrect, however, as it will change the Japanese word too much.

The sound yo (Polivanov: ё), when in the initial position or after a vowel, is often written as йо (yo), which has the same pronunciation: Ёкосука -> Йокосука (Yokosuka), Тоёта -> Тойота (Toyota). Although, the spelling "йо" is not common in Russian words, these are more generally accepted for Japanese names than the transliterations using "ё". "Ё" is not often used in Japanese Cyrillization due to its facultative use in the Russian language (and possible substitution with the letter "Е" which would affect the pronunciation), but for professional translators, the use of ё is mandatory. Some personal names beginning with "Yo" (or used after a vowel) are written using "Ё" (e.g. Йоко for Yoko Ono, but Ёко for Yoko Kanno and all other Yokos).

== Exceptions ==
Some proper names, for historical reasons, do not follow the above rules. For example, the geographical names of Japan in Russian are transmitted according to special instructions for the transfer of geographical names (other language names, for example from the Ainu language, do not fall under the Polivanov system). Other Japanese names and concepts were adapted into Russian from other languages (for example, under the influence of Hepburn or other transliteration systems). Those include but are not limited to:

Examples
English (Rōmaji)	Russian spelling	Cyrillization	Japanese
Japan (Nihon, Nippon)	Япония	Нихон, Ниппон	日本 (にほん, にっぽん)
Tokyo (Tōkyō)	Токиo	То:кё:	東京 (とうきょう)
Kyoto (Kyōto)	Киото	Кё:то	京都 (きょうと)
Yokohama	Иокогама (also Йокохама)	Ёкохама	横浜 (よこはま)
Yokosuka	Йокосука	Ёкосука	横須賀 (よこすか)
Toyota	Тойота (Тоёта in older publications)	Тоёта	トヨタ (originally: 豊田)
jujitsu (jūjutsu)	джиу-джитсу	дзю:дзюцу	柔術 (じゅうじゅつ)
sushi	суши	суси	すし, 寿司, 鮨, 鮓, 寿し
yen (en)	иена	эн	円 (えん)

== See also ==
- Japanese language education in Russia
- Romanization of Japanese
- Cyrillization of Japanese
