= Dembei =

Japanese fisherman and castaway

Dembei (Japanese: 伝兵衛, romanized: Dembei; IPA: [dẽ̞mbe̞ː]; Dembei, Russian: Дэмбэй, romanized: Dembey; IPA: [dɨmˈbɛj]) was a Japanese castaway who, through Vladimir Atlasov, provided Russia with some of its first knowledge of Japan.

== Biography ==
He was a merchant clerk accompanying a fleet of "thirty transports laden with goods for Edo," which had been caught in a storm; they found their way to Kamchatka and were found by Atlasov in 1701 or 1702. Despite pleading to be brought back to Japan, Dembei and another young Japanese person (who did not survive long) were instead brought to Saint Petersburg, where he told Peter the Great what he could about Japan. He taught some of the Japanese language to a few Russians, making him the father of Japanese language education in Russia. He was baptized as Gabriel and spent the rest of his life in Saint Petersburg.

Although it is unlikely that Dembei had any significant knowledge of Japan's politics or military organization or anything else that might prove particularly strategic to the Russians, it roused Russia's interest for exploration of Kamchatka and the Kurils, and for attempting to open up trade with Japan.

Some time between 1714 and 1719, he met traveller John Bell, who gave the following account:

...I saw at St. Petersburg a young man, a native of Japan, who, I believe, is yet alive in the Academy of Sciences at that place. I asked him, by what accident he was brought so far from his own country; and he gave me the following account. That his father and himself, with a few persons more, being at a noted town called Naggisaky, on the west coast of the island, employed about some affairs of trade, and having finished their business, intended to return to their own habitations, on the north shore, by sailing round the coast. Therefore went they on board a small boat, and begun their voyage homeward; but, meeting with a strong gale off the land, they were unfortunately driven out to sea; and, in a few days, were cast upon the coast of Kamtzatsky, half-starved, and in the greatest distress. In this condition they met with a Russian officer, who afforded them all that assistance which common humanity dictates on such occasions. Notwithstanding all his care, several of the old people died; being quite spent with fatigue, and want of victuals. That he and another youth, who was since dead, were sent to St. Petersburg, where his Majesty was pleased to order that they should be provided for in the Academy. This young man could read and write both the Japanese and Russian languages."

== See also ==
- Japanese people in Russia
