= Nikolai Konrad =

Nikolai Iosifovich Konrad (Russian: Николай Иосифович Конрад; 13 March 1891 – 30 September 1970) was a Soviet philologist and historian, described in the Great Soviet Encyclopedia as "the founder of the Soviet school of Japanese scholars".

== Life ==
Konrad was born in Riga to a German father who was a railway engineer while his mother was the daughter of a priest from the Oryol Governorate. He studied at the Oriental Faculty of Saint Petersburg University, attending lectures by Lev Sternberg at the Museum of Anthropology and Ethnography. After graduation he traveled to Japan and Korea, studying the languages and undertaking ethnographic study. World War I prevented his return to Russia until 1917.

Konrad then taught at Leningrad University, and became professor of Japanese language and literature there from 1922 to 1939. He knew Mikhail Bakhtin in the 1920s, and Bakhtin later cited Konrad, Dmitry Likhachov and Juri Lotman as the three most important Russian literary theorists.

After his fellow scholar Nikolai Nevsky and his wife were arrested on charges of spying, Konrad found their two-year-old daughter left in their apartment; he brought the girl up as his own after her parents' execution. In 1941 he became professor at the Moscow Institute of Oriental Studies.

== Awards and honors ==
- Two Orders of Lenin (June 10, 1945; March 27, 1954)
- Two Orders of the Red Banner of Labour
- Order of the Rising Sun, 2nd class (1969)
- USSR State Prize

== Works ==
- Zapad i Vostok (West and East), Moscow, 1966. Translated by H. Kasanina and others as West-East, inseparable twain; selected articles. Moscow, 1967
