= Japanese language education in Russia =

Japanese language education in Russia formally dates back to December 1701 or January 1702, when Dembei, a shipwrecked Japanese merchant, was taken to Moscow and ordered to begin teaching the language as soon as possible. A 2006 survey by the Japan Foundation found 451 teachers teaching the language to 9,644 students at 143 institutions; the number of students had grown by 4.8% since the previous year. Aside from one Japanese-medium school serving Japanese people in Russia (the Japanese School in Moscow, founded in 1965), virtually all Japanese language education in Russia throughout history has been aimed at non-native speakers. As of 2024, according to the Japan Foundation, 13,525 people were learning Japanese in Russia.

== History ==
=== Tsarist Russia ===
Russian interest in Japan dated back to the early 17th century, when Flemish cartographer Gerardus Mercator's descriptions of Japan were translated into Russian. (The Russian ambassador to China at the time, Nikolai Spathari, also tried to gather information about Japan.) However, the first real knowledge of the Japanese language would come from Dembei, a shipwrecked native of Japan who had become stranded on the Kamchatka Peninsula. Despite repeated protests and an expressed desire to return to Japan, Dembei was taken to Moscow by Vladimir Atlasov in December 1701 or January 1702 and ordered by Peter the Great to teach Japanese to a small group of young Russian men. It is believed he finally began teaching in 1705. Japanese education in Russia continued throughout the 18th century, using as teachers Japanese fishermen who, like Dembei, drifted ashore in the Russian Far East and, due to the sakoku policy of the Tokugawa Shogunate, found themselves unable to return to Japan. However, Japanese studies were not included in the official programmes of Russian universities until the 1898 establishment of the Department of Japanese Philology at Saint Petersburg University. Soon afterwards, Serge Elisséeff would become the first Russian to undergo higher education in Japan, graduating from Tokyo Imperial University in 1912; however, he did not return to Russia, but instead remained overseas, taking up a post at the Sorbonne in 1917.

=== Soviet era ===
Japanese language education suffered setbacks during the Great Purge. Notable scholars killed during this period include Yevgeny Polivanov, designer of the official system for the Cyrillization of Japanese, and Nikolai Nevskii, who specialised in Okinawan studies. Later, during the Nikita Khrushchev era, increasing numbers of Russians went back to Japan as international students, but few returned to become teachers, due to the low salaries.

=== After the Soviet breakup ===
In the Russian census of 2002, 24,787 people claimed knowledge of the Japanese language, making it the 65th-most known language (behind Vietnamese and ahead of Andian). With only 835 people claiming Japanese ethnicity (nationality) in that census, Japanese is thus one of only two East Asian languages in Russia for which the population of speakers outnumbers the population of the ethnic group to which the language belongs. The other such language is Chinese, which has 59,235 speakers in Russia and is the 44th-most known language, but only 34,577 members of the nationality.

Most students chose Japanese for economic rather than cultural reasons. Study of the language is noted as being most popular in the Russian Far East, especially among Sakhalin Koreans. Also, despite the dispute between Russia and Japan over the Kuril Islands, increasing numbers of Russian people in the southernmost islands, such as Shikotan and Kunashiri, are studying Japanese for purposes of daily communication with Japanese, with whom they come into frequent contact.

Russophone learners of Japanese make both phonological and grammatical errors when speaking the language, due to cross-linguistic interference from Russian.

== Standardised testing ==
The Japanese Language Proficiency Test has been offered in Russia since 1998, at first only in Moscow, but since 2001, in Vladivostok as well. Since the test's introduction, the number of examinees has risen by an average of 21% per year. In 2006, the list of test sites was further expanded to include Khabarovsk, Novosibirsk, and Yuzhno-Sakhalinsk; the number of examinees also showed record growth, more than doubling as compared to the previous year. However, JETRO's Business Japanese Test was not offered in Russia or any other former Soviet Union member state as of 2006.

JLPT examinees in the Commonwealth of Independent States
Year	Country	City	Number of Examinees by Level				
Year	Country	City	L1	L2	L3	L4	Total
2006	Kazakhstan	Almaty	50	98	135	91	374
2006	Russia	Khabarovsk	18	56	89	63	226
2006	Russia	Moscow	64	259	465	374	1,162
2006	Russia	Novosibirsk	12	61	115	82	270
2006	Russia	Vladivostok	23	92	105	85	305
2006	Russia	Yuzhno-Sakhalinsk	5	32	78	89	204
2006	Ukraine	Kyiv	29	89	127	109	354
2006	Uzbekistan	Tashkent	61	111	145	88	405
2005	Kazakhstan	Almaty	28	43	68	25	164
2005	Russia	Moscow	48	197	316	287	848
2005	Russia	Vladivostok	23	56	97	55	231
2005	Ukraine	Kyiv	27	63	120	54	284
2005	Uzbekistan	Tashkent	41	101	122	69	333
2004	Kazakhstan	Almaty	34	63	61	28	186
2004	Russia	Moscow	33	168	265	310	776
2004	Russia	Vladivostok	23	94	58	58	233
2003	Kazakhstan	Almaty	41	87	42	24	194
2003	Russia	Moscow	34	157	224	207	622
2003	Russia	Vladivostok	20	73	61	45	199
2002	Data missing						
2001	Russia	Moscow	34	78	173	159	444
2001	Russia	Vladivostok	17	34	84	38	173
2000	Russia	Moscow	26	120	122	94	362
1999	Russia	Moscow	24	101	135	88	348
1998	Russia	Moscow	-	-	-	-	278

Result for 2013, in 8 sites, June + December sessions : N1: 213 N2: 639 N3: 838 N4: 1078 N5: 1316 Total: 4084 (The number of levels increased to 5 in 2009)

== See also ==
- Cyrillization of Japanese
- Languages of Russia
- List of languages of Russia
- Nikolai Rezanov, first Russian ambassador to Japan and author of an early Russian-Japanese lexicon
- Japanese School in Moscow, which is not a Japanese as a foreign language school, but instead a school for Japanese expatriates
- Russians in Japan
- Japanese as a foreign language
