= Daisuki =

Daisuki may refer to:

- Daisuki (website), a Japanese anime streaming website
- Daisuki (magazine), a German manga magazine
- "Daisuki", a 1997 song by Yuki Uchida
- Daisuki, a Malaysian comic by Kaoru and published by Gempak Starz
- "Daisuki!", a 1997 song by Ryōko Hirosue
- Daisuki!, a Japanese television drama starring Akiko Matsumoto
