= Yevgeny Polivanov =

Soviet linguist, orientalist and polyglot

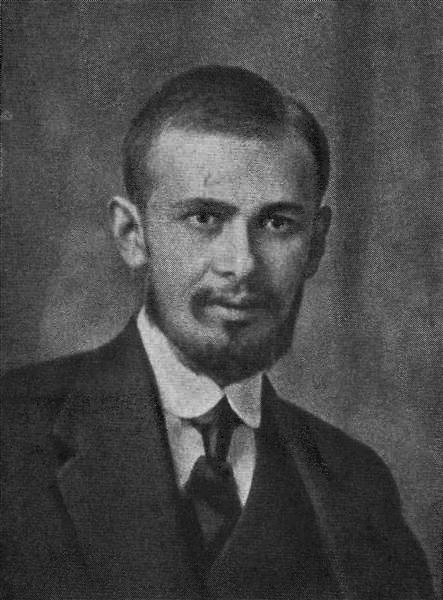
- Born: 12 March [O.S. 28 February] 1891; Smolensk, Russian Empire
- Died: 25 January 1938 (aged 46); Moscow, Soviet Union
- Occupation: Linguist

Yevgeny Dmitrievich Polivanov (Russian: Евге́ний Дми́триевич Полива́нов; 12 March [O.S. 28 February] 1891 – 25 January 1938) was a Soviet linguist, orientalist, and polyglot who wrote major works on the Chinese, Japanese, Uzbek, and Dungan languages and on theoretical linguistics and poetics.

== Life ==
He participated in the development of writing systems for the peoples of the Soviet Union and also designed a cyrillization system for Japanese language, which was officially accepted in the Soviet Union and is still the standard in modern Russia. He also translated the Kyrgyz national Epic of Manas into Russian. Polivanov is credited as the scholar who initiated the comparative study of Japanese pitch accent across dialects.

During the Russian Revolution of 1917, Polivanov was active first in the Menshevik Party, then he joined the Bolshevik Party. He worked in the Oriental section of the People's Commissariat for Foreign Affairs in 1917–1918 and in the Comintern in 1921.

In 1928–1929 he expressed disagreement with Nicholas Marr's Japhetic theory, which was promoted by the regime at the time. After this he was blackballed from all scholarly institutions in Moscow and Leningrad and until his arrest "was essentially in exile in Central Asia, where he accomplished fruitful work on the local languages."

During the Great Purge, Polivanov was arrested on 16 August 1937 in Bishkek and was charged with spying for Japan. On 1 October, in the Butyrka prison, he requested in writing that the NKVD halt severe interrogation methods against him, arguing that they made him issue false statements that confused the investigation against him. On 25 January 1938, he was tried in a closed session of the Military Collegium of the Supreme Court of the USSR and pleaded not guilty. He was sentenced to death and executed by NKVD near Moscow. He was rehabilitated in 1963. In late October 2018, a memorial containing his name alongside over 6,000 others was erected at Kommunarka.

== See also ==
- Cyrillization of Japanese
- Polivanov system
- Georgy Danilov
