= Japanese people in Russia =

Ethnic group in Russia

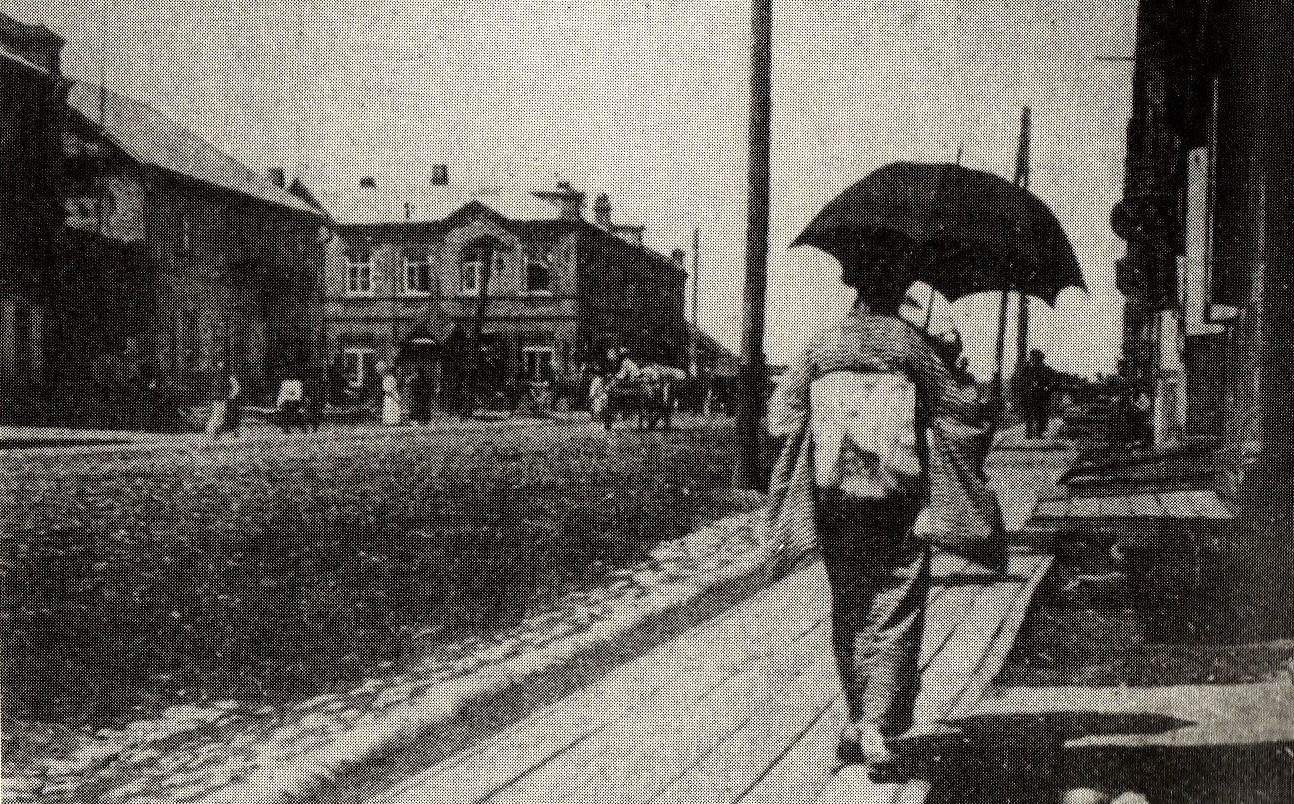
- A kimono-clad woman walks down Svetlanskaya Street in Vladivostok, currently the capital of Primorsky Krai, c. 1910

Total population
- 1,321 (2022)

Regions with significant populations
- Moscow, Primorsky Krai, Sakhalin Oblast

Languages
- Russian, Japanese

Religion
- Buddhism, Shinto, Orthodox Christianity

Related ethnic groups
- Nikkeijin

Japanese people in Russia form a small part of the worldwide community of Nikkeijin (Japanese diaspora), consisting mainly of Japanese expatriates and their descendants born in Russia. They count various notable political figures among their number.

== Early settlement ==
The first Japanese person to settle in Russia is believed to have been Dembei, a merchant clerk stranded on the Kamchatka Peninsula in 1701 or 1702. Unable to return to his native Ōsaka due to the Tokugawa Shogunate's sakoku policy, he was instead taken to Moscow and ordered by Peter the Great to begin teaching the language as soon as possible; he thus became the father of Japanese language education in Russia. Japanese settlement in Russia remained sporadic, confined to the Russian Far East, and also of a largely unofficial character, consisting of fishermen who, like Dembei, landed there by accident and were unable to return to Japan. However, a Japanese trading post is known to have existed on the island of Sakhalin (then claimed by the Qing dynasty, but controlled by neither Japan, China, nor Russia) as early as 1790.

== Opening of Japan ==
Following the opening of Japan, Vladivostok would become the focus of settlement for Japanese emigrating to Russia. A branch of the Japanese Imperial Commercial Agency (日本貿易事務官, Nihon bōeki Jimukan) was opened there in 1876. Their numbers grew to 80 people in 1877 and 392 in 1890; women outnumbered men by a factor of 3:2, and many worked as prostitutes. However, their community remained small compared to the more numerous Chinese and Korean communities; an 1897 Russian government survey showed 42,823 Chinese, 26,100 Koreans, but only 2,291 Japanese in the whole of the Primorye area. A large portion of the migration came from villages in northern Kyūshū.

The politics of Japanese-Russian relations had a large influence on the Japanese community and the sources and patterns of Japanese settlement in Russia. The "Association of Corporations" (同盟会) was founded in 1892 to unite various Japanese professional unions; at that point, the Japanese population of the city was estimated at 1,000. It would later be renamed in 1895 as the "Association of Fellow Countrymen" (同胞会, Dōhōkai) and again in 1902 as the "Vladivostok Resident Association" (ウラジオ居留民会, Urajio Kyoryūminkai). They were often suspected by the Russian government of being used as intelligence-gathering tools for Japan, and having contributed to Russia's defeat in the Russo-Japanese War. Though the Japanese residents' association in Vladivostok was officially disbanded in 1912 under pressure from Russia, Japanese government documents show it continued to operate clandestinely until 1920, when most Japanese in Vladivostok returned to Japan. The initial landing of Japanese forces in Vladivostok after the October Revolution was prompted by the April 4, 1918 murder of three Japanese living there, and the Nikolayevsk Incident which occurred in 1920.

After the establishment of the Soviet Union, some Japanese communists settled in Russia; for example, Mutsuo Hakamada, the brother of Japanese Communist Party chairman Satomi Hakamada, escaped from Japan in 1938 and went to Russia, where he married a local woman. His daughter Irina later went into politics after the collapse of the Soviet Union. According to historian Tetsuro Kato, About 100 Japanese, including communists, went to live in the USSR during the 1920s, and 1930s. Many would be victims of Stalinist Purges.

== Aftermath of World War II ==
=== Sakhalin ===
After the end of the Russo-Japanese War in 1905 with the Treaty of Portsmouth, the southern half of Sakhalin officially became Japanese territory, and was renamed as Karafuto, prompting an influx of Japanese settlers there. Japanese settled in the northern half of Karafuto; after Japan agreed to hand this half back to the Soviet Union, some may have chosen to remain north of the Soviet line of control. However, the majority would remain in Japanese territory until the closing days of World War II, when the whole of Sakhalin came under Soviet control as part of the USSR's invasion of Manchuria; most Japanese fled the advancing Red Army, or returned to Japan after the Soviet takeover, but others, mainly military personnel, were taken to the mainland of Russia and detained in work camps there. Furthermore, roughly 40,000 Korean settlers, despite still holding Japanese nationality, were denied permission by the Soviet Government to transit through Japan to repatriate to their homes in the southern half of the Korean Peninsula. They were either told to take North Korean citizenship or take Soviet citizenship. Known as Sakhalin Koreans, they were trapped on the island for almost four decades.

=== Prisoners of war ===
Following Japan's surrender, 575,000 Japanese prisoners of war captured by the Red Army in Manchuria, Karafuto, and Korea were sent to camps in Siberia and the rest of the Soviet Union. According to figures of the Japanese Ministry of Health, Labour, and Welfare, 473,000 were repatriated to Japan after the normalisation of Japanese-Soviet relations; 55,000 died in Russia, and another 47,000 remained missing; a Russian report released in 2005 listed the names of 27,000 who had been sent to North Korea to perform forced labour there. Rank was no guarantee of repatriation; one Armenian interviewed by the US Air Force in 1954 claims to have met a Japanese general while living in a camp at Chunoyar, Krasnoyarsk Krai between May 1951 and June 1953. Some continue to return home as late as 2006.

== Post-normalisation ==
Following the normalisation of Japanese-Soviet relations, a few Japanese went to Russia for commercial, educational, or diplomatic purposes. There is one Japanese-medium school, the Japanese School in Moscow, founded in 1965.

The 2002 Russian census showed 835 people claiming Japanese ethnicity. The 2021 Russian census recorded 663 citizens who claimed to be ethnic Japanese or Ryukyuans, while 523 individuals stated that Japanese is their native language, including 162 in Moscow, 43 in Saint Petersburg, 31 in Primorsky Krai, 27 in Moscow Oblast, 22 in Stavropol Krai, and 16 in Sakhalin Oblast.

October 2023 figures from Japan's Ministry of Foreign Affairs state that 1,003 Japanese nationals reside in Russia.

== Education ==
The Japanese School in Moscow is a Japanese international day school in Moscow.

There is a part-time Japanese school in Saint Petersburg, the St. Petersburg Japanese Language School, which holds classes at the Anglo-American School Saint Petersburg branch.

== See also ==
- Japan–Russia relations
- Japanese diaspora
- Immigration to Russia
- Russians in Japan
