= Cyrillization of Japanese =

Writing of Japanese Language in Cyrillic script

The cyrillization of Japanese is the process of transliterating or transcribing the Japanese language into Cyrillic script in order to represent Japanese proper names or terms in various languages that use Cyrillic, as an aid to Japanese language learning in those languages or as a potential replacement for the current Japanese writing system. This can be done in an ad hoc fashion (e.g. when "sushi" is transliterated as "суши" in Russian Cyrillic) or using one of a number of systems.

There are a number of cyrillization systems used by different Cyrillic alphabet-based languages, such as:

- The standard and most widely used system for cyrillization into Russian Cyrillic is known as the Polivanov system, named after the Russian and Soviet linguist Yevgeny Polivanov. One of the most arguable questions in this system is a representation of し, ち and じ into "си" (si), "ти" (ti) and "дзи" (dzi) respectively.
- The standard and most widely used (for example, in publications of Taras Shevchenko National University of Kyiv) system for cyrillization into Ukrainian Cyrillic is known as Kovalenko system, named after the Ukrainian linguist Oleksandr Kovalenko.
- Other systems are also used to transcribe Japanese into Ukrainian.

== Sample texts ==
=== Universal Declaration of Human Rights, Article 1 ===
Japanese text	Hepburn	Polivanov	Romanization of Polivanov
すべての人間は、生まれながらにして自由であり、かつ、尊厳と権利と について平等である。人間は、理性と良心とを授けられており、互いに同 胞の精神をもって行動しなければならない。	Subete no ningen wa, umarenagara ni shite jiyū de ari, katsu, songen to kenri to ni tsuite byōdō de aru. Ningen wa, risei to ryōshin to o sazukerarete ori, tagai ni dōhō no seishin o motte kōdō shinakereba naranai.	Субэтэ но нингэн ва, умарэнагара ни ситэ дзию: дэ ари, кацу, сонгэн то кэнри то ни цуитэ бё:до: дэ ару. Нингэн ва, рисэй то рё:син то о садзукэрарэтэ ори, тагаи ни до:хо: но сэйсин о моттэ ко:до: синакэрэба наранай.	Subete no ningen va, umarenagara ni site dziyu: de ari, katsu, songen to kenri to ni tsuite byo:do: de aru. Ningen va, risey to ryo:sin to o sadzukerarete ori, tagai ni do:kho: no seysin o motte ko:do: sinakereba naranay.
