= Prusakov =

Prusakov (Russian: Прусаков), feminine: Prusakova is a Russian surname. Notable people with the surname include:

- Dmitry Prusakov
- Lana Prusakova (born 2000), Russian freestyle skier
- Maria Prusakova (born 1983), Russian politician
- Marina Prusakova (born 1941), Russian-American pharmacist and widow of Lee Harvey Oswald
- Mariya Prusakova (snowboarder) (born 1989), Russian snowboarder
- Nikolai Prusakov, (1900–1952), Russian poster and stage designer
