= Alexander Ilyich Naumov =

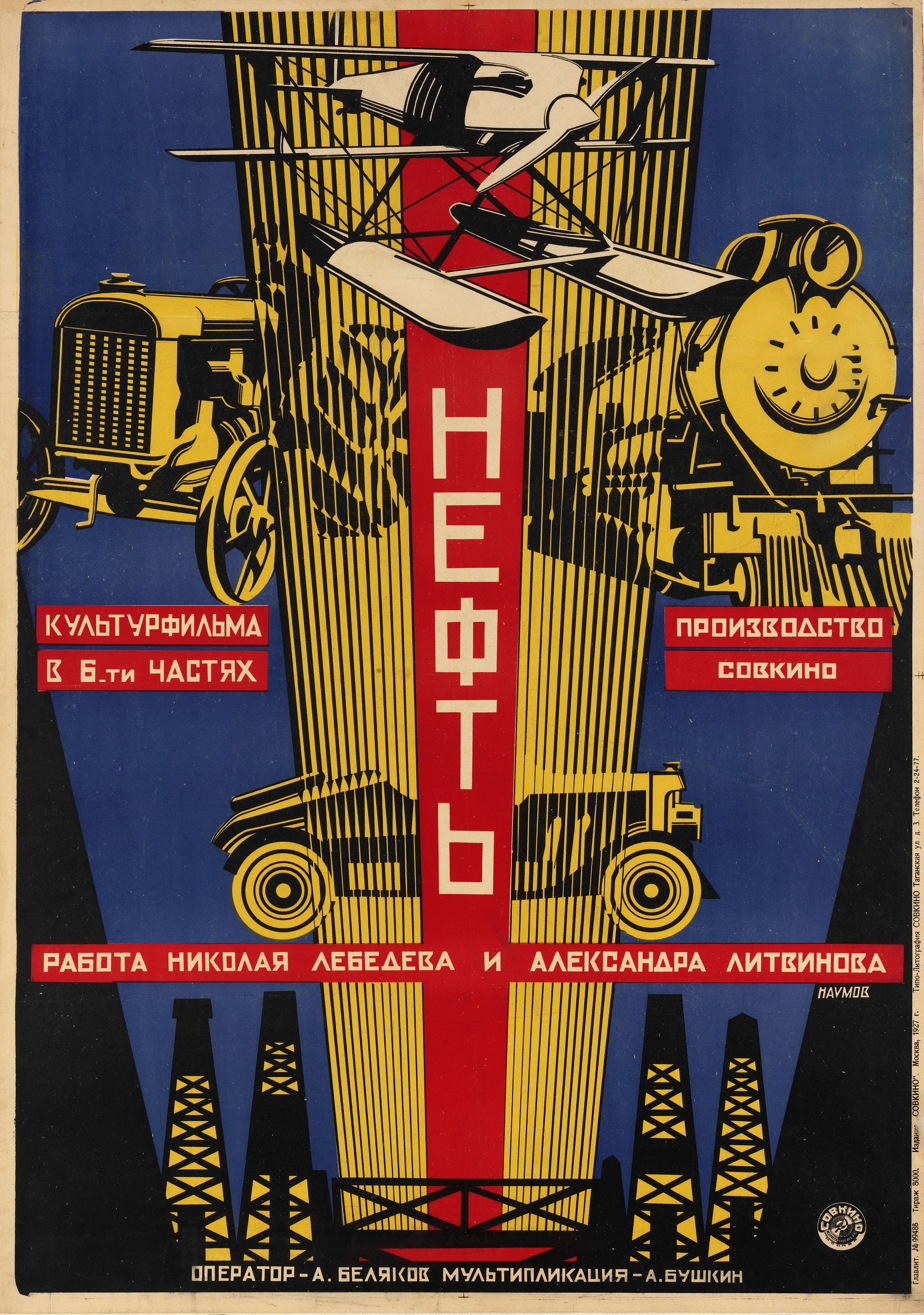
Нефть (oil)

Alexander Ilyich Naumov (1899-1928) was a Russian a painter, interior designer, book designer and poster artist who was active following the Russian Revolution.

He graduated from the Stroganov School of Arts in 1916, but then continued his studies by enrolling in another course in decorative arts.

In 1919 he was one of the main initiators of the Society of Young Artists (OBMOKhU), with whom he exhibited over the next few years.

He designed posters for a number of films including The Man on the Comet (1927).

In 1928 El Lissitzky invited him to participate in the Pressa exhibition, in Cologne. He subsequently died in a drowning accident.
