= Society of Young Artists =

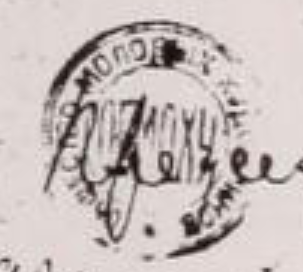
seal of ОБМОХУ, designed by Vladimir Stenberg

The Society of Young Artists (Russian: ОБМОХУ; Общество Молодых Художников) (OBMOKhU) was a collective of artists in revolutionary Russia. They experimented with spatial constructions and the properties of industrial materials. The group existed 1919 to 1922.

== History ==
Following the Russian Revolution, part education was re-organised through the establishment of svomas. The Stroganov School for Technical Drawing (later Stroganov Moscow State Academy of Arts and Industry) became the First Free State Art Workshops. However, by the summer 1919, the mass mobilisation for the Red Army currently involved in the Russian Civil War led to students graduating from the workshops joining up. However Georgiy Echeistov remained at the Workshops and joined the leaderless workshop first organised by Boris Grigoriev in September 1919.

- Grigori Aleksandrov
- Nikolai Glushkov
- Lydiia Zharova
- Petr Zhukov
- Klavdiia Kozlova
- Nikolai Menshutin
- Alexander Ilyich Naumov
- Nikolai Prusakov
- Sergei Svetlov
