= Stenberg brothers =

Soviet artists

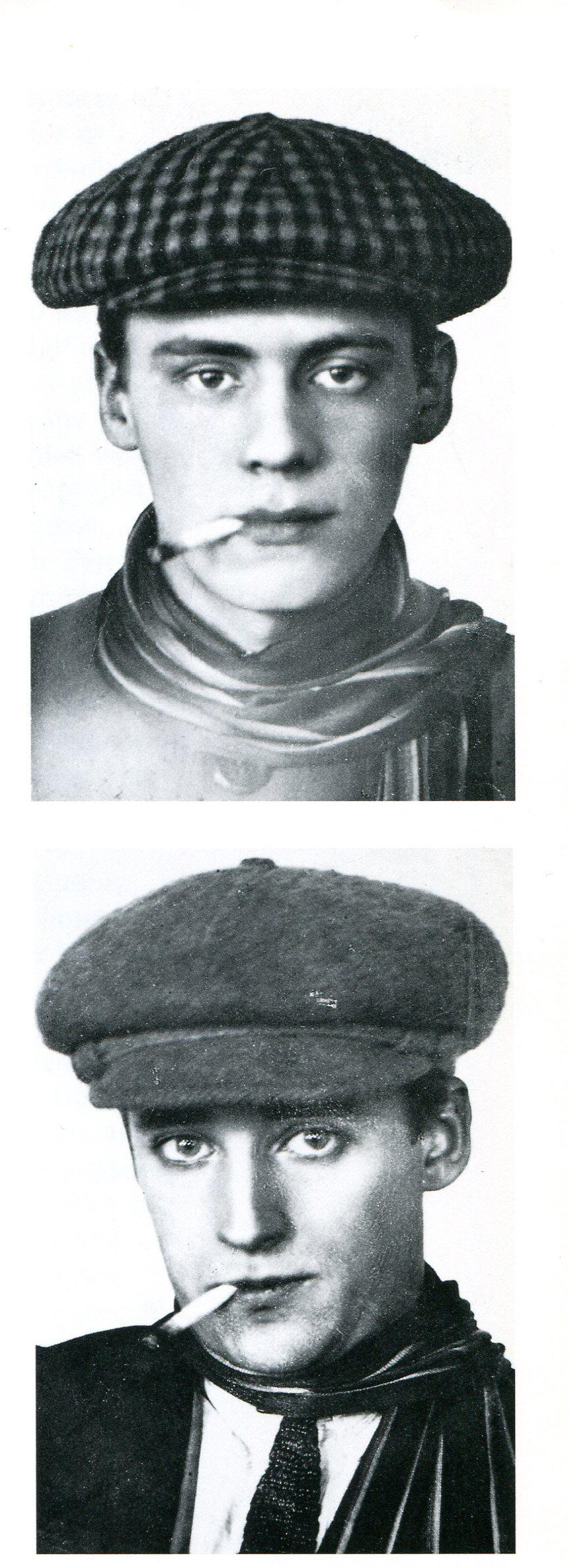
- Georgii (top) and Vladimir Stenberg
- Born: Georgii and Vladimir; Moscow
- Known for: Design work, especially film posters
- Movement: Constructivism, Productivism, Semantism, Cubism, Futurism

Vladimir Stenberg (4 April [O.S. 23 March] 1899 – May 1, 1982) and Georgii Stenberg (7 October [O.S. 24 September] 1900 – October 15, 1933) were Russian avant-garde Soviet artists and designers, best known for designing film posters for Sergei Eisenstein's movies, Dziga Vertov's documentaries and numerous imported films. The pair worked in a constructivist and, later, productivist styles, in a range of media, initially sculpture, subsequently theater design, architecture, and drafting. Their design work spanned clothing, shoes, and rail carriages, but they are most notable for their frequent use of film stills and their innovative approach to composition, which replaced traditional styles with non-narrative collage or assemblage. "Ours are eye-catching posters," Vladimir explained, "designed to shock. We deal with the material in a free manner . . . disregarding actual proportions . . . turning figures upside-down; in short, we employ everything that can make a busy passerby stop in their tracks. The inventive results included a distortion of perspective, elements from Dada photomontage, creative cropping, an exaggerated scale, a sense of movement, and a dynamic use of color and typography, all of which "created a revolutionary new art form: the film poster."

== Overview ==
The brothers were at their prime during the revolutionary period of politics and artistic experimentation in Moscow when there was a shift from the illustrator-as-creator to the constructor-as-creator or nonlinear-narrator-as-creator. In the visual language of the constructor or constructivist, the Stenbergs and other graphic designers and artists assembled images, such as portions of photographs and preprinted paper, that had been created by others. Thus, the Stenbergs and others realized wholly new images (or compositions) which were no longer about realism. As a result, graphic design as a modern expression eschewing traditional fine art was born in the form of the printed reproductions of collage or assemblage.

One of the causes of the avant-garde artists in the new Russia, who considered fine art to be useless, was served when the Stenbergs and others as constructors-as-creators produced posters that had a use, particularly to serve the state. (In fact, painter Nadezhda Udaltsova resigned from the UNKhUK in protest against the replacement of easel painting by use-intended industrial art.)

The Stenbergs' radical approach was spurred by their graphic talent, their knowledge of film theory, constructivism, Malevich's suprematism, avant-garde theater — and Bolshevik promotion of propaganda to reform the peasant class, and communicate with a widely illiterate population, which rendered commercial graphic design and advertising a desirable and honorable practice.

Radical even today, the posters by the brothers were realized within the nine-year period from 1924 to 1933, the year Georgii died at age 33. His motorcycle hit a truck, a few months after the brothers had become Russian citizens, and "around the time that Stalin came into power, Vladimir considered it to be the work of the secret police, since independent art was being attacked under Stalin’s rule."

== Biography ==
The sons of a Swedish painter and Latvian mother, both were born in Moscow, Russia but remained Swedish citizens until 1933. They first studied engineering, then attended the Stroganov School of Applied Art in Moscow, 1912–1917, and subsequently the Moscow Svomas (free studios), where they and other students designed decorations and posters for the first May Day celebration in 1918.

Their early interest in sculpture was realized in spidery and spindly structures, such as the reconstruction (1973–1974) of KPS 11: Construction of a spatial apparatus no. 11 (1919–1920) in steel, glass, paint and plaster on wood in the National Gallery of Australia Canberra. However, the arenas in which they excelled were theater, costume and graphic designs, particularly the graphic design of film posters, encouraged by the surging interest in movies in Russia and the government's sanctioning of graphic design and the cinema.

In 1919, the Stenbergs and comrades founded the OBMOKhU (Society of Young Artists) and participated in its first group exhibition in Moscow in May 1919 and in the exhibitions of 1920, 1921 and 1923. The brothers and Konstantin Medunetskii staged their own "Constructivists" exhibition in January 1922 at the Poets Café Moscow, accompanied by a Constructivist manifesto. Also that year, Vladimir showed his work in the landmark Erste Russische Kunstausstellung (First Russian Art Exhibition) held in Berlin.

In the 1920s–1930s, they were well established as members of the avant-garde in Moscow and of Moscow's INKhUK (INstitut KHUdozhestvennoy Kultury, or institute of artistic culture). Other INKhUK members included Alexander Rodchenko, Varvara Stepanova, Lyubov Popova, Medunetskii, other artists, architects, theoreticians, and art historians. INKhUK was active only 1921–1924.

Between 1922 and 1931, the Stenbergs designed sets and costumes for Alexander Tairov's Moscow Kamerny (Chamber) theatre and contributed to LEF (art journal of the left front) and to the 1925 "Exposition Internationale des Arts Décoratifs et Industriels Modernes" in Paris. 1929–32, they taught at the Architecture-Construction Institute, Moscow.

Over the course of their nine-year collaboration, the brothers produced some 300 posters despite a multitude of state obligations."In 1928, when we began to decorate Red Square, there was the October Celebration, and the May Day Celebration, then there was MYUD (International Youth Day), and Anti-War Day, on the first of August. That was a month and a half each time," Vladimir explained. "That meant four times a year, six months a year we had to devote ourselves fully and completely to that work. We did everything beginning in 1928 to 1963. For thirty-five years, I decorated Red Square. At first with my brother, then after his death with my sister, Lidiya, and then with my son beginning in 1945. In 1963, I began to lose my sight, then I had to stop.

== Exhibitions and collections ==
- "KINO/Film. Soviet Posters of the Silent Screen" 17-4a Little Portland Street London W1W 7JB, 2006.
- New York's Museum of Modern Art (MOMA): "Stenberg Brothers: Constructing a Revolution in Soviet Design," New York, a traveling exhibition, shown there initially June 10–September 2, 1997
- Art Institute of Chicago: "Revoliutsiia! Demonstratsiia! Soviet Art Put to the Test," Oct 27, 2017–Jan 15, 2018.

== Auction record ==
On May 3, 2010 Swann Galleries sold the Stenberg Brothers' poster for a run of performances by the Theatre Karmeny de Moscou in Paris in 1923 for an auction record price of $9,600. The poster is the only one by the Stenbergs ever produced for use outside of the Soviet Union.
