= Nikolai Prusakov =

Russian poster and stage designer (1900–1952)

Nikolai Prusakov (1900–1952) was a Russian poster and stage designer.

His work is kept in the Museum of Modern Art, the National Library of Russia, the University of Michigan Museum of Art, and Merrill C. Berman Collection.
