= Figurative Constructivism =

Art movement

Figurative Constructivism is an art movement that arose principally in Germany. The term was introduced by Franz Seiwert in 1929 using the phrase "gegenständlichen constructive", and this was subsequently taken up by Gerd Arntz and then by art historians more generally. It is closely related to the development of the Isotype. As Seiwert wrote "From the expressionist-cubist art-form abstract constructivism was developed, which in turn led into Figurative Constructivism".

== a bis z ==
In October 1929 Seiwert, Heinrich Hoerle and Walter Stern produced the first issue of A bis Z, subtitled "organ of the progressive artists group". It featured five artists from four towns: Seiwert and Hoerle (Cologne), Augustin Tschinkel (Prague), Peter Alma (Amsterdam) and Arntz (Vienna). Tschinkel and Alma were both colleagues of Arntz at the Gesellschafts- und Wirtschaftsmuseum run by Otto Neurath in Vienna.

== Isostat ==
The Figurative constructivist approach was adopted by Ivan Ivanitsky of Lenizogiz in Moscow.

== See also ==
- Figurative art
- Figurative construction
