= IZOSTAT =

IZOSTAT (Note: Russian: ИЗОСТАТ; from Russian Всесоюзный институт изобразительной статистики советского строительства и хозяйства; lit. 'All-union Institute of Pictorial Statistics of Soviet Construction and Economy') was an agency of the Soviet government that designed, created, published, and distributed graphic representations of Soviet industry that were easily understandable without written explanations. Founded as an educational unit, Izostat evolved into a producer of propaganda. It operated between 1931 and 1940.

== Origins in Vienna ==
In Red Vienna of the 1920s under the Social Democratic Party of Austria, philosopher and logician of the Vienna Circle, Otto Neurath, founded a new museum for housing and city planning called Siedlungsmuseum, renamed in 1925 the Gesellschafts- und Wirtschaftsmuseum in Wien (Museum of Society and Economy in Vienna). To make the museum's displays widely understandable for visitors from all around the polyglot Austro-Hungarian Empire, Neurath worked on graphic design and visual education, believing that "Words divide, pictures unite," a coinage of his own that he displayed on the wall of his office there. In the late 1920s, his assistant, graphic designer and communications theorist Rudolf Modley, contributed to a new means of communication: a visual "language." With the illustrator Gerd Arntz and with Marie Reidemeister, Neurath's team developed novel ways of representing quantitative information via easily interpretable icons. The forerunner of contemporary Infographics, he initially called this the Vienna Method of Pictorial Statistics. As his ambitions for the project expanded beyond social and economic data related to Vienna, he renamed the project "Isotype," an acronymic nickname for the project's full title: International System of Typographic Picture Education. At international conventions of city planners, Neurath presented and promoted his communication tools.

Neurath's methods made such an impact on a delegation from the Soviet Embassy, another government with a polyglot population, the Soviet government in Moscow invited Neurath and Reidemeister to assist with the creation of an educational institution based on the same principles.

== Establishment ==
Neurath and Reidemeister accepted the invitation, and Neurath committed to spending sixty days each year in the Soviet Union to assist started in 1931. The institute was located in 9 Bol'shoi Komsomol'sky pereulok. Neurath's colleagues Gerd Arntz and Peter Alma also spent time working at IZOSTAT between 1931 and 1934. In 1932 Izostat published a monograph about its methods in Pictorial statistics and the Vienna Method (Изобразительная статистика и венский метод) by Ivan Petrovich Ivanitsky.

== Output ==
With a staff that eventually grew to seventy, Izostat's main goal was to develop infographics that communicated both the successes of the First five-year plan (1928–1932), especially in the development of coal, iron, steel, and electricity, and predictions of the anticipated successes of the Second five-year plan in roads, railways, and waterways. Izostat’s output was not limited to news, but created a wide variety of materials including charts, books, window displays, and materials for Soviet holidays and celebrations.

Some Izostat materials were also produced for an overseas audience. English-language publications such as The Struggle for Five Years in Four and The Second Five-Year Plan in Construction were printed and distributed to Communist Party or trade union officials in the anglophone world. Survey Graphic, an American journal reproduced a number of Izostat charts originally created for Izvestia. The agency’s most notable English-language project was an album produced for the 1939 New York World's Fair and overseen by the Russian avant-garde suprematist artist El Lissitzky. Titled USSR: An Album Illustrating the State Organization and National Economy of the USSR, it combined Izostat charts, photographs of notable Soviet figures and events, and woodcut socialist realist scenes portraying Soviet life in a positive light.

As Neurath perceived Izostat's mission stray from education, he grew disillusioned with Izostat and ended his collaboration in 1934. By the late 1930s, the agency's mission had shifted to propaganda and agitation.

== Dissolution ==
The organization continued to operate until 1940, when it was shut down.
