= Augustin Tschinkel =

Czech artist

Augustin Tschinkel (1905, Prague – 1983, Cologne) was a Czech artist active with the Figurative Constructivist art movement.

Tschinkel went to Cologne, Germany to attend the Pressa exhibition there. He was working with Ladislav Sutnar who was responsible for the Czech pavilion there. While in Cologne, he took the opportunity to meet with Franz Seiwert, who he was generally familiar with from reading left-wing art/politics journal Die Aktion to which Seiwert contributed both images and theoretical articles. He joined the Cologne Progressives, the art group that Seiwert had founded. He adopted their method of black and white images which were easy to mass-produce for leaflets and posters which they distributed to a largely working-class audience with little consideration for official constraints on where they put their posters. These they called "social graphics" and Tschinkel became the sole proponent of this artistic form in Czechoslovakia. In 1929 Augustin followed fellow member Gerd Arntz to Vienna to work for the Gesellschafts- und Wirtschaftsmuseum. He was also accompanied by Peter Alma. Here, he became involved in the development of the Vienna Method, which emerged thanks to the combination of Otto Neurath's approach to visual education and the approach of the Figurative Constructivists.

The Gesellschafts- und Wirtschaftsmuseum was suppressed by the Austro-fascists following their defeat of the Schutzbund in the Austrian Civil War in February 1934. Tschinkel returned to Czechoslovakia and was employed as a graphic consultant for the state publishing house. Here he applied the Vienna method to the production of educational and statistical material. He also linked up with Sutnar again.

During the 1950s, he maintained correspondence with Raoul Hausmann.
