= Peter Alma =

Figurative constructivist painter

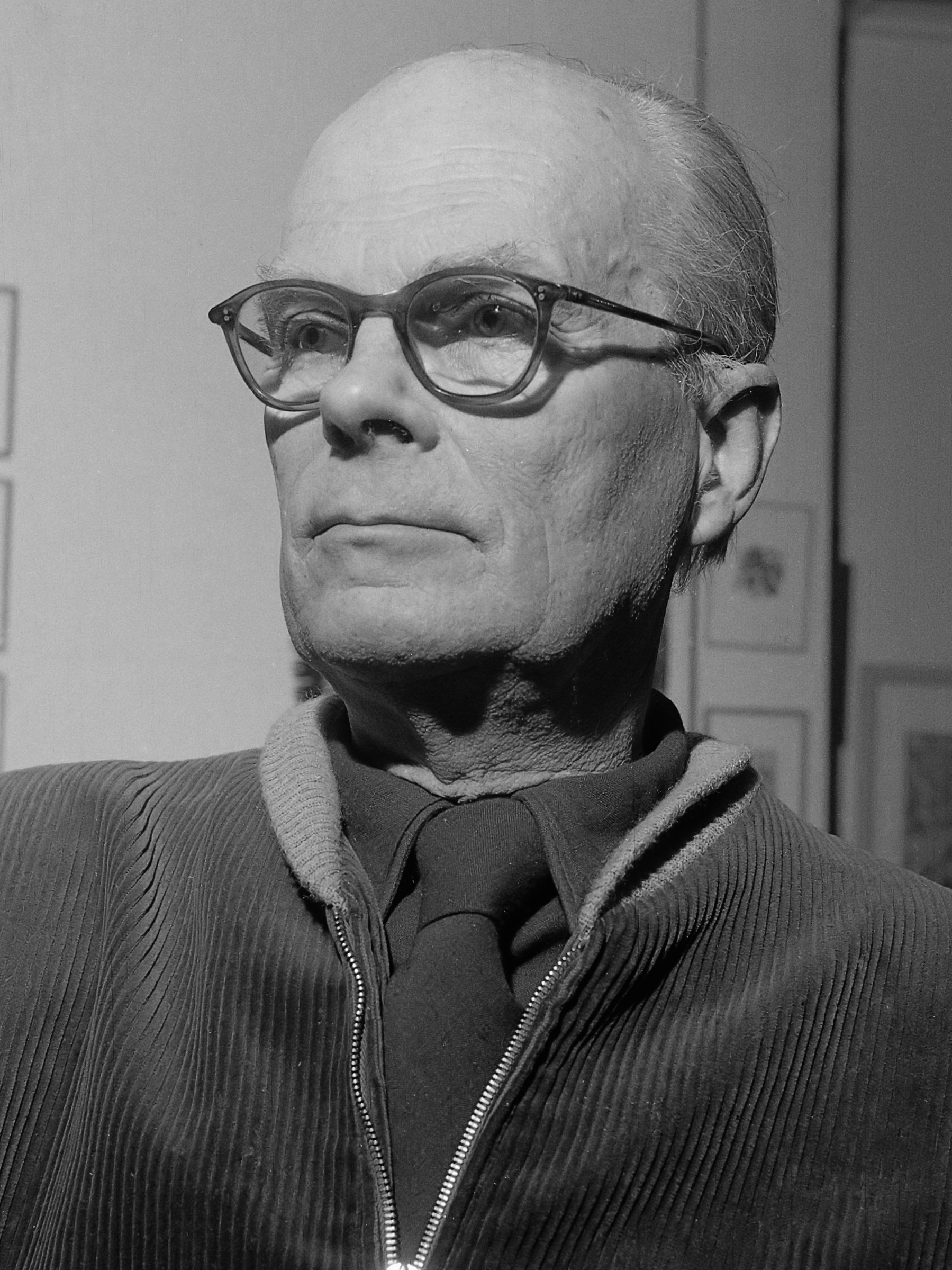
- Born: 18 January 1886; Medan, Indonesia
- Died: 23 May 1969 (aged 83); Amsterdam
- Occupation: Painter

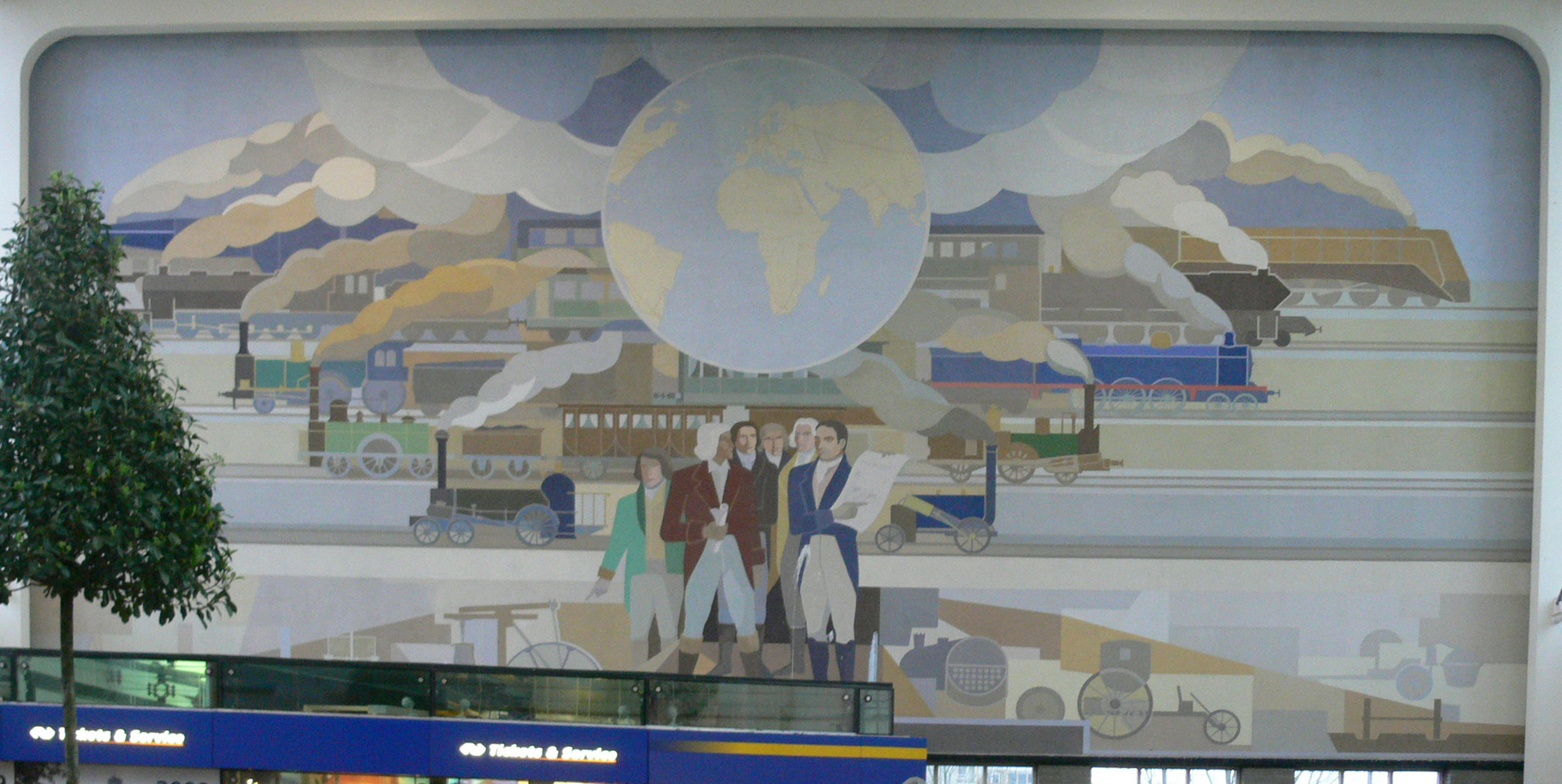
Mural at Amsterdam Amstel railway station by Peter Alma (1939).

Peter Alma (18 January 1886 Medan – 23 May 1969 Amsterdam) was a Dutch artist. Alma was born in Medan, Indonesia, and attended the Royal Academy of Art, The Hague, in 1904. On the recommendation of Franz Seiwert, he was employed by the Gesellschafts- und Wirtschaftsmuseum, working with Gerd Arntz and Augustin Tschinkel on developing isotypes. He travelled to Moscow with Arntz and Otto Neurath to work at IZOSTAT to help them draw up pictorial images for statistics of the Five Year Plans. Alma was a member of Nederlandsche Vereeniging voor Ambachts- en Nijverheidskunst (V.A.N.K.) the Dutch Association for Craft and Craft Art. He painted several large murals in and around Amsterdam in the 1930s.

== Works ==
=== Murals ===
A 1939 mural celebrating rail transportation covers the interior wall of one Amsterdam Amstel railway station.

A signed, undated mural of six men with machinery and tools stands in the stairwell of Stadhouderskade 68, Amsterdam (currently Hotel Aston City). The figures bear a range of skin tones, from brown to buff, indicating interracial inclusion.

=== Amsterdam Museum ===
The Amsterdam Museum keeps a number of his works in their depot:

- Pottenbakker
- Another work
- Another work
- Another work
- Another work
- Another work
- Another work
