= Ivan Ivanitsky =

Soviet graphic designer and infographics pioneer

Ivan Petrovich Ivanitsky (1896–1970) was a Soviet graphic designer and infographics pioneer.

Ivanitsky was drafted into the Russian Imperial Army in 1915. He was wounded during the war receiving a wound in his right hand. For the rest of his life he was left-handed. By 1920 he had settled in Saint Petersburg where he worked for the publishing house Начатки знаний (Beginnings of Knowledge), a cultural and educational partnership that produced educational material concerning the natural sciences and children's literature. Here he worked on graphical charts and desktop games.

In 1930 he started work with Ленизогиза (Lenizogiz), where he headed the department dealing with graphical statistics, and was responsible for the preparation and processing of graphic material. In this role he was assisted by Otto Neurath who served as his art director.

In 1931 he published Догнать и перегнать в техникоэкономическом отношении передовые капиталистические страны в 10 лет (Catch up and overtake technically and economically advanced capitalist countries in 10 years) where he provided a theoretical elaboration of own method of graphical statistics. In November 1931 he was seconded to IZOSTAT where he studied the graphic methods of the Vienna Method. In 1932 he published Изобразительная статистика и венский метод (Figurative Statistics and the Vienna Method), where he attempts to develop a new approach to isostatistics, which involved using linear strip charts to be compared in length. He also explained how the vienna method was based on figurative techniques developed by Willard C. Brinton in the US and how he proposed that IZOSTAT would develop these methods further.
