= Hans Kampffmeyer (1876–1932) =

Hans Kampffmeyer (30 January 1876 in Naumburg – 28 May 1932 in Frankfurt am Main) was a German activist in the Garden city movement.

Hans Kampffmeyer was head of the Austrian Association for Settlements and Small Gardens from 1919 to 1920. He was then appointed as a consultant to the Vienna city authorities working at the municipal Siedlungsamt together with Adolf Loos. In 1920 he launched the journal Der Siedler with Otto Neurath. This journal had a circulation of 40,000 and between 1920 and 1922 it played a key role in coordinating the settlers movement.

Kampffmeyer considered that in Austria the garden element of the movement was the most important in that lack of food rather than lack of housing was the most pressing problem.

In 1925 Kampffmeyer worked with VOKS, the All-Union Society for Cultural Relations with Foreign Countries of the Soviet Union to set up the Österreichischen Gesellschaft zur Förderung der geistigen und wirstschafftlichen Beziehenungen mit der UdSSR.
