= Hans Kampffmeyer =

Hans Kampffmeyer may refer to:

- Hans Kampffmeyer (1876–1932), activist with Garden City Movement
- Hans Kampffmeyer (1912–1996), Social Democratic town planner
