= Ladislav Sutnar =

Czech graphic designer (1897–1976)

- Sutnar in 1934
- Born: 9 November 1897; Plzeň, Bohemia, Austria-Hungary
- Died: 13 November 1976 (aged 79); New York, New York, United States
- Occupations: Designer, artist, art director, educator
- Known for: Information graphics, modern design, adding parentheses around American area codes
- Awards: AIGA medalist, 1979 Art Directors Club Hall of Fame

Ladislav Sutnar (9 November 1897 – 13 November 1976) was a Czech graphic designer. He was a pioneer of information design and information architecture. Although he is uncredited, his contributions to business organization benefited society, which included creating a user-friendly telephone directory by implementing parenthetical area codes. He received design commissions from a variety of employers, including McGraw-Hill, IBM, and the United Nations. He also worked as art director for Sweet's Catalog Service for almost twenty years. Sutnar held many one-man exhibitions, and his work is on permanent display in MoMA. He is best known for his books, including Controlled Visual Flow: Shape, Line and Color, Package Design: The Force of Visual Selling, and Visual Design in Action: Principles, Purposes. Sutnar was a master of exhibition design, typography, advertising, posters, magazine and book design.

== Life ==
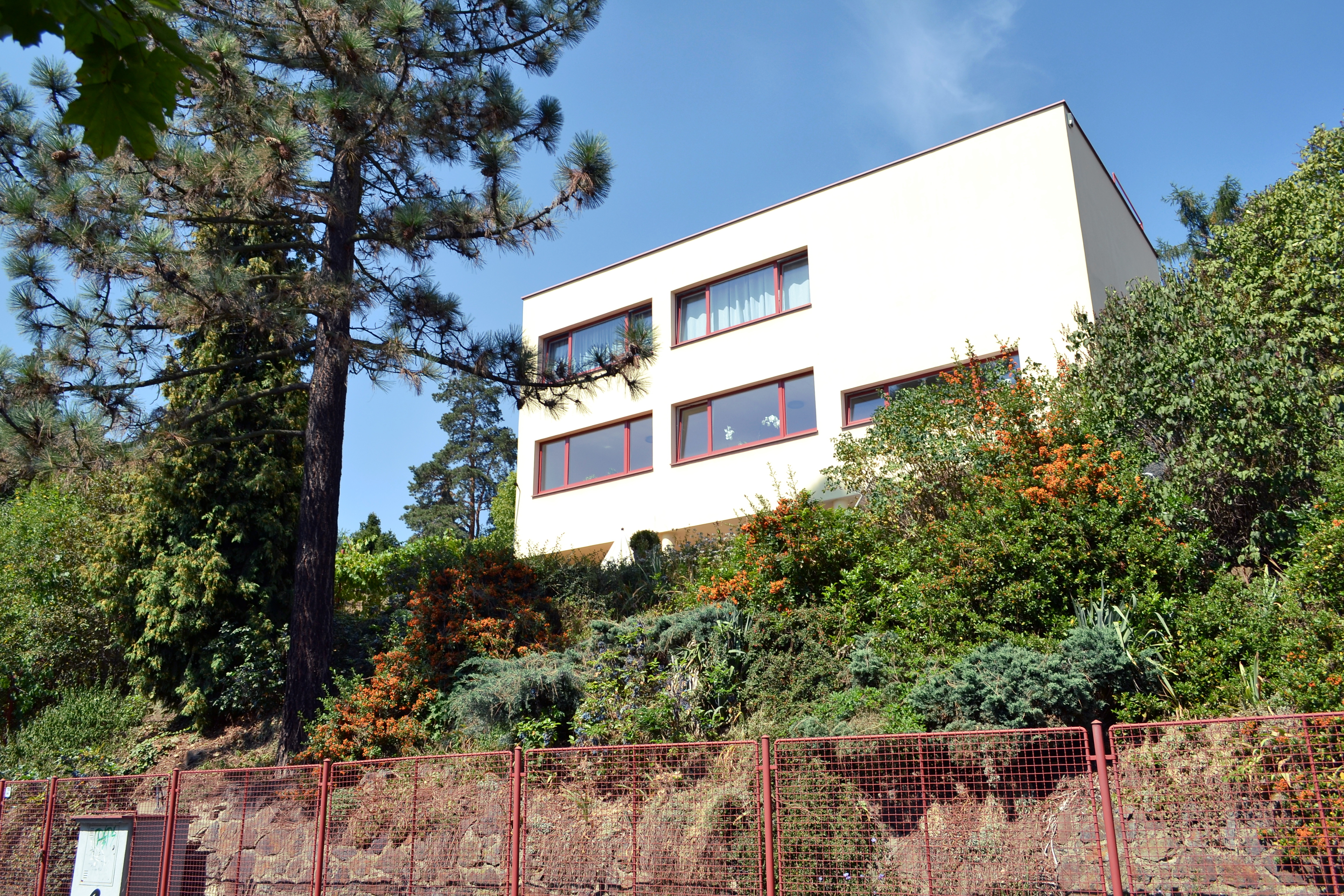
Sutnar's villa in Prague

Sutnar was born on 9 November 1897 in Plzeň, Bohemia. He studied painting at the School of Applied Arts in Prague, architecture at Charles University, and mathematics at the Czech Technical University. Post graduation, Sutnar worked on wooden toys, puppets, costumes, and stage design. Also, he contributed to exhibition design as well as teaching and the design of magazines, books, porcelain products and textiles. He taught at the State School of Graphic Arts, Prague, from 1923 to 1936. In Europe, he gained recognition for typography and exhibition design.

While still in Prague, Sutnar was an Artel Cooperative member. Other designers for Artel included Vlastislav Hofman and Rudolf Stockar. The Artel Cooperative consisted of designers from Czechoslovakia who crafted furniture and held workshops under the Wiener Werkstätte's principles of art accessibility. Medium included ceramics, textiles, carpets, furniture, and metal aiming to visually improve the experiences of daily life. The organization came to an end in 1924.

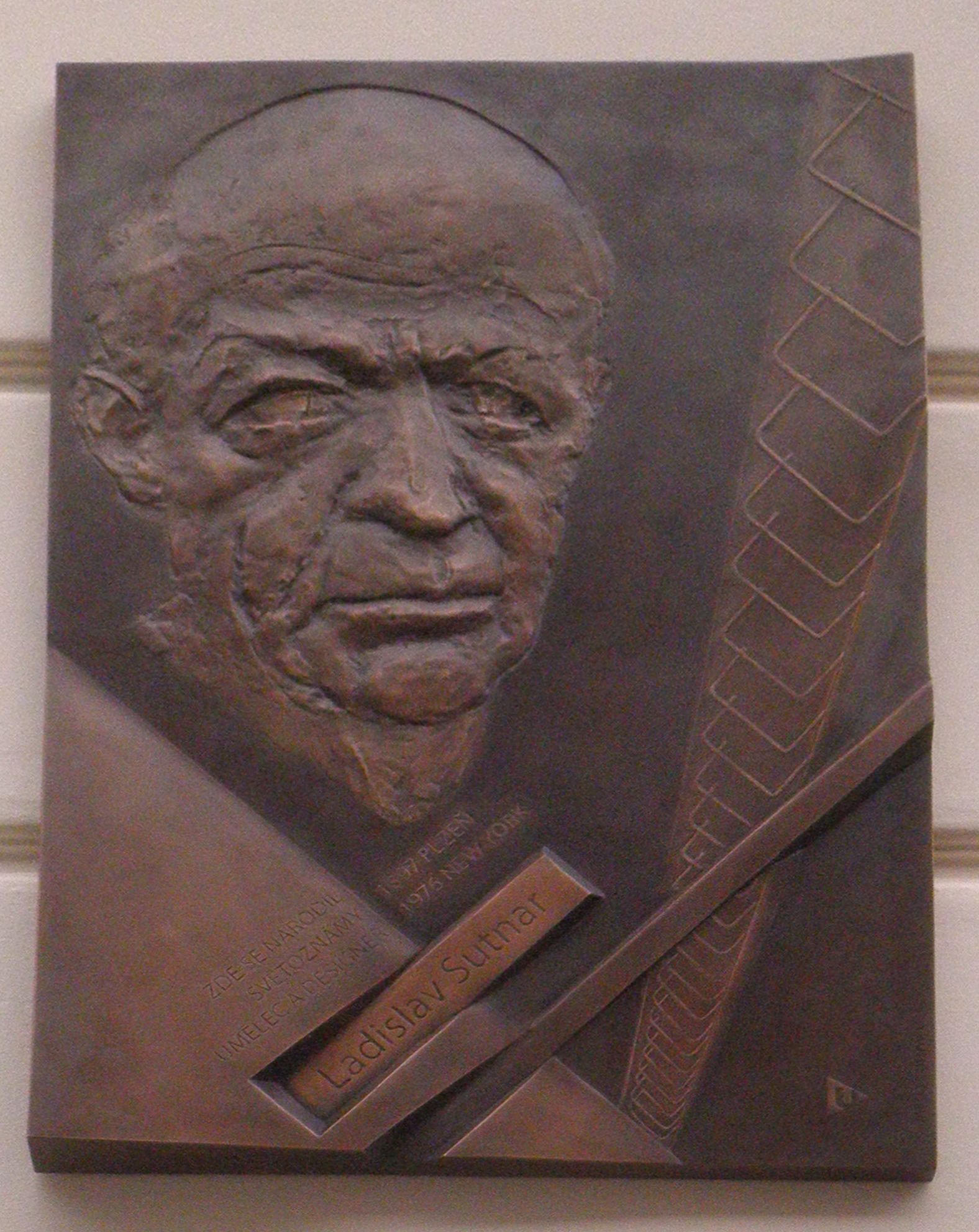
Memorial plaque to Sutnar on his birthhouse in Plzeň

In 1927, Sutnar became the head of publication design for a large publisher in Prague. Then in 1928 he went to the Pressa international exhibition, taking responsibility for the Czech pavilion there. He was accompanied by Augustin Tschinkel. He was made director of the State School of Graphic Arts beginning in 1932. Sutnar continued his work in exhibition design and received a gold medal at the 1929 Barcelona Exhibition. Sutnar was also an art director of a book publisher and editor of an architectural magazine.

Sutnar was brought to the United States to design the exhibition for Czechoslovakia at the New York World Fair in 1939. Due to its cancellation, he chose to settle in New York leaving his family behind in Prague as Nazi control continued there.

In 1941, he became art director of F.W. Dodge's Sweet's Catalog Service from 1941 until 1960 where he led the development of information design along with Knud Lonberg-Holm. The company produced and distributed trade and manufacturing catalogues. Sutnar implemented both typographic and iconographic characters that enabled viewers to quickly and successfully navigate through an overwhelming amount of information. He did this by making use of grids, tabs, icons, and symbols. Sutnar and Holm published New Patterns in Product Information in 1944. Their reductive approach aimed for clarity and simplicity for all users with "active design elements".

At the same time, he added punctuation into traffic signs in the United States. He continued his typographic design for advertising and corporations as he was art director for Theatre Arts magazine for ten years. He also created trends in glassware and flatware products.

== Information graphics ==
Sutnar was not credited for the implementation of parentheses around the American area code for Bell System (late 1950s–early 1960s). This addition allowed much easier access to normal and emergency services. The reason for lack of credit lies in the fact that Bell System considered "graphic designers as transparent as the function graphics they designed." Sutnar used parentheses in his own work to highlight and distinguish information. Sutnar himself said that the absence of these organizational methods and simplified legibility makes everyday activities much more difficult to accomplish. Graphic design was responding to the growing pace of information standards and the need to communicate faster.

Sutnar was one of the first designers to actively practice in the field of information design. His work was based on rationality and the process of displaying massive amounts of information in a concise and organized way to benefit the general viewer. Typography and a limited color palette was stressed in his work. He often used punctuation symbols to help organize information, but his signature creation was the idea to place parentheses around the area codes in telephone books. While serving as art director for Sweet's Catalog Services, he created information graphics and catalog layouts for a wide range of manufactured items. He was heavily influenced by the ideas of Modernism and his work was well structured.

=== Styles and design ===
Borrowing from the principles of De Stijl, Sutnar's work had a reduction to primary colors, straight lines, and an overall harmony of irregular text alignment. His strong use of diagonal elements, typography and imagery more strongly conveys his design style to be classified as Constructivism. Space is divided into white and black areas and consist of elements with symbolism. Similar to Jan Tschichold's work and modern typography, his style was limited to type and color within strict layouts. More strongly, his work connected with the Bauhaus fundamentals. His work is simple but suggests motion with vivid colors and directional patterns.

- Book design
  - Sutnar designed the book jacket for George Bernard Shaw's Obraceni Kapitana Brassbounda in 1932.
  - Sutnar's cover of Nejmenší dům (The Smallest House) uses only the colors black, white and red and a diagonal title.
- Poster design
  - Visit the Modern Textile Exhibition (1930) demonstrated the "ability of written characters to focus attention without the help of a pictorial image" with a rectangular arrangement and different text sizes based on a hierarchy of information.
- Toy design
  - Starting in 1924, Sutnar designed toys consisting of simple geometric structures of animals and puppets. He attempted to introduce modern aesthetics into children's toys by developing a building kit that consisted of sawtooth roofs, cones, and pieces in the colors of red, blue, and white (this remained a prototype). He also wrote a children's book on the future of traffic in Transport: Next Half Century. Sutnar created art-oriented toys, i.e. "Apisonadora" (construction vehicle).

=== Strip Street ===
The 1960s proved to be a difficult time for the designer as he turned to publishing Strip Street (1963). It was an album of 12 erotic silk-screen prints. Sutnar organized two New York gallery exhibitions of his nudes, In Pursuit of Venus (1966) and Venus: Joy-Art (1969). These works outside of his norm still included Sutnar's hierarchical design approach as a father of modern information design. The term "posters without words" refers to Sutnar's distinct poster-like design that characterizes the individual prints of this series. Sutnar's paintings are reproduced in a 392-page monograph.

His racy Strip Street compilation has been relatively forgotten. He wrote an essay to accompany these works. "In these disturbed times of cool and alienated society," he wrote, "if the paintings can inject the feeling, the mission is accomplished." An influence of pop is notable despite Sutnar's dislike of pop and pop art.

== Published books ==
- Catalog Design was a handbook by Sutnar in 1944 for trade catalogs using constructivist principles.
- Catalog Design Progress by Sutnar and Holm solved sales and advertising problems by focusing on product information and "living standards" of all forms of information design. It was based on the idea that logical compositions would enable quick access to common information. Composed of four parts, it begins with patterns influenced by industrialization, such as street patterns and transportation. Part two features visual features of design, typography, pictures, charts, and covers. Color, shape, and size are used as tools to direct eye movement. Part three directs structural or layout features, i.e., page, catalog, and file organization. The last part is devoted to fundamental design principles: form and flow.
- Design for Point of Sale (1952) was a survey of contemporary methods of in-store display.
- Package Design: the Force of Visual Selling (1953)
- Visual Design in Action (1961) argues for future advances in graphic design and defines design. This Modern design book has been compared to Tschichold's Die Neue Typographie. It was an exhibition of his work and a self-funded book.

== Influence and legacy ==
Although well after his time, Sutnar's methods of conveying information in a manner that evoked attention can be linked to the navigational aids of web design.

The Ladislav Sutnar Faculty of Design and Art, part of the University of West Bohemia and located in the designer's birthplace of Plzeň, was named in his honor on 1 April 2014.
