= Hildegard Joos =

Austrian painter (1909–2005)

Hildegard Joos (7 May 1909 in Sieghartskirchen, Lower Austria – 17 January 2005 in Vienna) was an Austrian painter and is known as the "Grande Dame" of geometric abstraction and constructivism in Austria.

== Life ==
Hildegard Joos spent her childhood in Lower Austria. After the Second World War, she studied at the Academy of Fine Arts in Vienna.

In 1955, she became a member of the Vienna Secession and, in 1958, was the first female artist whose work was presented in a solo exhibition in the main room of the Vienna Secession. Three other individual exhibitions took place there in 1964, 1967 and 1980. From 1959 onwards, together with her husband Harold Joos, Hildegard Joos had a studio in Paris. There she achieved great recognition with her monistic paintings. She participated in the international development of geometric abstraction and in numerous exhibitions such as the "Salon des Indépendants" and the "Salon des Réalités Nouvelles". She was coined by the Paris Salon of Réalités Nouvelles since she became a member there in 1972.

Joos was referred to as the "Grande Dame" of abstract painting in Austria. Checkerboard and raster images were an important part of her artistic work. Her first works, on the other hand, were figurative, colorful and expressive.

Initially, the artist couple signed their collaborations with "Hildegard Joos", and from 1980 with "H + H Joos".

Hildegard Joos died in Vienna in 2005, aged 95 years old.

In 2014, Viennese gallerist and art dealer Martin Suppan organized a retrospective of Hildegard Joos in the Vienna Künstlerhaus with more than 140 works on display.

== Solo exhibitions (selection) ==
- 1958 First Solo Exhibition in the Vienna Secession
- 1960 Wiener Konzerthaus
- 1961 Junge Generation Wien
- 1962 Hildegard Joos, Main room of the Vienna Secession
- 1964 Hildegard Joos, Main room of the Vienna Secession
- 1965 Galerie Jeunes, Paris
- 1966 Hildegard Joos Oeuvres récentes. Peintures-Gouaches, Amsterdam, Prinzengracht, Anne Frank Stichting
- 1967 Hildegard Joos, Oil Paintings, Gallery of the Vienna Secession
- 1968 Palazzo Artelli, Triest
- 1969 Brücke, Bielefeld
- 1971 C. R. D. P Orleans, Frankreich
- 1972 Galerie Stubenbastei Vienna
- 1975 Galerie Grohmann Munich
- 1978 Galerie Modern Art Vienna
- 1980 Hildegard Joos, Painting and Graphic 1959–1979, Main room of the Vienna Secession
- 1984 Hildegard & Harold Joos, MUMOK Museum Vienna
- 1984 Monochrome Bilder der 60er Jahre, Schloss Buchberg am Kamp, NÖ
- 1989 Hildegard & Harold Joos, Narrative Geometrismen, Museum moderner Kunst Linz
- 1994 H + H Joos, Narrative Geometrismen, Raumnarrative Bilder und Colour Field 1990–1993, NÖ Landesmuseum
- 1996 H + H Joos, Serie Rot-Blau, Internationales Kulturzentrum Egon Schiele, Krumau
- 1997 H + H Joos, Von den Anfängen bis heute, Österreichische Galerie Belvedere
- 2005 „In Memorian Hildegard Joos“ Österreichische Galerie Belvedere
- 2014 Hildegard Joos Retrospektive im Künstlerhaus Wien, Suppan Fine Arts
- 2015 H+H Joos, abstrakt • konstruktiv • narrativ, ɑrbeiten auf papier 1952 and 2000, Suppan Fine Arts
- 2017 H+H Joos, works on paper, Suppan Fine Arts

== Public collections (selection) ==
- Galerie Belvedere, Wien
- Niederösterreichisches Landesmuseum, St. Pölten
- MUMOK, Wien
- Albertina Museum, Wien
- Lentos Museum, Linz
- Museum Liaunig, Neuhaus
- Artothek des Bundes, Wien
- NÖ Landesmuseum, St.Pölten

== Awards ==
- 1987: Preis der Stadt Wien für Bildende Kunst
