= Marie Neurath =

German designer and author (1898-1986)

- Born: Marie Reidemeister; 27 May 1898; Braunschweig, German Empire
- Died: 10 October 1986 (aged 88); London, England
- Occupation: Designer
- Relatives: Mathematician Kurt Reidemeister (brother)

Marie Neurath, born Marie Reidemeister (27 May 1898 – 10 October 1986), was a German designer, social scientist and author. Neurath was a member of the team that developed a simplified pictographic language, the Vienna Method of Pictorial Statistics (Wiener Methode der Bildstatistik), which she later renamed Isotype. She was also a prolific writer and designer of educational books for younger readers.

== Biography ==
Marie Reidemeister was born in Braunschweig, Germany on 27 May 1898. Reidemeister studied mathematics and physics from 1917 to 1924 in Göttingen, Germany, while also taking courses at the "Kunstschule" (art school) in 1919. Just before graduating she met Otto Neurath and soon moved to Vienna. In 1925 she began work at the Gesellschafts- und Wirtschaftsmuseum in Wien (Social and Economic Museum of Vienna). The museum was founded to communicate the city's social reform programme to the public. This was the start of her long activity as the main "transformer" (in English, one would now say designer or science communicator) working with Otto Neurath in the teams that made graphic displays of social information, an early form of information design known as the Vienna Method.

The other essential member of the Neurath group, the German artist Gerd Arntz, joined in 1928. Marie Reidemeister worked at this museum in Vienna until the brief civil war in Austria in 1934, moving then with Neurath (a prominent Social Democrat) and Arntz (who had allegiances to radical-left groups) to The Hague.

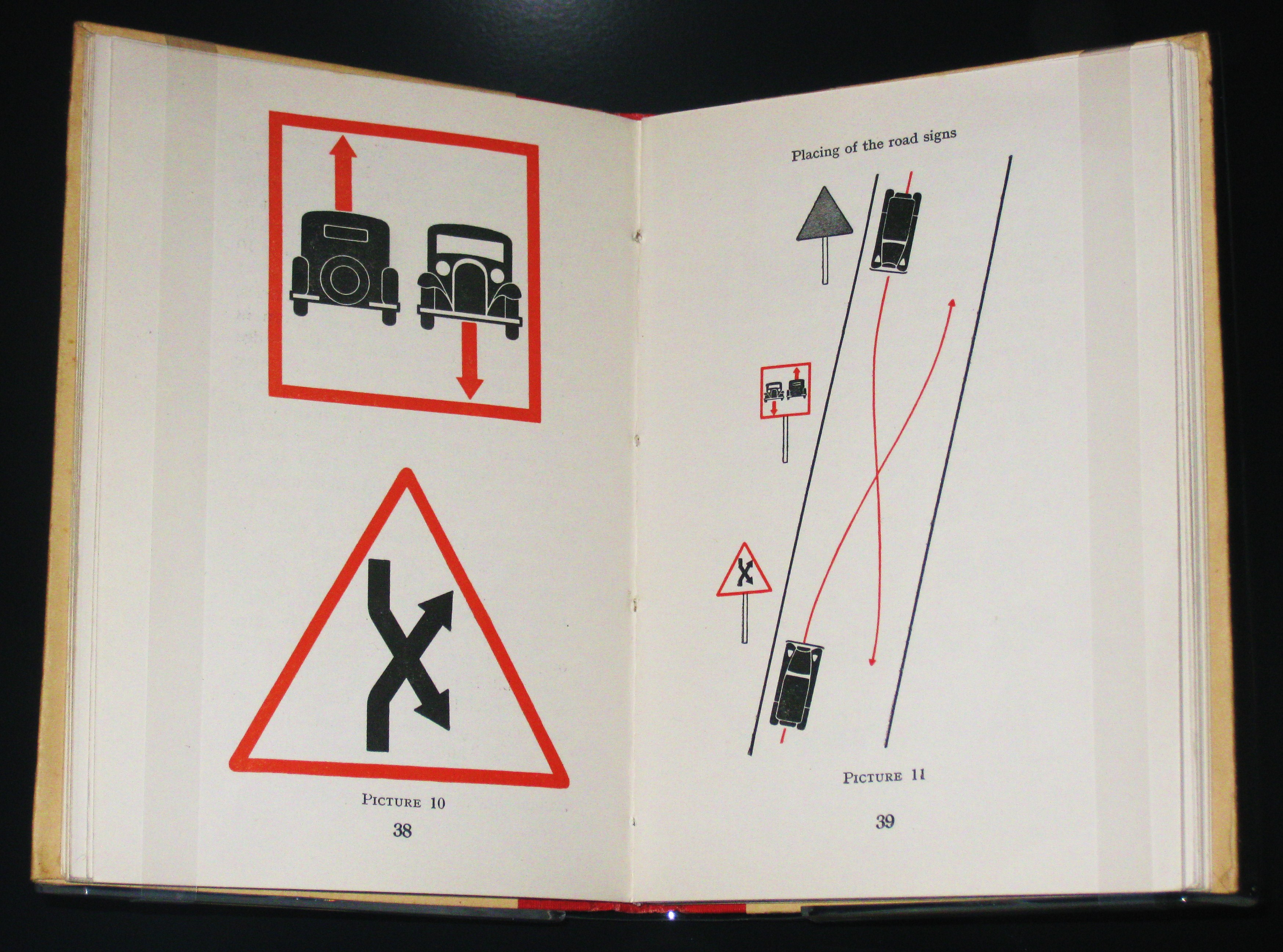
An ISOTYPE book on display at the Victoria and Albert Museum, London.

A new name was needed for the Vienna Method now that its original context was left behind: Marie Neurath developed the acronym Isotype (International System of Typographic Picture Education) in 1935 on the analogy of Charles Kay Ogden's "Basic English". It was intended as a method of pictorial statistics that could clarify scientific relationships for non specialists. Large data volumes were translated in a comprehensible and memorable visual form. The data was illustrated and interconnections were to be presented, the result was a promoted democratisation of knowledge. Neurath collected the information, Arntz developed the pictograms and graphics and Reidemeister converted the information and data into a visual understandable presentation. She linked technical experts and graphic designers as well as the target audience. Otto Neurath called this position the "trustee of the public".

In 1940, as the German army invaded the Netherlands, Reidemeister escaped with Neurath to England, while Arntz stayed behind in The Hague. In 1941, after release from internment (as "enemy aliens"), Marie and Otto Neurath were married, and resumed their work in Oxford, founding the Isotype Institute. The Isotype Institute produced more than 80 illustrated children’s books, half are dedicated to science education. After Otto Neurath’s death in 1945, Marie Neurath carried on the work with a small number of English assistants, moving to London in 1948.

== With ISOTYPE in West Africa ==
In August 1953 Obafemi Awolowo visited London to attend a constitutional conference organised by the British Government. The conference was concerned with discussions concerning the Lyttleton Constitution. While in London, Awolowo arranged to meet Marie Neurath in relation to a proposed contract for educational material to help voters in Western Region, Nigeria better understand the proposed form of governance.

== Retirement ==
After her retirement in 1971, she gave the working material of the Isotype Institute to the University of Reading, where it is housed in the Department of Typography & Graphic Communication as the Otto and Marie Neurath Isotype Collection. Thereafter she devoted much energy to establishing a record of Otto Neurath’s life and work, and editing and translating his writings. She died in London in 1986.
