= Rudolf Modley =

Austrian-American executive and graphic designer

Rudolf Modley

Rudolf Modley (November 3, 1906 – September 28, 1976) was an Austrian-American research executive, graphic designer, management consultant and author, who founded Pictorial Statistics Inc. in 1934. He illustrated and wrote a series of books on pictorial statistics and pictorial symbolism.

Modley introduced and popularized the Isotype picture language in the United States, whereby he developed an own version of pictorial statistics. He also designed many pictorial symbols in the 1930s and 1940s, and worked on standardization of pictorial symbols.

== Biography ==
=== Youth and studies ===
Modley was born in 1906 in Vienna, then the capital of the Austro-Hungarian Empire, to Alfred and Elsa (Hoffmann) Moddley. After regular education and high school, he studied at the University of Vienna, where he obtained his Doctor of Law degree in 1929. During his studies in Vienna Modley had been assistant to Otto Neurath in the Social Museum, which Neurath had founded in 1923 and directed ever since. Modley had got acquainted with Otto Neurath’s design philosophy, while still at high school, and since those days he had worked as volunteer for Neurath. In 1928 he got a part-time appointment as a staff member and instructor for foreign visitors at the museum.

=== Early career in the U.S. ===
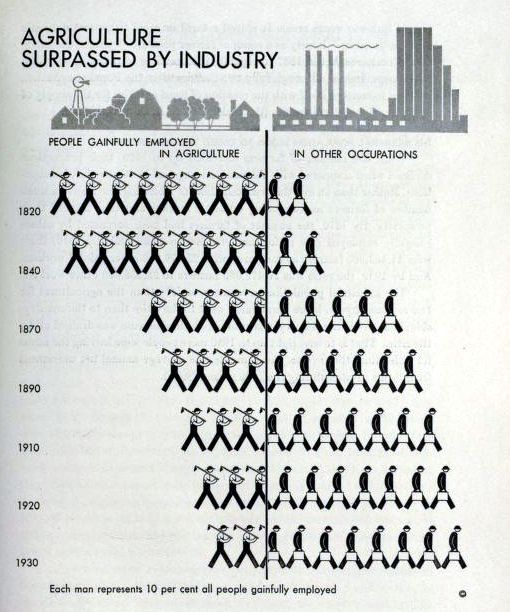
Infographic on agriculture surpassed by Industry by Modley, 1938

In 1930 Modley came to the United States to do postgraduate work at the University of Chicago. Recommended by Neurath, he was appointed curator of Social Science at the Museum of Science and Industry in Chicago by Waldemar Kaempffert, a cousin of Neurath. By the end of 1931 Modley had to go back to Austria to obtain a permanent resident status, and returned in 1932.

In 1933 Modley had moved to New York, where he in 1934 he founded Pictorial Statistics Incorporated. The company promoted the production and distribution of ISOTYPE-like pictographs for education, news, and other forms of communications. The company was set up as "a non-profit organization that offered to draw charts, including Isotypes, for any editor or publisher interested in illustrating economic and social articles." Pictorial Statistics Inc. followed an independent course from Otto Neurath, who had set up an own institute, the Institute for Visual Education, to promote his ideas in the U.S. Modley also started working as consultant for several government agencies.

=== Later career in the U.S. ===
In the mid-1960s, Modley joined forces with cultural anthropologist Margaret Mead, jointly establishing an organization called Glyphs Inc., whose goal was to create a universal graphic symbol language to be understood by any members of culture, no matter how primitive. In his later years Modley was management consultant for several trade associations. Modley died in the Illinois Masonic Medical Center in Chicago in 1976.

== Design Principles ==
In his monograph Pictographs and Graphs, Modley summarized his belief that a symbol should:

- Follow principles of good design.
- Be usable in either large or small sizes.
- Represent a general concept, not an individual one.
- Be clearly distinguishable from other symbols.
- Be interesting.
- Be capable of being used as a counting unit.
- Be usable in outline or in silhouette.

== Reception ==
In the late 1930s, the work of Otto Neurath and his method of picture statistics—first called the Vienna method and later by the acronymic nickname "Isotype" from the project's full title: International System of Typographic Picture Education—had become influential, and with it Modley was a rising star. In his famous 1937 thesis Howard G. Funkhouser had stipulated Otto Neurath and the Vienna Method, as follows:

"The Vienna Method of Picture Statistics. - The most rapidly growing system of graphic representation with the drive of vigorous propaganda behind it is the "Vienna method" recently developed by its active exponent, Dr. OTTO NEURATH, formerly of Vienna. Dr. NEURATH'S chief contribution to the phase of the graphic method known as picture statistics has been the development of a standard symbolism for the pictures and hieroglyphs suggested and used by earlier writers, chiefly BRINTON, HASKELL and KARSTEN."

Although Funkhouser didn't call Modley by name, he did refer to his company Pictorial Statistics, Inc. with the text:

"Aided by the work of NEURATH and his associates but separated from the basic theory and philosophy which characterizes their use by NEURATH, picture statistics are growing in favor with busi- ness organizations and others who desire to present statistics in a popular manner. An organization has been formed recently in the United States for the purpose of supplying this type of graphic material."

A 1938 article in The New Yorker, entitled "Modley's Little Men," brought forward the role of Modley, and described their key-message:

... It's Doctor Neurath's (and Mr. Modley's) theory that the strain of present-day prose is a little too much for the average man, and that if you want to be sure he grasps an idea you'd better resort to pictures...

The article concluded that this was "discouraging, but probably true."

== Selected publications ==
- Rudolf Modley, How to use pictorial statistics, New York and London, Harper and brothers, 1937.
- Louis M. Hacker, Rudolf Modley and George Rogers Taylor. The United States: A Graphic History,New York, Modern Age Books, Inc, 1938.
- Luther Gulick and Rudolf Modley. The New York primer; a picture book for the more easy attaining an understanding of New York's school problems, The Regents' inquiry, 1939.
- Rudolf Modley, Aviation facts and figures. Aerospace Industries Association of America, 1945.
- Thomas R. Carskadon and Rudolf Modley, U.S.A., measure of a nation; a graphic presentation of America's needs and resources. New York, Macmillan Co., 1949.
- Rudolf Modley and William R. Myers. Handbook of pictorial symbols: 3,250 examples from international sources. Courier Corporation, 1976.

Articles, a selection

- Modley, Rudolf. "Pictographs Today and Tomorrow." The Public Opinion Quarterly 2.4 (1938): 659-664.
- Margaret Mead and Rudolf Modley. "Communication among all people, everywhere." Natural History 77.7 (1968): 56-63.
