= Solomon Telingater =

Soviet graphic artist and illustrator

Solomon Telingater (1903 – 1969) was a Soviet graphic artist, illustrator, printer, typographer, and book designer.

Solomon Telingater was born in Tbilisi in present-day Georgia in 1903 and moved to Baku in present-day Azerbaijan in 1910.

Along with Gustav Klutsis, Alexander Rodchenko, El Lissitzky, and others, Telingater was a founding member of the October group, a collective of Constructivist artists formed in 1928.

== See also ==
- List of Soviet poster artists
- Constructivism (art)
- Photomontage
