= Pressa =

International press exhibition held in Cologne (May–October 1928)

1928 Cologne, German Reich

Overview
- BIE-class: Unrecognized exposition
- Name: Pressa
- Building(s): HAG-Turm

Location
- City: Cologne, German Reich

Timeline
- Opening: May 1928
- Closure: October 1928

Pressa was an International Press Exhibition held in Cologne between May and October, 1928.

As German exhibitors were barred from participating in the Exposition International des Arts Décoratifs et Industriels Modern held in Paris in 1925, that this exhibition was held in Germany indicated the rehabilitation of Germany as regards international projects of this kind.

== Pavilions ==
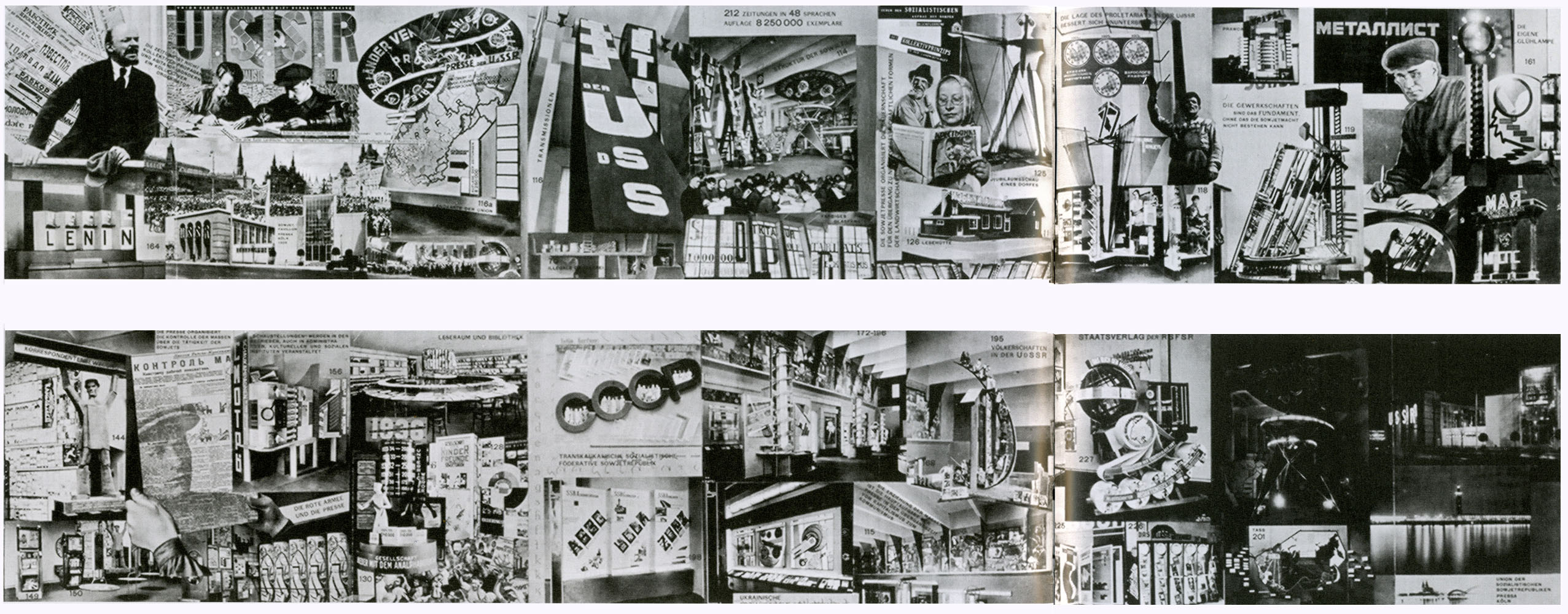
El Lissitzky's photomontage brochure, showing his designs for the Soviet pavilion.

=== Soviet Pavilion ===
El Lissitzky was responsible for the Soviet pavilion, which received critical acclaim. He had the support of Aleksandr Naumov, Sergei Senkin and Gustav Klutsis.

=== Czechoslovak Pavilion ===
Ladislav Sutnar was responsible for the Czechoslovak pavilion. In this he was aided by Augustin Tschinkel.

=== Advertising constructions ===
As well as country pavilions, companies also contributed buildings.

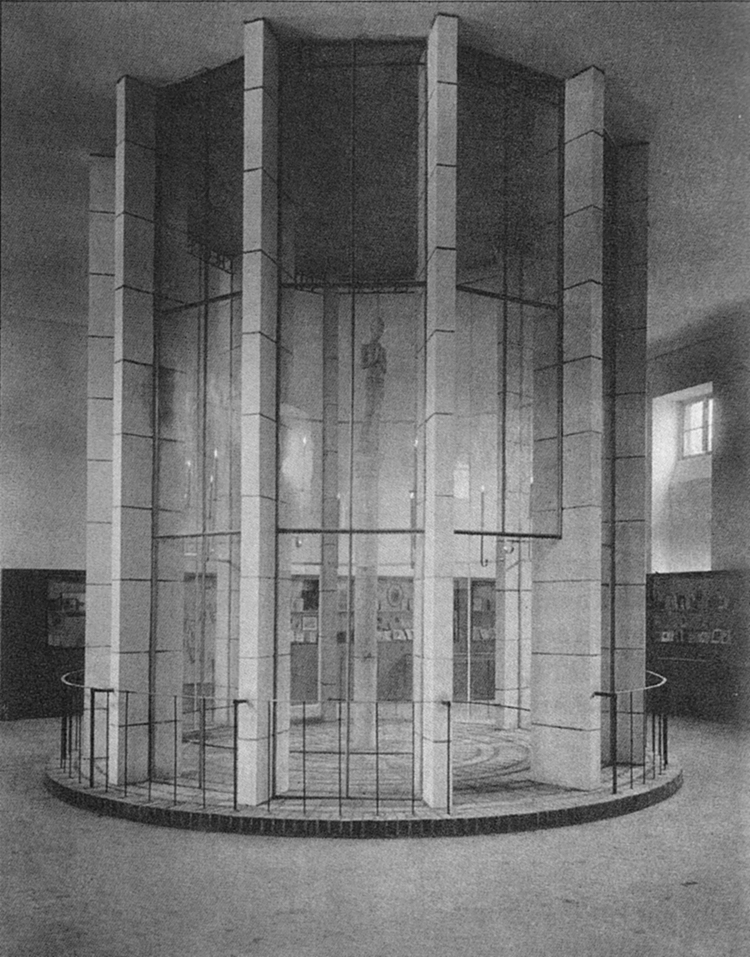
Contribution by Dominikus Böhm

==== HAG-Turm ====
The HAG-Turm was a 42m tower built for Café HAG. This was built in 70 days. The architect was Bernhard Hoetger, an architect who had previously worked for Ludwig Roselius, the founder of Café Hag. The building had ten storeys which contained all the working machinery necessary to create a working factory. 37 flags were on display on the front of tower representing the global reach of the company. Statistical and historical information was provided about coffee production, highlighting the part played by Café HAG. Scientific and medical experts were also present to provide further information to the public. Café HAG had become famous for their process of decaffination and so there was also information about the bad effects of caffeine on human and animal health.
