= Elisabeth Nemeth =

Austrian philosopher

- Born: 1951 (age 74–75)

Education
- Education: University of Vienna (PhD)

Philosophical work
- Era: 21st-century philosophy
- Region: Western philosophy
- Institutions: University of Vienna
- Main interests: philosophy of science
- Website: https://elisabethnemeth.com/

Elisabeth P. Nemeth (born 1951) is an Austrian philosopher and retired professor of philosophy at the University of Vienna. She is known for her works on logical empiricism.

== Books ==
- Maria Carla Galavotti, Elisabeth Nemeth, and Friedrich Stadler (eds.), European Philosophy of Science -- Philosophy of Science in Europe and the Viennese Heritage (Institute Vienna Circle Yearbook, Volume 17), Springer, 2014, ISBN 9783319018980.
- Elisabeth Nemeth and Friedrich Stadler (eds.), Die Europäische Wissenschaftsphilosophie und das Wiener Erbe (Institute Vienna Circle Yearbook, Volume 18), Springer, 2013, ISBN 9783709115787.
- Volker Thurm and Elisabeth Nemeth (ed.): Wien und der Wiener Kreis: Orte einer unvollendeten Moderne; ein Begleitbuch, Schriftenreihe Wissenschaftliche Weltauffassung und Kunst; Sonderbd., WUV, Vienna 2003, ISBN 3-85114-777-4, 348 f. (German)
