= Gerd Arntz =

German artist

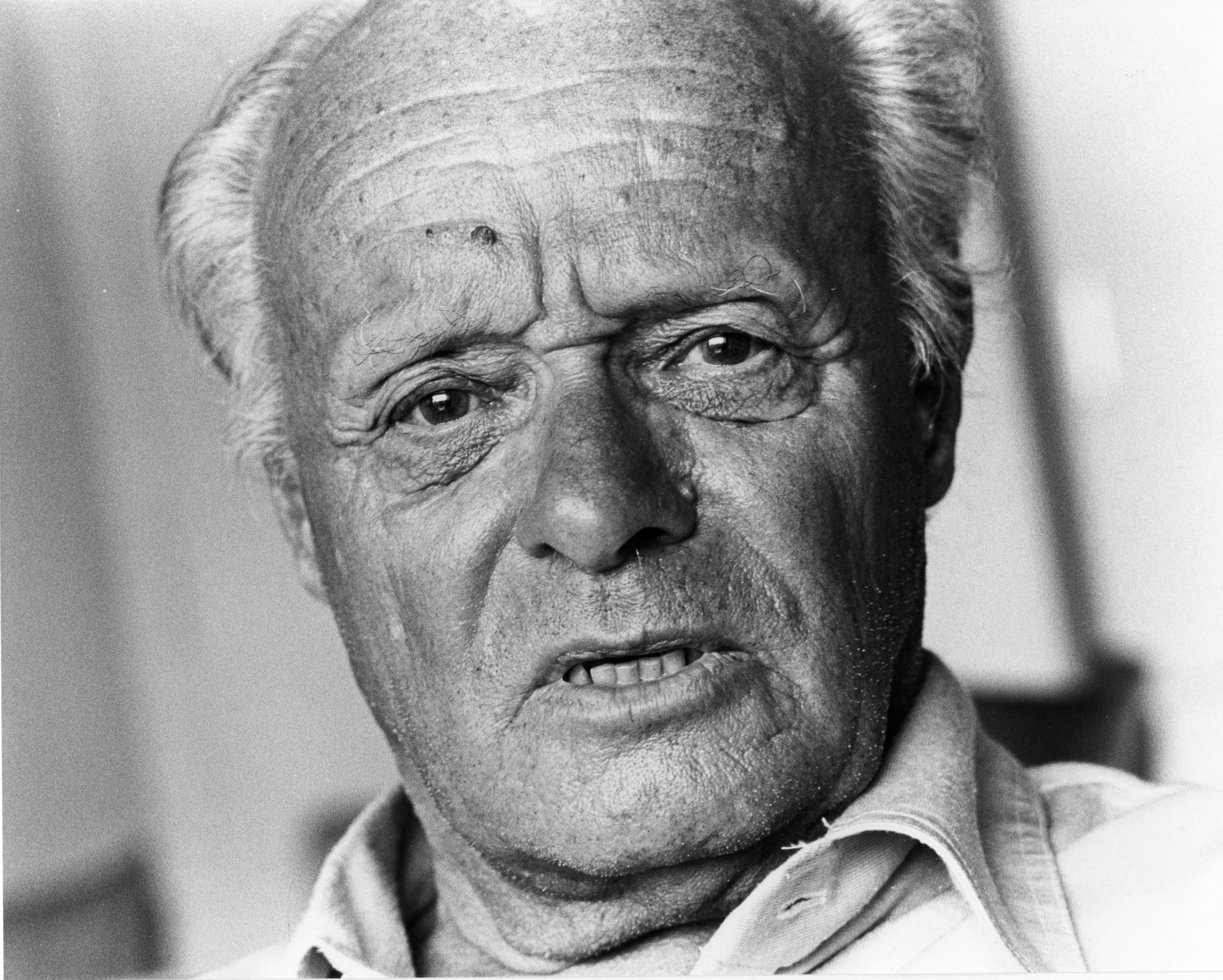
- Arntz in 1982
- Born: 11 December 1900; Remscheid, German Empire
- Died: 4 December 1988 (aged 87); The Hague, The Netherlands
- Known for: co-creator of Isotype
- Style: Constructivism, Figurative Constructivism

Gerd Arntz (11 December 1900 – 4 December 1988) was a German Modernist artist renowned for his black and white woodcuts. A core member of the Cologne Progressives, he was also a council communist. The Cologne Progressives participated in the revolutionary unions AAUD (KAPD) and its offshoot the AAUE in the 1920s. In 1928 Arntz contributed prints to the AAUE paper Die Proletarische Revolution, calling for workers to abandon parliament and form and participate in worker's councils. These woodcut prints feature recurring themes of class.

== Biography ==
Born into a family of Protestant merchants, Arntz was educated at a private academy in Düsseldorf and later attended the school of applied arts in Barmen (1921). He acquired the Düsseldorf studio of Otto Dix in 1925, when Dix moved to Berlin. Arntz travelled widely through Europe, and lived in Vienna, Cologne, and Moscow among other cities. Arntz was a core member of the Cologne Progressives art group.

From 1926 Otto Neurath sought his collaboration in designing pictograms for the Vienna Method of Pictorial Statistics (Wiener Methode der Bildstatistik; later renamed Isotype). From the beginning of 1929 Arntz worked at the Gesellschafts- und Wirtschaftsmuseum (Social and economic museum) directed by Neurath in Vienna. Eventually, Arntz designed around 4000 pictograms.

Between 1931 and 1934 he travelled periodically to the Soviet Union (along with Neurath and Marie Reidemeister) in order to help set up the 'All-union institute of pictorial statistics of Soviet construction and economy' (Всесоюзный институт изобразительной статистики советского строительства и хозяйства), commonly abbreviated to IZOSTAT (ИЗОСТАТ).

After the brief civil war in Austria in 1934 he emigrated to the Netherlands, joining Neurath and Reidemeister in The Hague, where they continued their collaboration at the International Foundation for Visual Education. Arntz cultivated a wide acquaintance among the artists and political activists of his generation.

== Wartime experiences ==
When the Nazis invaded the Netherlands in May 1940, Arntz just missed escaping to England with Neurath. However he was able to salvage much of Neurath's belongings and the contents of the Mundaneum with the help of the Dutch Central Bureau of Statistics (CBS). With the support of Philip Idenburg of the CBS he joined Jan van Ettinger in establishing the Dutch Foundation for Statistics in The Hague. Here he continued the isotype approach to infographics. However, in 1943, this was interrupted when he was conscripted into German military service and later was a prisoner of war.

== After the War ==
Neurath wrote in support of Arntz's anti-fascist activity and he was eventually released in 1946 and returned to the Netherlands where Idenburg vouched for him when he was arrested as an alien. He returned to work for the CBS, where he stayed until retirement in 1965.

== Bibliography ==
- 'Gerd Arntz, graphic designer' 010 Publishers, Rotterdam 2010. 288 pages. Awarded with "Bronze Medal, Best Book Design from all over the World" Leipzig 2011. Awarded with 'The best Dutch book designs 2010'. Edited by Ed Annink (Ontwerpwerk) and Max Bruinsma.
- Gesellschaft und Wirtschaft. Bildstatistisches Elementarwerk,, Leipzig: Bibliographisches Institut, 1932.
- Bohnen, Ulli and Kees Vollemans, Politieke prenten tussen twee oorlogen, Nijmegen: Socialistische Uitgeverij Nijmegen, 1973
- Gerd Arntz, 60 Holzschnitte aus den Jahren 1924–1938, Bremen: Galerie Rolf Ohse, 1975
- Bool, Flip, Democratic Graphics – The political and graphic work of Gerd Arntz 1920–1940. In: DESIGNABILITIES Design Research Journal, (12) 2020. ISSN 2511-6274
- Bool, Flip and Broos, Kees (eds),Gerd Arntz, Kritische grafiek en beeldstatistiek, Kritische Grafik und Bildstatistik, Nijmegen: SUN and Den Haag: Haags Gemeentemuseum, Sunschrift 113, 1976
- Broos, Kees, Symbolen voor onderwijs en statistiek, 1928–1965, Wenen, Moskou, Den Haag, Den Haag: Spruijt, 1979 (?)
- Stadler, Friedrich (ed.), Arbeiterbildung in der Zwischenkriegszeit, Otto Neurath und sein Gesellschafts- und Wirtschaftsmuseum in Wien 1925–1935, Politische Grafik von Gerd Arntz und den Konstruktiven, Wien, München: Löcker, 1982. see also:
- Stadler, Friedrich and Elisabeth Nemeth, eds., Encyclopedia and Utopia, Dordrecht: Kluwer, 1996. and
- Stadler, Friedrich, Studien zum Wiener Kreis. Frankfurt a. M., 1997
- Gerd Arntz, Monographie-Reihe Remscheider Künstler, Nr. 2, Remscheid: Stadt Remscheid, 1982
- Broos, Kees (ed.), Gerd Arntz. De tijd under her mes. Hout- en linoleumsneden 1920–1970, Nijmegen: SUN, 1988, in German:
- Gerd Arntz, Zeit unterm Messer. Holz- und Linolschnitte 1920–1970, Köln: Leske, 1988
- (Roth, Lynette), Painting as a Weapon: Progressive Cologne 1920-33/ Seiwert – Hoerle – Arntz, Köln: Walter König, 2008. Catalogue for an exhibition at the Museum Cologne, curated by Lynette Roth.
- (Friedrich, Julia, ed.), Gerd Arntz, Holzschnitte, Graphische Sammlung, Museum Ludwig, No. 4, Köln: Museum Ludwig, 2008, 20 p. With a short essay by Lynette Roth, Gerd Arntz, Ausdruck in Holz.
- Galerie Glöckner, Köln. "Gerd Arntz, Frühe Grafik. Ausstellung zum 100.Geburtstag von Gerd Arntz (November 2000 – Januar 2001) . Katalog 132 S., über 90 Abb. mit Text zu allen ausgestellten Werken
