= Austrian Association for Settlements and Small Gardens =

The Austrian Settlement and Allotment Garden Association (German: Österreichischer Verband für Siedlungs- und Kleingartenwesen, OVSK) was an organisation established following the First World War to support people in need of housing and the allotment movement principally in and around Vienna.

The organisation was founded by Otto Neurath in 1921.

OVSK was the basis for the Museum für Siedlung und Städtebau ('Museum for Settlement and Town Planning'). Margarete Schütte-Lihotzky described her experiences working for the OVSK in her book Warum ich Architektin wurde (Why I Became an Architect).
