= Isotype (picture language) =

Method of pictorial representation

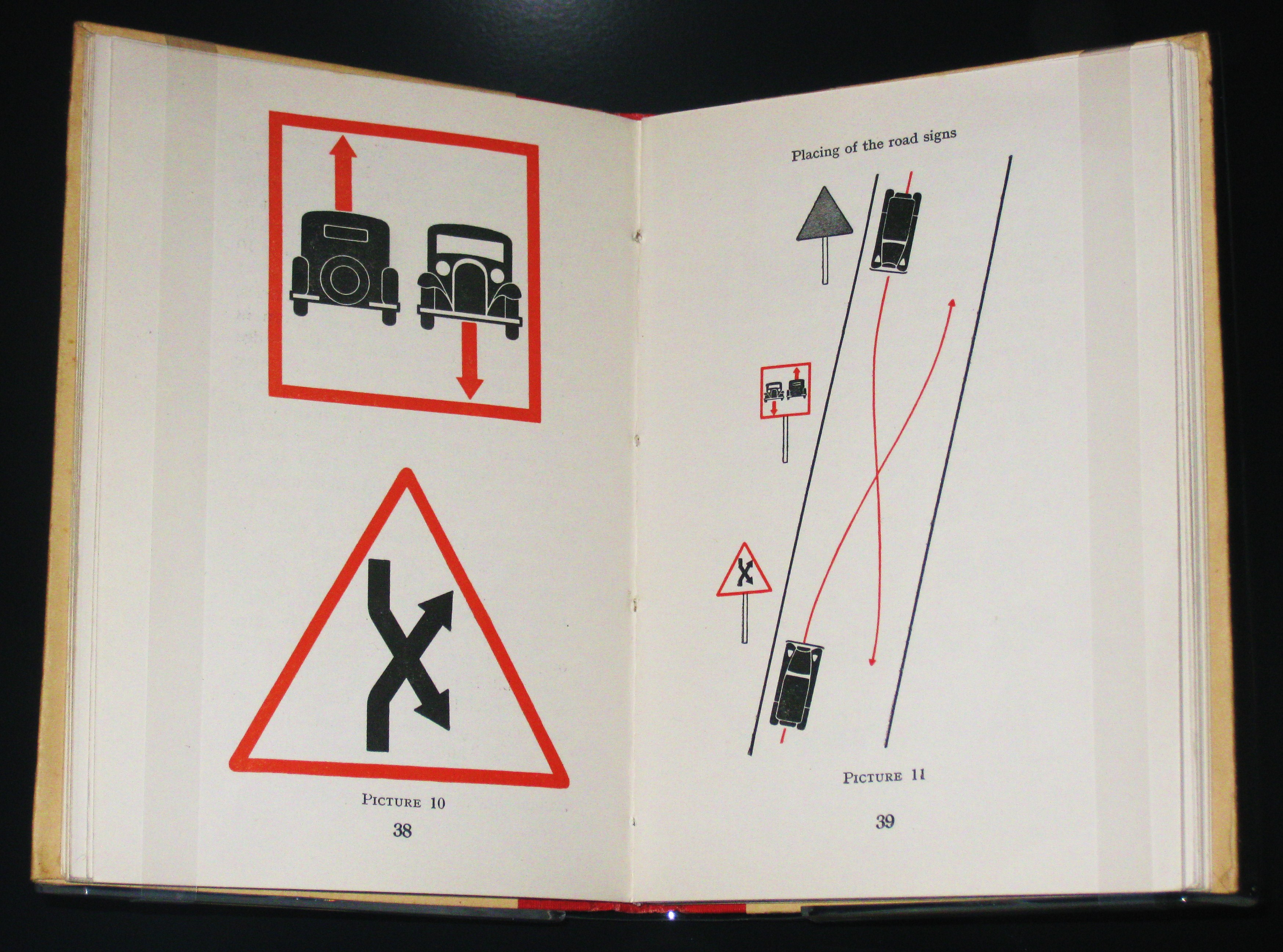
Pages from Neurath's International picture language, 1936

Isotype (International System of Typographic Picture Education) is a method of showing social, technological, biological, and historical connections in pictorial form. It consists of a set of standardized and abstracted pictorial symbols to represent social-scientific data with specific guidelines on how to combine the identical figures using serial repetition. It was first known as the Vienna Method of Pictorial Statistics (Wiener Methode der Bildstatistik), due to its having been developed at the Gesellschafts- und Wirtschaftsmuseum in Wien (Social and Economic Museum of Vienna) between 1925 and 1934. The founding director of this museum, Otto Neurath, was the initiator and chief theorist of the Vienna Method. Gerd Arntz was the artist responsible for realising the graphics. The term Isotype was applied to the method around 1935, after its key practitioners were forced to leave Vienna by the rise of Austrian fascism.

== Origin and development ==
The Gesellschafts- und Wirtschaftsmuseum was principally financed by the municipality of Vienna, during a period of expansive municipal social democratic governance known as Red Vienna within the new republic of Austria. An essential task of the museum was to inform the Viennese about their city. Neurath stated that the museum was not a treasure chest of rare objects, but a teaching museum. The aim was to "represent social facts pictorially" and to bring "dead statistics" to life by making them visually attractive and memorable. One of the museum's catch-phrases was: "To remember simplified pictures is better than to forget accurate figures". The principal instruments of the Vienna Method were pictorial charts, which could be produced in multiple copies and serve both permanent and travelling exhibitions. The museum also innovated with interactive models and other attention-grabbing devices, and there were even some early experiments with animated films.

From its beginning the Vienna Method/Isotype was the work of a team. Neurath built up a kind of prototype for an interdisciplinary graphic design agency. In 1926 he encountered woodcut prints by the German artist Gerd Arntz and invited him to collaborate with the museum. There was a further meeting in 1928 when Neurath attended the Pressa international exhibition. Arntz moved to Vienna in 1929 and took up a full-time position there. His simplified graphic style benefited the design of repeatable pictograms that were integral to Isotype. The influence of these pictograms on today's information graphics is immediately apparent, although perhaps not yet fully recognized.

A central task in Isotype was the "transformation" of complex source information into a sketch for a self-explanatory chart. The principal "transformer" from the beginning was Marie Reidemeister (who became Marie Neurath in 1941).

A defining project of the first phase of Isotype (then still known as the Vienna Method) was the monumental collection of 100 statistical charts, Gesellschaft und Wirtschaft (1930).

== Principles ==
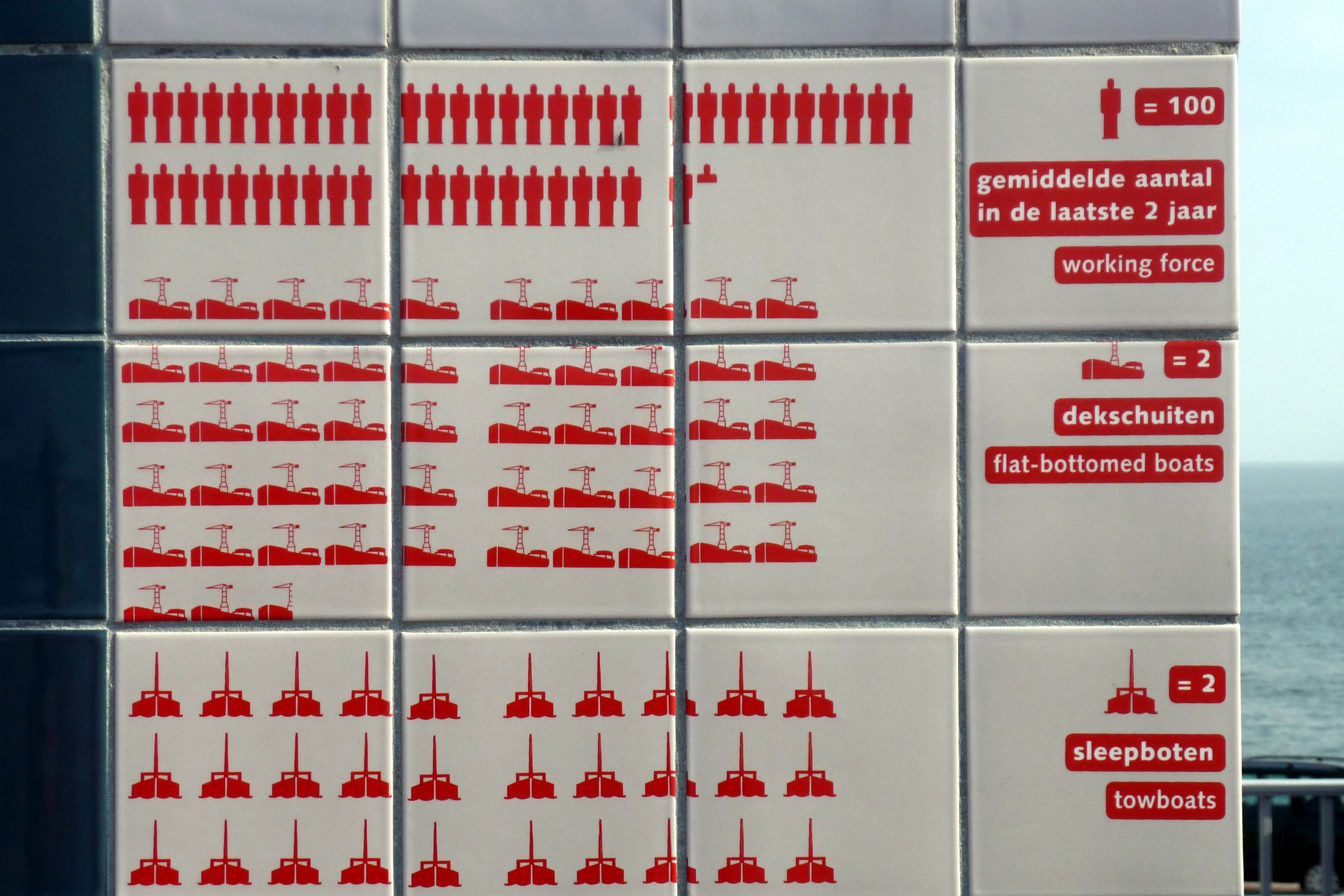
Isotypes showing statistics as numbers of pictograms

The first rule of Isotype is that greater quantities are not represented by an enlarged pictogram but by a greater number of the same-sized pictogram. In Neurath’s view, variation in size does not allow accurate comparison (what is to be compared – height/length or area?) whereas repeated pictograms, which always represent a fixed value within a certain chart, can be counted if necessary. Isotype pictograms almost never depicted things in perspective in order to preserve this clarity, and there were other guidelines for graphic configuration and use of colour. The best exposition of Isotype technique remains Otto Neurath’s book International picture language (1936).

"Visual education" was always the prime motive behind Isotype, which was worked out in exhibitions and books designed to inform ordinary citizens (including schoolchildren) about their place in the world. It was never intended to replace verbal language; it was a "helping language" always accompanied by verbal elements. Otto Neurath realized that it could never be a fully developed language, so instead he called it a “language-like technique”.

== Diffusion and adaptation ==
As more requests came to the Vienna museum from abroad, a partner institute called Mundaneum (a name adopted from an abortive collaboration with Paul Otlet) was established in 1931/2 to promote international work. It formed branches containing small exhibitions in Berlin, The Hague, London and New York City. Members of the Vienna team travelled periodically to the Soviet Union during the early 1930s in order to help set up the 'All-union institute of pictorial statistics of Soviet construction and economy' (Всесоюзный институт изобразительной статистики советского строительства и хозяйства), commonly abbreviated to IZOSTAT (ИЗОСТАТ), which produced statistical graphics about the Five Year Plans, among other things.

After the closure of the Gesellschafts- und Wirtschaftsmuseum in 1934 Neurath, Reidemeister and Arntz fled to the Netherlands, where they set up the International Foundation for Visual Education in The Hague. During the 1930s significant commissions were received from the US, including a series of mass-produced charts for the National Tuberculosis Association and Otto Neurath’s book Modern man in the making (1939), a high point of Isotype on which he, Reidemeister and Arntz worked in close collaboration.

Rudolf Modley, who served as an assistant to Otto Neurath in Vienna, introduced ISOTYPE methods to the United States through his position as chief curator at the Museum of Science and Industry in Chicago. Furthermore, by 1934 Modley established Pictorial Statistics Incorporated in New York, a company which promoted the production and distribution of ISOTYPE-like pictographs for education, news, and other forms of communications. Beginning in 1936, Modley's pictographs were used in a nationwide public health campaign for US Surgeon General Thomas Parran's "War on Syphilis."

Otto and Marie Neurath fled from German invasion to England, where they established the Isotype Institute in 1942. In Britain Isotype was applied to wartime publications sponsored by the Ministry of Information and to documentary films produced by Paul Rotha. After Otto Neurath’s death in 1945, Marie Neurath and her collaborators continued to apply Isotype to tasks of representing many kinds of complex information, especially in popular science books for young readers. A real test of the international ambitions of Isotype, as Marie Neurath saw it, was the project to design information for civic education, election procedure and economic development in the Western Region of Nigeria in the 1950s.

In 2025, an exhibition titled "Wissen für alle: Isotype" opened at the Vienna Museum. According to the Guardian, it demonstrated how Isotype "ended up influencing pop art, graphic design and electronic musicians from Kraftwerk to OMD."

== Archive ==
In 1971 the Isotype Institute gave its working material to the University of Reading, where it is housed in the Department of Typography & Graphic Communication as the Otto and Marie Neurath Isotype Collection. The responsibilities of the institute were transferred to the university in 1981.

== See also ==
- Data visualization
- Information design
- Information graphics

== Bibliography ==
- Otto Neurath, International picture language. London: Kegan Paul, 1936. Facsimile reprint: Department of Typography & Graphic Communication, University of Reading, 1980.
- Michael Twyman, ‘The significance of Isotype’, 1975
- Robin Kinross, ‘On the Influence of Isotype’. Information Design Journal, ii/2, 1981, pp. 122–30.
- Marie Neurath and Robin Kinross. The transformer: principles of making Isotype charts. London: Hyphen Press, 2009.
- Otto Neurath, From hieroglyphics to Isotype: a visual autobiography. London, Hyphen Press, 2010.
- Christopher Burke, Eric Kindel, Sue Walker (eds), Isotype: design & contexts, 1925–1971. London, Hyphen Press, 2013
- Lewi, Paul J. (2006). Speaking of Graphics.
