= Gesellschafts- und Wirtschaftsmuseum =

Coordinates: 48.1839°N 16.3569°E

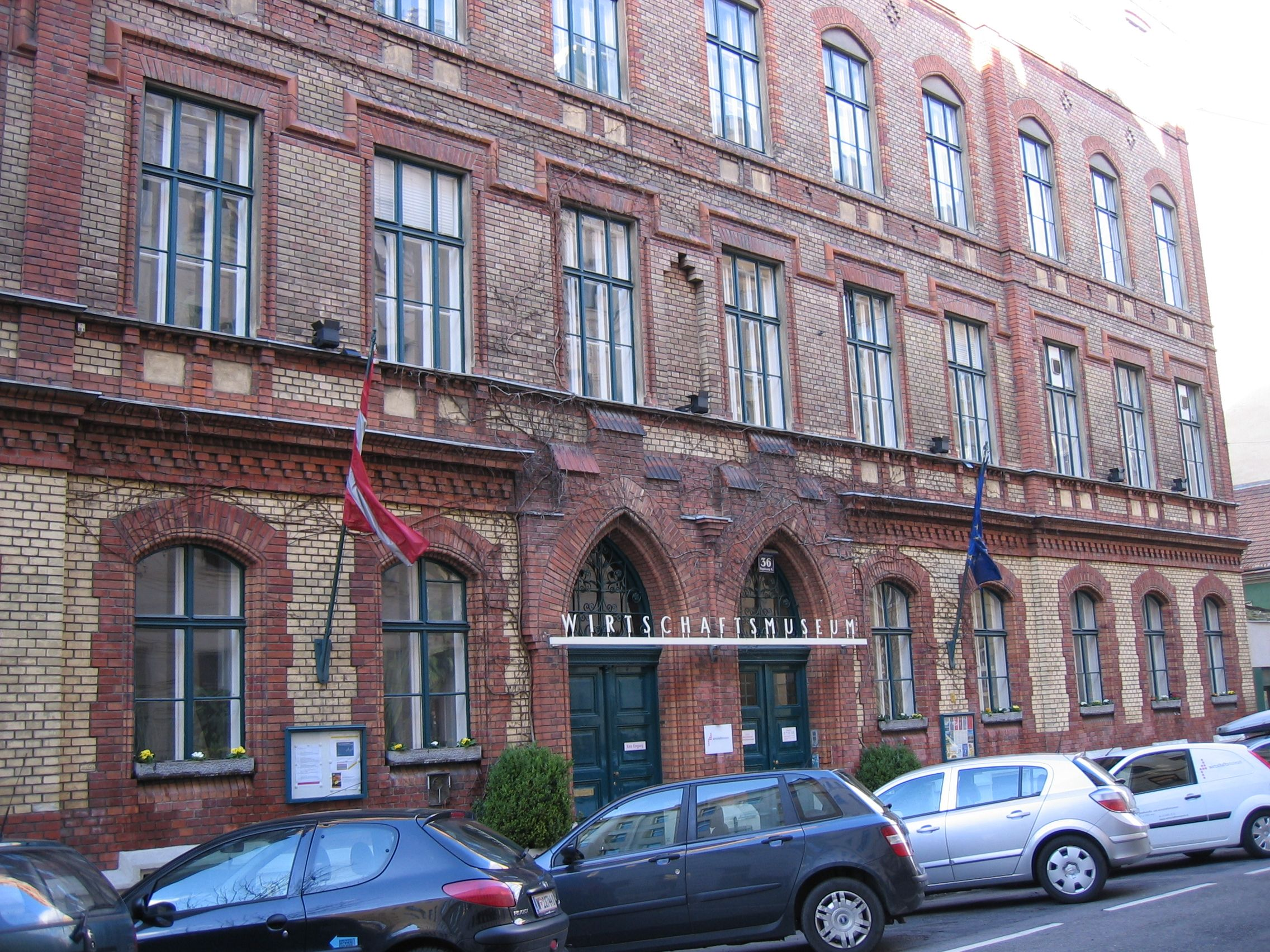
Das Wirtschafts- und Kaffeemuseum

The Gesellschafts- und Wirtschaftsmuseum (Museum for Social and Economic Affairs) is a museum located in Margareten, Vienna.

== History ==
Following World War I, Vienna experienced extreme devastation and deprivation which radicalized architects and designers. This inspired them to engage in class politics and confront the city’s housing shortage. The Gesellschafts-und Wirtschaftmuseum (also known as the Museum of Society and Business) was established in 1924.

The original Gesellschafts- und Wirtschaftsmuseum (GeWiMu) existed from January 1925 until it was suppressed by the Austrofascists in February 1934. It was the base for the development of the Vienna Method. It was founded by Otto Neurath and evolved out of the Museum für Siedlung und Städtebau (Museum for Settlement and Town Planning). This had been set up following Neurath's involvement in the Austrian Association for Settlements and Small Gardens. The museum developed a collaborative relationship with the Otto Glöckel. In 1927, Willem Sandberg visited Vienna, where he studied the Isotype system at the museum. In 1928 Neurath recruited Gerd Arntz from Düsseldorf to lead the Art and Design team there. Arntz was originally unsure about whether to take up the job offer, but thanks to the encouragement of Franz Seiwert he accepted and was soon joined by Peter Alma and Augustin Tschinkel, both also associated with the Cologne Progressives, the art group Seiwert and Arntz had set up.

=== Vienna Method ===
The GeWiMu was the home of one of the most significant developments in graphic design: the Vienna Method. This evolved out of Neurath's desire to produce informational material which was understandable regardless of the language skills of the onlooker.

== Directors ==
- 1924-1934 Otto Neurath
- 1945-1972 Franz Rauscher, a student of Otto Neurath founded the Austrian Institute of Economic and Social Affairs statistics
- 1972-2000 Josef Docekal Under his leadership, the public museum re-established in 1988
- 2000–present Hans Hartweger runs the museum
