= Otto Neurath =

Austrian economist, philosopher and sociologist (1882–1945)

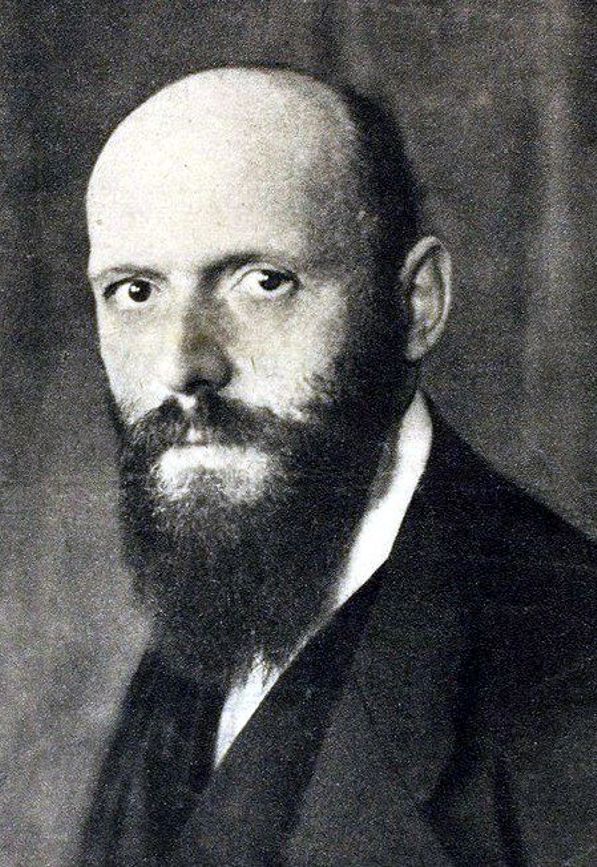
- Photo of Neurath published in 1919
- Born: Otto Karl Wilhelm Neurath; 10 December 1882; Vienna, Austro-Hungarian Empire (now Austria)
- Died: 22 December 1945 (aged 63); Oxford, England

Education
- Education: University of Vienna (no degree); University of Berlin (Ph.D., 1906); Heidelberg University (Dr. phil. hab., 1917)
- Theses: Zur Anschauung der Antike über Handel, Gewerbe und Landwirtschaft (On the Conceptions in Antiquity of Trade, Commerce and Agriculture) (1906); Die Kriegswirtschaftslehre und ihre Bedeutung für die Zukunft (War Economics and Their Importance for the Future) (1917)
- Doctoral advisor: Gustav Schmoller; Eduard Meyer

Philosophical work
- Era: 20th-century philosophy
- Region: Western philosophy
- School: Analytic philosophy Logical positivism Vienna Circle; Epistemic coherentism
- Institutions: New Vienna Commercial Academy; Heidelberg University
- Main interests: Philosophy of science, sociology, political economy, logic, pedagogy, museology
- Notable ideas: Physicalism; Protokollsatz (protocol statement); Neurath's boat Isotype

Otto Karl Wilhelm Neurath (/ˈnɔɪrɑːt/; Austrian German: [ˈɔtoː ˈnɔʏraːt]; 10 December 1882 – 22 December 1945) was an Austrian-born philosopher of science, sociologist, and political economist. Considered "one of the neglected geniuses of the twentieth century", Neurath, among other things, invented the ISOTYPE method of pictorial statistics and an innovator in museum practice. Before he fled his native country in 1934, Neurath was one of the leading figures of the Vienna Circle.

== Early life ==
Neurath was born in Vienna, the son of Wilhelm Neurath (1840–1901), a well-known Jewish political economist at the time. Otto's mother was a Protestant, and he would also become one. Helene Migerka was his cousin. He studied mathematics and physics at the University of Vienna (he formally enrolled for classes only for two semesters in 1902–3). In 1906, he gained his Ph.D. in the department of Political Science and Statistics at the University of Berlin with a thesis entitled Zur Anschauung der Antike über Handel, Gewerbe und Landwirtschaft (On the Conceptions in Antiquity of Trade, Commerce and Agriculture).

He married Anna Schapire in 1907, who died in 1911 while bearing their son, Paul, and then married a close friend, the mathematician and philosopher Olga Hahn. Perhaps because of his second wife's blindness and then because of the outbreak of war, Paul was sent to a children's home outside Vienna, where Neurath's mother lived, and returned to live with both of his parents when he was nine years old.

== Career in Vienna ==
Neurath taught political economy at the New Vienna Commercial Academy in Vienna until war broke out. Subsequently, he directed the Department of War Economy in the War Ministry. In 1917, he completed his habilitation thesis Die Kriegswirtschaftslehre und ihre Bedeutung für die Zukunft (War Economics and Their Importance for the Future) at Heidelberg University. In 1918, he became director of the Deutsches Kriegswirtschaftsmuseum (German Museum of War Economy, later the "Deutsches Wirtschaftsmuseum") in Leipzig. There he worked with Wolfgang Schumann, known from the Dürerbund for which Neurath had written many articles. During the political crisis which led to the armistice, Schumann urged him to work out a plan for socialization in Saxony. Along with Schumann and Hermann Kranold developed the Programm Kranold-Neurath-Schumann. Neurath then joined the German Social Democratic Party in 1918–19 and ran an office for central economic planning in Munich. When the Bavarian Soviet Republic was defeated, Neurath was imprisoned but returned to Austria after intervention from the Austrian government. While in prison, he wrote Anti-Spengler, a critical attack on Oswald Spengler's Decline of the West.

In Red Vienna, he joined the Social Democrats and became secretary of the Austrian Association for Settlements and Small Gardens (Verband für Siedlungs-und Kleingartenwesen), a collection of self-help groups that set out to provide housing and garden plots to its members. In 1923, he founded a new museum for housing and city planning called Siedlungsmuseum. In 1925 he renamed it Gesellschafts- und Wirtschaftsmuseum in Wien (Museum of Society and Economy in Vienna) and founded an association for it, in which the Vienna city administration, the trade unions, the Chamber of Workers and the Bank of Workers became members. Then-mayor Karl Seitz acted as the first proponent of the association. Julius Tandler, city councillor for welfare and health, served on the first board of the museum together with other prominent social democratic politicians. The museum was provided with exhibition rooms in buildings of the city administration, the most prominent being the People's Hall at the Vienna City Hall.

Neurath was a contributor to the Social Democrat magazine Der Kampf.

To make the museum understandable for visitors from all around the polyglot Austro-Hungarian Empire, Neurath worked on graphic design and visual education, believing that "Words divide, pictures unite," a coinage of his own that he displayed on the wall of his office there. In the late 1920s, graphic designer and communications theorist Rudolf Modley served as an assistant to Neurath, contributing to a new means of communication: a visual "language." With the illustrator Gerd Arntz and with Marie Reidemeister (who he would marry in 1941), Neurath developed novel ways of representing quantitative information via easily interpretable icons. The forerunner of contemporary infographics, he initially called this the Vienna Method of Pictorial Statistics. As his ambitions for the project expanded beyond social and economic data related to Vienna, he renamed the project "Isotype", an acronymic nickname for the project's full title: International System of Typographic Picture Education. At international conventions of city planners, Neurath presented and promoted his communication tools. During the 1930s, he also began promoting Isotype as an International Picture Language, connecting it both with the adult education movement and with the Internationalist passion for new and artificial languages like Esperanto, although he stressed in talks and correspondence that Isotype was not intended to be a stand-alone language and was limited in what it could communicate.

In the 1920s, Neurath also became an ardent logical positivist, and was the main author of the Vienna Circle manifesto. He was the driving force behind the Unity of Science movement and the International Encyclopedia of Unified Science.

Neurath was a proponent of Esperanto, and attended the 1924 World Esperanto Congress in Vienna, where he met Rudolf Carnap for the first time. In 1927 he became Secretary of the Ernst Mach Society.

== Exile ==
=== Netherlands ===
During the Austrian Civil War in 1934, Neurath had been working in Moscow. Anticipating problems, he had asked to get a coded message in case it would be dangerous for him to return to Austria. As Marie Reidemeister reported later, after receiving the telegram "Carnap is waiting for you," Neurath chose to travel to The Hague, the Netherlands, instead of Vienna, to be able to continue his international work. He was joined by Arntz after affairs in Vienna had been sorted out as best they could. His wife also fled to the Netherlands, where she died in 1937.

=== British Isles ===
After the Luftwaffe had bombed Rotterdam, he and Marie Reidemeister fled to Britain, crossing the Channel with other refugees in an open boat. He and Reidemeister married in 1941 after a period of being interned on the Isle of Man (Neurath was in Onchan Camp). In Britain, he and his wife set up the Isotype Institute in Oxford and he was asked to advise on, and design Isotype charts for, the intended redevelopment of the slums of Bilston, near Wolverhampton.

Neurath died of a stroke, suddenly and unexpectedly, in December 1945. After his death, Marie Neurath continued the work of the Isotype Institute, publishing Neurath's writings posthumously, completing projects he had started and writing many children's books using the Isotype system, until her death in the 1980s.

== Contributions ==
=== Philosophy of science and language ===
Neurath's work on protocol statements tried to reconcile an empiricist concern for the grounding of knowledge in experience with the essential publicity of science. Neurath suggested that reports of experience should be understood to have a third-person and hence public and impersonal character, rather than as being first person subjective pronouncements. Bertrand Russell took issue with Neurath's account of protocol statements in his book An Inquiry Into Meaning and Truth (p. 139ff), on the grounds that it severed the connection to experience that is essential to an empiricist account of truth, facts and knowledge.

One of Neurath's later works, Physicalism, completely transformed the nature of the logical positivist discussion of the program of unifying the sciences. Neurath delineates and explains his points of agreement with the general principles of the positivist program and its conceptual bases:

- the construction of a universal system which would comprehend all of the knowledge furnished by the various sciences, and
- the absolute rejection of metaphysics, in the sense of any propositions not translatable into verifiable scientific sentences.

He then rejects the positivist treatment of language in general and, in particular, some of Wittgenstein's early fundamental ideas.

First, Neurath rejects the isomorphism between language and reality as useless metaphysical speculation, which would call for explaining how words and sentences could represent things in the external world. Instead, Neurath proposed that language and reality coincide—that reality consists simply of the totality of previously verified sentences in the language, and the "truth" of a sentence is about its relationship to the totality of already verified sentences. If a sentence fails to "concord" (or cohere) with the totality of already verified sentences, then either it should be considered false, or some of that totality's propositions must be modified somehow. He thus views truth as internal coherence of linguistic assertions, rather than anything to do with facts or other entities in the world. Moreover, the criterion of verification is to be applied to the system as a whole (see semantic holism) and not to single sentences. Such ideas profoundly shaped the holistic verificationism of Willard Van Orman Quine. Quine's book Word and Object (p. 3f) made famous Neurath's analogy, which compares the holistic nature of language and consequently scientific verification with the construction of a boat which is already at sea (cf. Ship of Theseus):

We are like sailors who on the open sea must reconstruct their ship but are never able to start afresh from the bottom. Where a beam is taken away a new one must at once be put there, and for this, the rest of the ship is used as support. In this way, by using the old beams and driftwood, the ship can be shaped entirely anew, but only by gradual reconstruction.

Keith Stanovich discusses this metaphor in context of memes and memeplexes and refers to this metaphor as a "Neurathian bootstrap".

Neurath also rejected the notion that science should be reconstructed in terms of sense data, because perceptual experiences are too subjective to constitute a valid foundation for the formal reconstruction of science. Thus, the phenomenological language that most positivists were still emphasizing was to be replaced by the language of mathematical physics. This would allow for the required objective formulations because it is based on spatio-temporal coordinates. Such a physicalistic approach to the sciences would facilitate the elimination of every residual element of metaphysics because it would permit them to be reduced to a system of assertions relative to physical facts.

=== Economics ===
In economics, Neurath was notable for his advocacy of ideas like "in-kind" economic accounting in place of monetary accounting. In the 1920s, he also advocated Vollsozialisierung, that is "complete" rather than merely partial "socialization". Thus, he advocated changes to the economic system that were more radical than those of the mainstream Social-Democratic parties of Germany and Austria. In the 1920s, Neurath debated these matters with leading Social Democratic theoreticians (such as Karl Kautsky, who insisted that money is necessary in a socialist economy. While serving as a government economist during the war, Neurath had observed that "As a result of the war, in-kind calculus was applied more often and more systematically than before ... war was fought with ammunition and with the supply of food, not with money" i.e. that goods were incommensurable. This convinced Neurath of the feasibility of economic planning in terms of amounts of goods and services, without use of money. In response to these ideas, Ludwig von Mises wrote his famous essay of 1920, "Economic Calculation in the Socialist Commonwealth".

Otto Neurath believed it was 'war socialism' that would come into effect after capitalism. For Neurath, war economies showed advantages in speed of decision and execution, optimal distribution of means relative to (military) goals, and no-nonsense evaluation and utilization of inventiveness. Two disadvantages which he perceived as resulting from centralized decision-making were a reduction in productivity and a loss of the benefits of simple economic exchanges; but he thought that the reduction in productivity could be mitigated by means of "scientific" techniques based on analysis of work-flows as advocated by Frederick Winslow Taylor. Neurath believed that socioeconomic theory and scientific methods could be applied together in contemporary practice.

Neurath's view on socioeconomic development was similar to the materialist conception of history first elaborated in classical Marxism, in which technology and the state of epistemology come into conflict with social organization. In particular, Neurath, influenced also by James George Frazer, associated the rise of scientific thinking and empiricism/positivism with the rise of socialism, both of which were coming into conflict with older modes of epistemology such as theology (which was allied with idealist philosophy), the latter of which served reactionary purposes. However, Neurath followed Frazer in claiming that primitive magic closely resembled modern technology, implying an instrumentalist interpretation of both. Neurath claimed that magic was unfalsifiable and therefore disenchantment could never be complete in a scientific age. Adherents of the scientific view of the world recognize no authority other than science and reject all forms of metaphysics. Under the socialist phase of history, Neurath predicted that the scientific worldview would become the dominant mode of thought.

== Selected publications ==
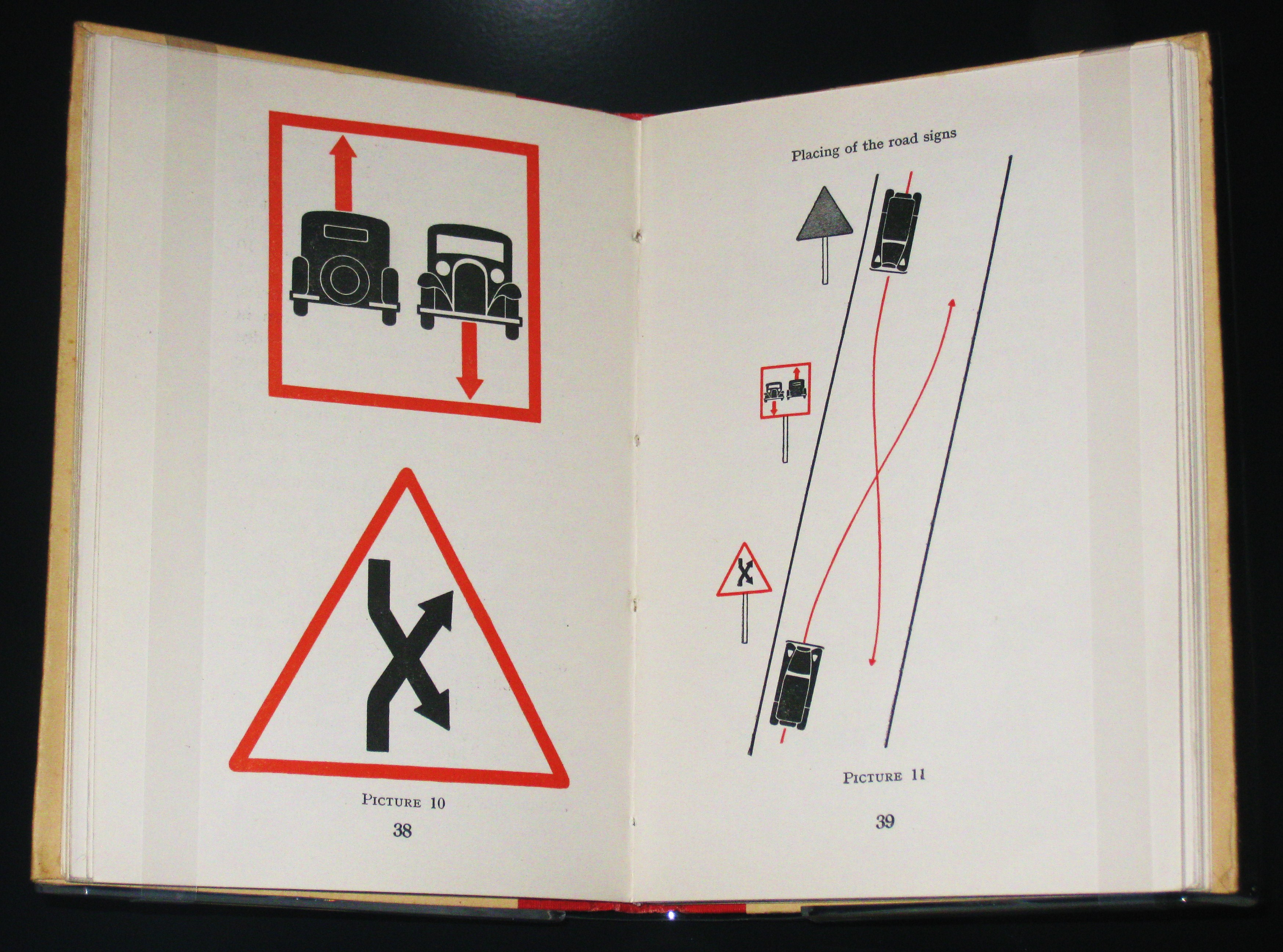
A photograph of the book Basic by Isotype, showing examples of the Isotype picture language that Neurath promoted.

Most publications by and about Neurath are still available only in German. However, he also wrote in English, using Ogden's Basic English. His scientific papers are held at the Noord-Hollands Archief in Haarlem; the Otto and Marie Neurath Isotype Collection is held in the Department of Typography & Graphic Communication at the University of Reading in England.

=== Books ===
- 1913. Serbiens Erfolge im Balkankriege: Eine wirtschaftliche und soziale Studie. Wien : Manz.
- 1921. Anti-Spengler. München, Callwey Verlag.
- 1926. Antike Wirtschaftsgeschichte. Leipzig, Berlin: B. G. Teubner.
- 1928. Lebensgestaltung und Klassenkampf. Berlin: E. Laub.
- 1933. Einheitswissenschaft und Psychologie. Wien.
- 1936. International Picture Language; the First Rules of Isotype. London: K. Paul, Trench, Trubner & co., ltd., 1936
- 1937. Basic by Isotype. London, K. Paul, Trench, Trubner & co., ltd.
- 1939. Modern Man in the Making. Alfred A. Knopf
- 1944. Foundations of the Social Sciences. University of Chicago Press
- 1944. International Encyclopedia of Unified Science. With Rudolf Carnap, and Charles W. Morris (eds.). University of Chicago Press.
- 1946. Philosophical Papers, 1913–1946: With a Bibliography of Neurath in English. Marie Neurath and Robert S. Cohen, with Carolyn R. Fawcett, eds. 1983
- 1973. Empiricism and Sociology. Marie Neurath and Robert Cohen, eds. With a selection of biographical and autobiographical sketches by Popper and Carnap. Includes abridged translation of Anti-Spengler.

=== Articles ===
- 1912. The problem of the pleasure maximum. In: Cohen and Neurath (eds.) 1983
- 1913. The lost wanderers of Descartes and the auxiliary motive. In: Cohen and Neurath 1983
- 1916. On the classification of systems of hypotheses. In: Cohen and Neurath 1983
- 1919. Through war economy to economy in kind. In: Neurath 1973 (a short fragment only)
- 1920a. Total socialisation. In: Cohen and Uebel 2004
- 1920b. A system of socialisation. In: Cohen and Uebel 2004
- 1928. Personal life and class struggle. In: Neurath 1973
- 1930. Ways of the scientific world-conception. In: Cohen and Neurath 1983
- 1931a. The current growth in global productive capacity. In: Cohen and Uebel 2004
- 1931b. Empirical sociology. In: Neurath 1973
- 1931c. Physikalismus . In: Scientia : rivista internazionale di sintesi scientifica, 50, 1931, pp. 297–303
- 1932. Protokollsätze (Protocol statements).In: Erkenntnis, Vol. 3. Repr.: Cohen and Neurath 1983
- 1935a. Pseudorationalism of falsification. In: Cohen and Neurath 1983
- 1935b. The unity of science as a task. In: Cohen and Neurath 1983
- 1937. Die neue enzyklopaedie des wissenschaftlichen empirismus . In: Scientia: rivista internazionale di sintesi scientifica, 62, 1937, pp. 309–320
- 1938 'The Departmentalization of Unified Science', Erkenntnis VII, pp. 240–46
- 1940. Argumentation and action. The Otto Neurath Nachlass in Haarlem 198 K.41
- 1941. The danger of careless terminology. In: The New Era 22: 145–50
- 1942. International planning for freedom. In: Neurath 1973
- 1943. Planning or managerial revolution. (Review of J. Burnham, The Managerial Revolution). The New Commonwealth 148–54
- 1943–5. Neurath–Carnap correspondence, 1943–1945. The Otto Neurath Nachlass in Haarlem, 223
- 1944b. Ways of life in a world community. The London Quarterly of World Affairs, 29–32
- 1945a. Physicalism, planning and the social sciences: bricks prepared for a discussion v. Hayek. 26 July 1945. The Otto Neurath Nachlass in Haarlem 202 K.56
- 1945b. Neurath–Hayek correspondence, 1945. The Otto Neurath Nachlass in Haarlem 243
- 1945c. Alternatives to market competition. (Review of F. Hayek, The Road to Serfdom). The London Quarterly of World Affairs 121–2
- 1946a. The orchestration of the sciences by the encyclopedism of logical empiricism. In: Cohen and. Neurath 1983
- 1946b. After six years. In: Synthese 5:77–82
- 1946c. The orchestration of the sciences by the encyclopedism of logical empiricism. In: Cohen and. Neurath 1983
- 1946. From Hieroglyphics to Isotypes. Nicholson and Watson. Excerpts. Rotha (1946) claims that this is in part Neurath's autobiography.
