= Friedrich Kurt Fiedler =

German graphic designer

Friedrich Kurt Fiedler (8 March 1894 – 11 November 1950) was a German graphic designer and a representative of the Social Democratic Party. During the Weimar Republic he was acknowledged for his poster design, his book illustrations and his drawings. After World War II, he belonged to the re-founders of the association of fine arts (Verein bildender Künstler) in Dresden, but lost his influence when all social-democratic forces were repelled.

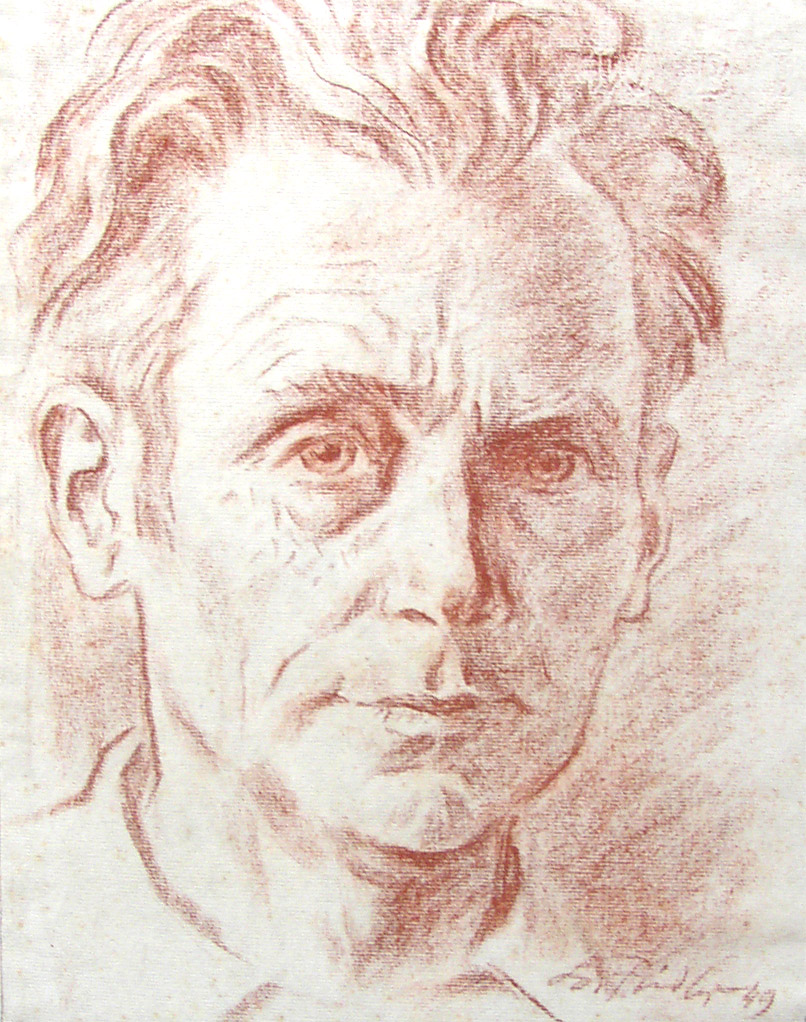
Kurt Fiedler

== Life ==
=== Early life and education ===
Kurt Fiedler was born in the little village of Eichbusch near Dresden as son of a carpenter. His teacher noticed his talent and convinced the parents of enabling him to take an artist's education after completing Volksschule.

Around 1910 he attended the evening classes of the Kunstgewerbeschule Dresden, together with Hermann Glöckner (later a renowned painter) and architect Edmund Schuchardt. It supported students that came from a humble family background and provided them with an education according to the ideas of Deutscher Werkbund. Fiedler and Glöckner became friends and jointly attended the figure drawing class of Carl Rade. From 1911 to 1915 Fiedler was supported by a grant to study as Meisterschüler (master's student) of Richard Guhr and Josef Goller.

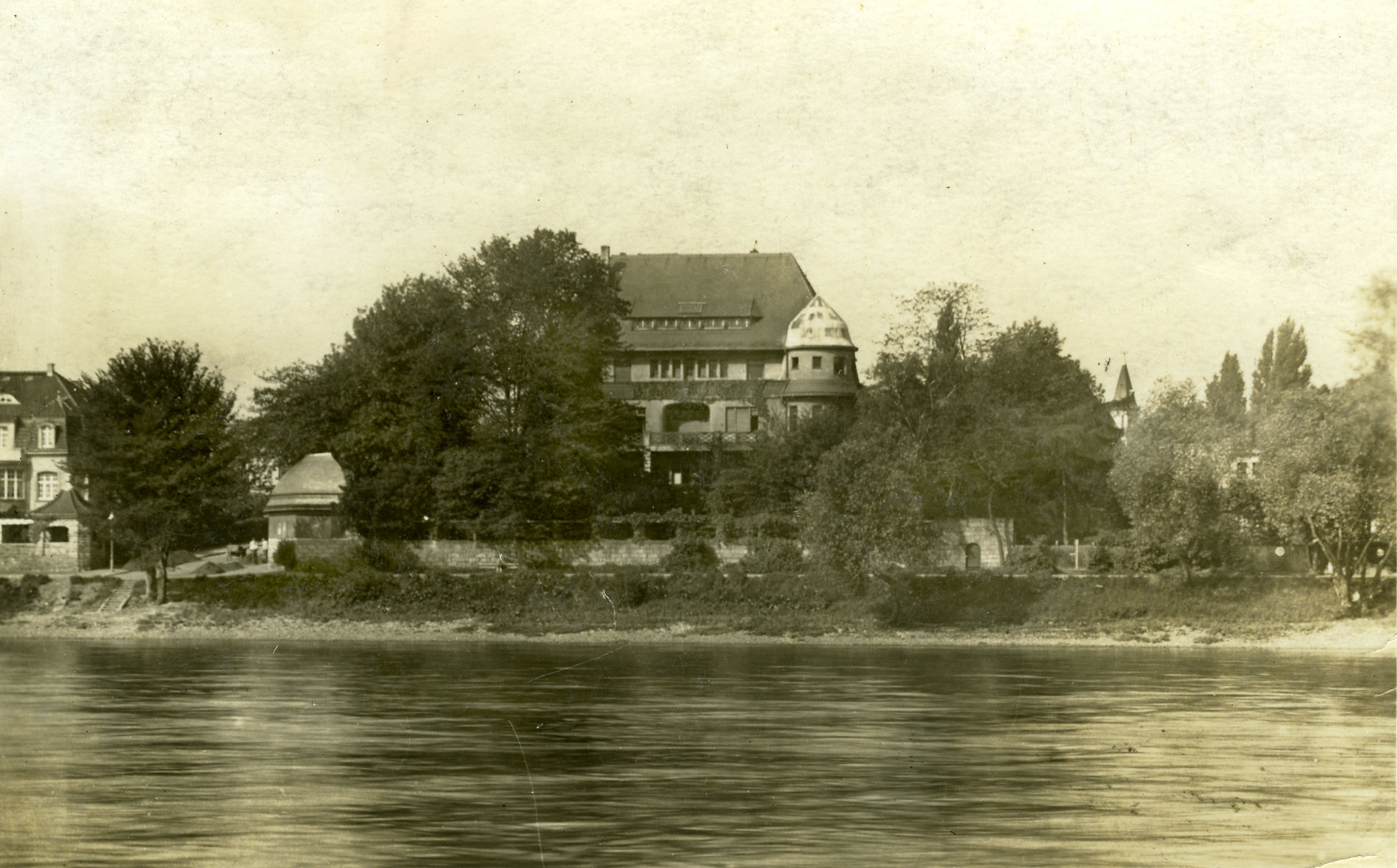
Dürerbundhaus Blasewitz

=== World War I and Weimar Republic ===
During World War I Fiedler was a front-line soldier in France. He learned French in self-study and became a translator. After 1920 Fiedler and his family took a flat in the culturally important Dürerbundhaus in Blasewitz. Here, Ferdinand Avenarius headed the leading cultural organization of all German speaking countries at that time, the Dürerbund. In this surrounding Kurt Fiedler immediately made essential contacts. He designed the masthead for the social democratic newspaper Dresdner Volkszeitung.

=== Nazi period ===
Immediately following the Machtergreifung, the new rulers ordered a search of Kurt Fiedler's house. He and especially the house owners Eva & Wolfgang Schumann, stepson of Ferdinand Avenarius, who had flown from Germany, were known as active social democrats. Among the fellow residents of the Dürerbundhaus in the next years was Götz Heidelberg, whose parents had overtaken a company in Dresden.

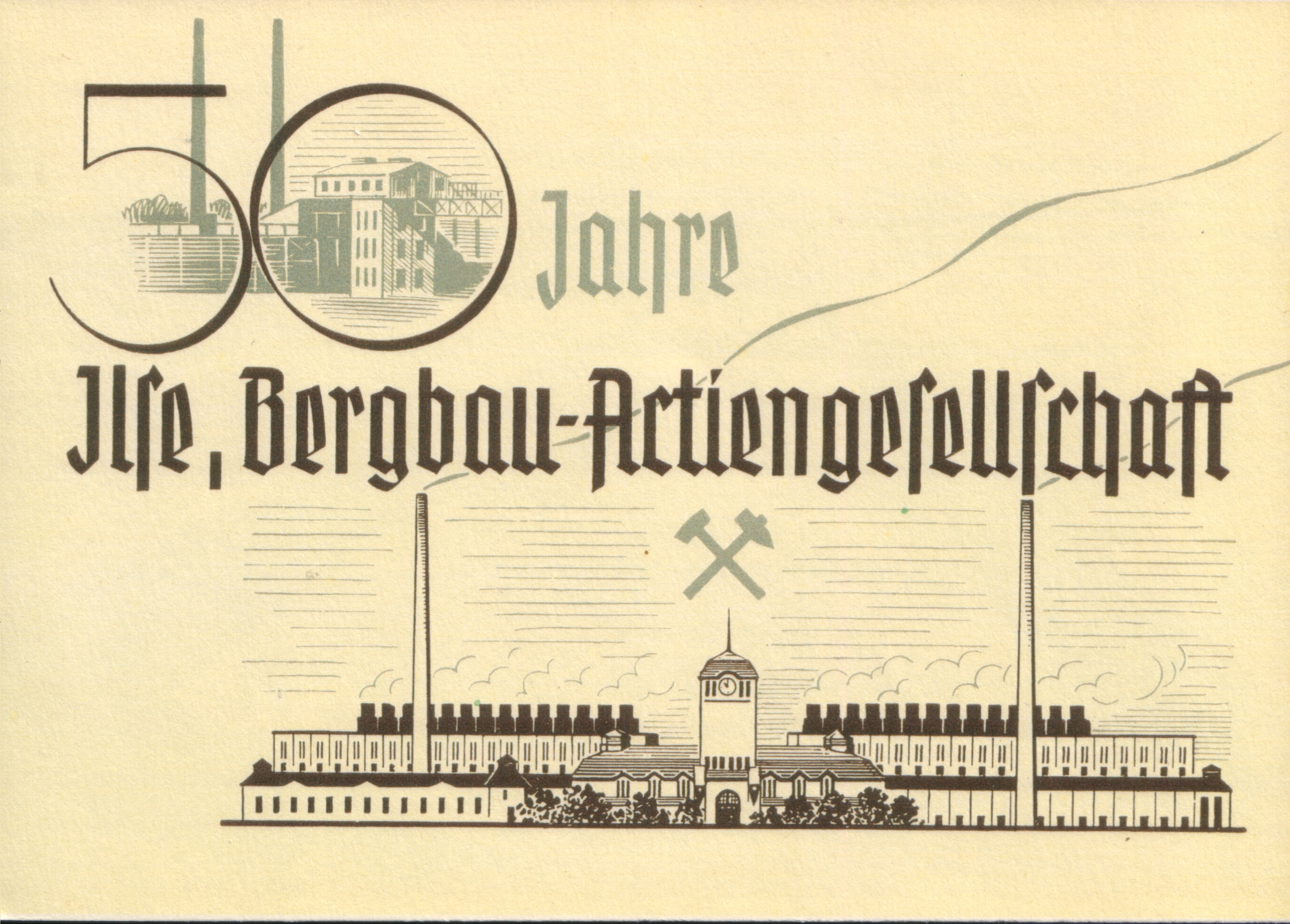
Advertisement by Kurt Fiedler

Some of Fiedler's former clients were banned as Kaden & Comp. resp. cumbered as Sarrasani. Fiedler could compensate less contracts with publishing houses to some extent by advertisement works for industrial clients. Shortly before the expropriation of the Jewish owners of Ilse Bergbau AG, Fiedler was charged with the advertisement on occasion of the 50th anniversary of the company. During early Nazi years, he was still present at some art exhibitions. Instead of following Nazi taste, Fiedler visited 1937 the Expo in Paris.

During World War II Kurt Fiedler served as translator in the prisoner of war camps at Dolní Jiřetín near Brüx and at Zeithain (Stalag IV-B), which was erected by French prisoners of war from 1940. He left the army in 1942 after political conflicts and because of poor health and earned his money with technical drawings at the Dresden University of Technology.

The Dürerbundhaus was completely destroyed during the bombing of Dresden in World War II on 13 February 1945. Fiedler's sister-in-law Fanny Schuchardt, who lived next-door, used the opportunity to hide. Her transport to a concentration camp was already scheduled for 16 February. She was among the very few Jews who survived The Holocaust in Dresden.

=== Post-war years ===
Kurt Fiedler and his family moved back to his parental home in Eichbusch. He belonged to the directorate of the association of fine arts (Verein bildender Künstler) in Dresden and was artistic staff member (künstlerischer Mitarbeiter) of the Saxon regional board of the Socialist Unity Party of Germany. The first action on occasion of re-establishing Dresden's association of graphic designers in October 1945 was the commemoration of Bruno Gimpel, a Jewish painter and former chairman of the graphic designers who was impelled to suicide by the Nazis. At the Socialist Unity Party Fiedler's rank was formally equal to that of Wilhelm Schubert from the former Communist Party of Germany, but like nearly all social democrats who became sidelined step by step he did not receive much appreciation that time, whereas Schubert was awarded the National Prize of East Germany.

== Artwork ==
=== Book illustrations ===
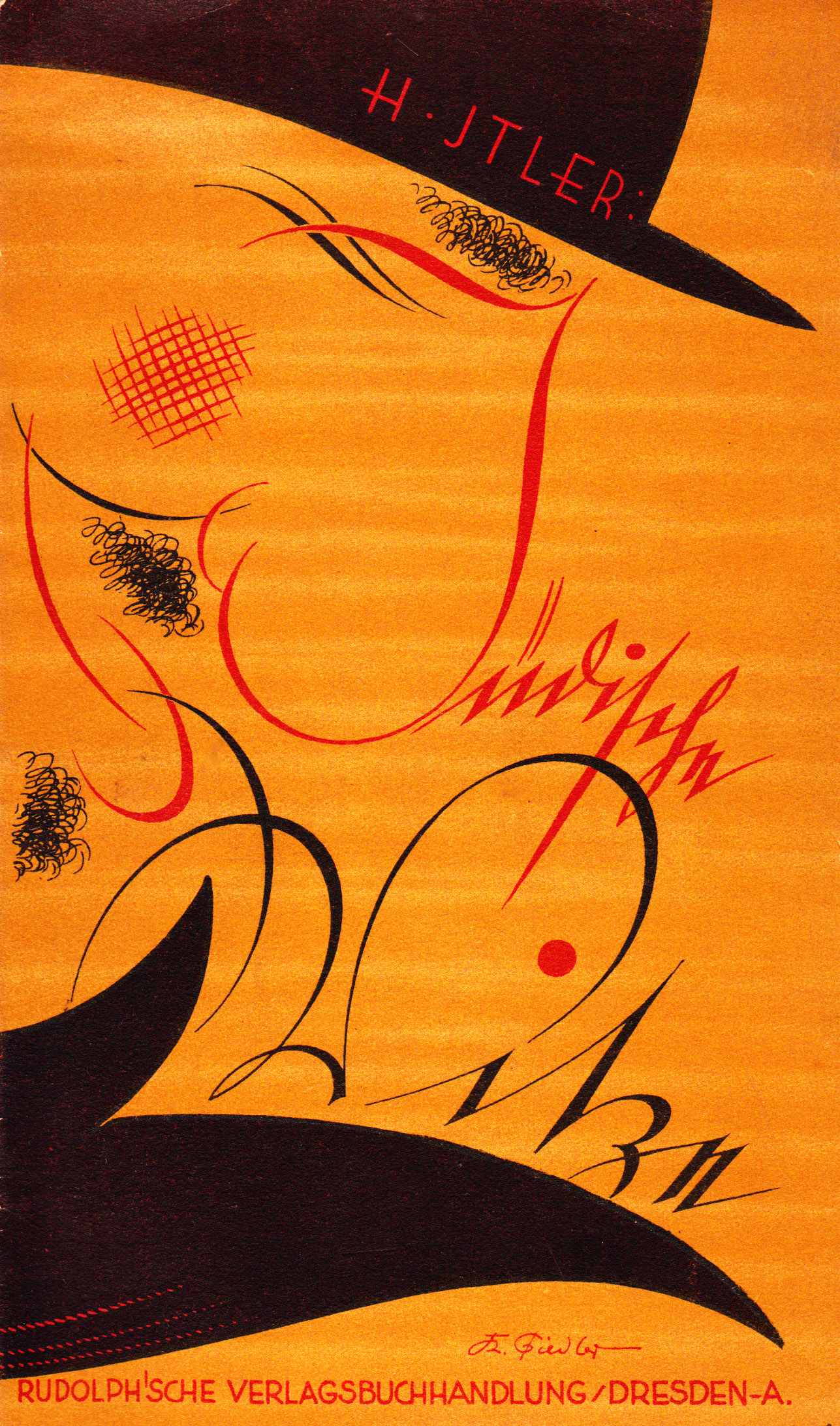
written by unknown author H. Itler, ironizing the later Nazi dictator

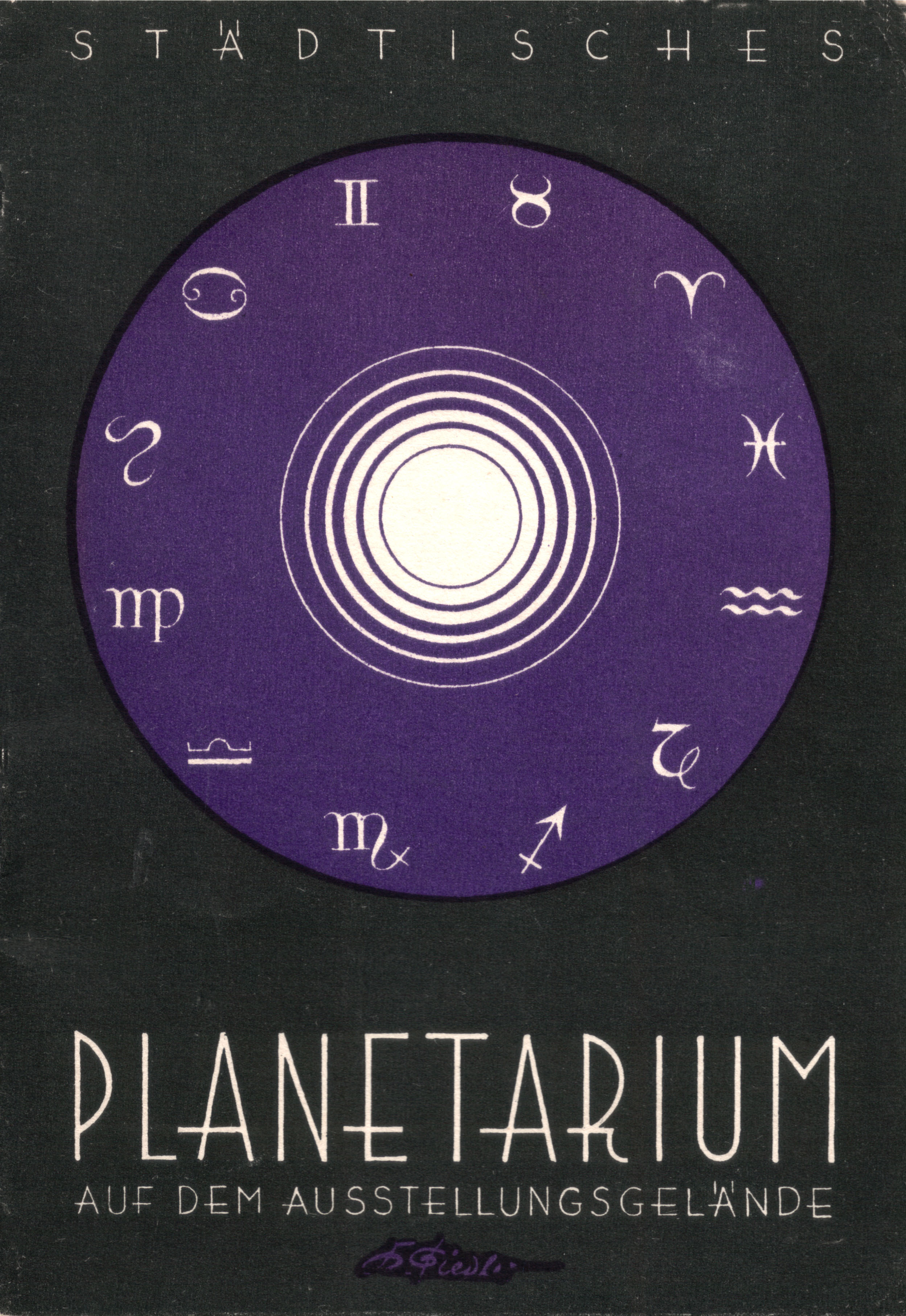
Dresden's planetarium

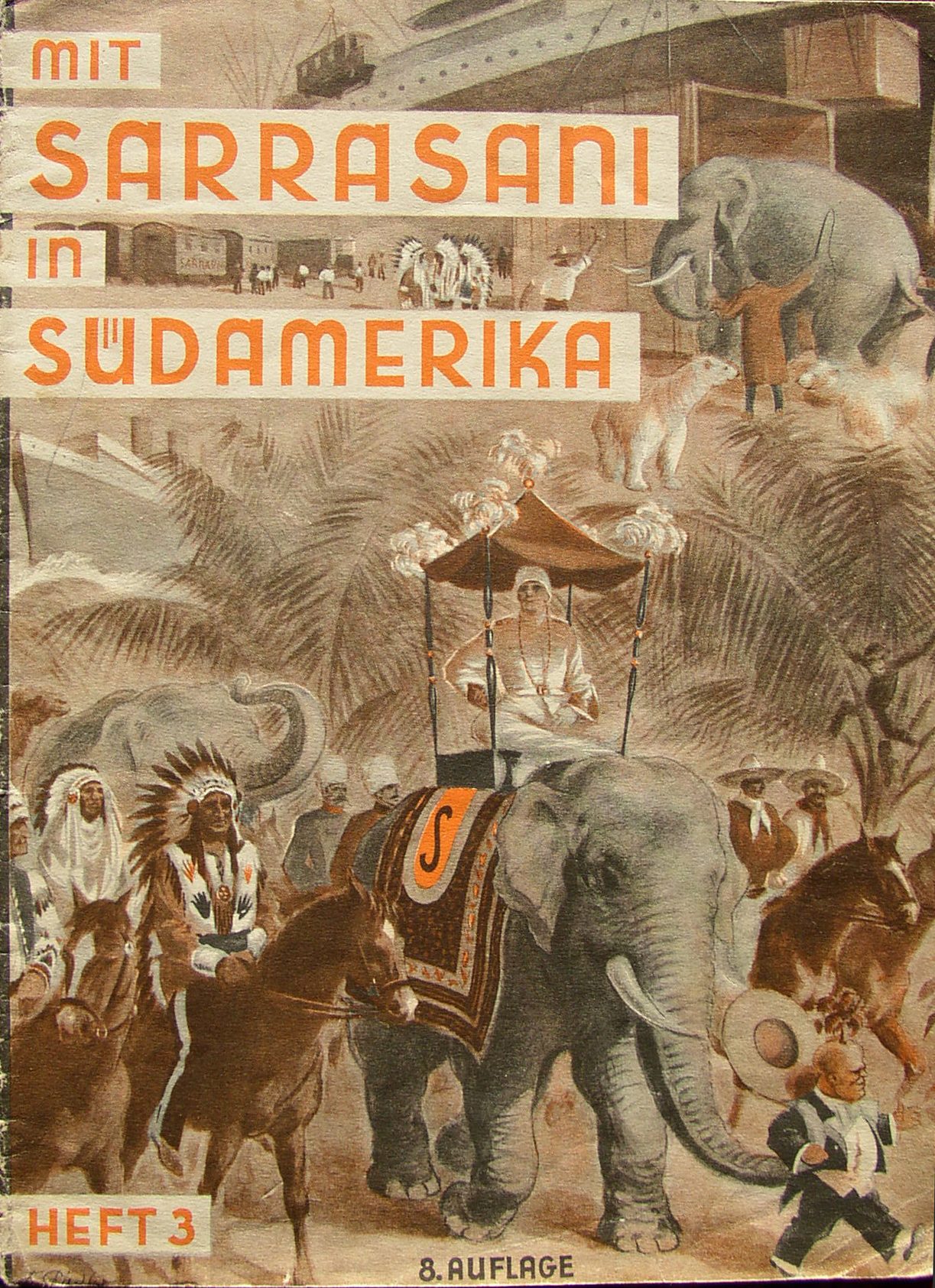
With Sarrasani in South America

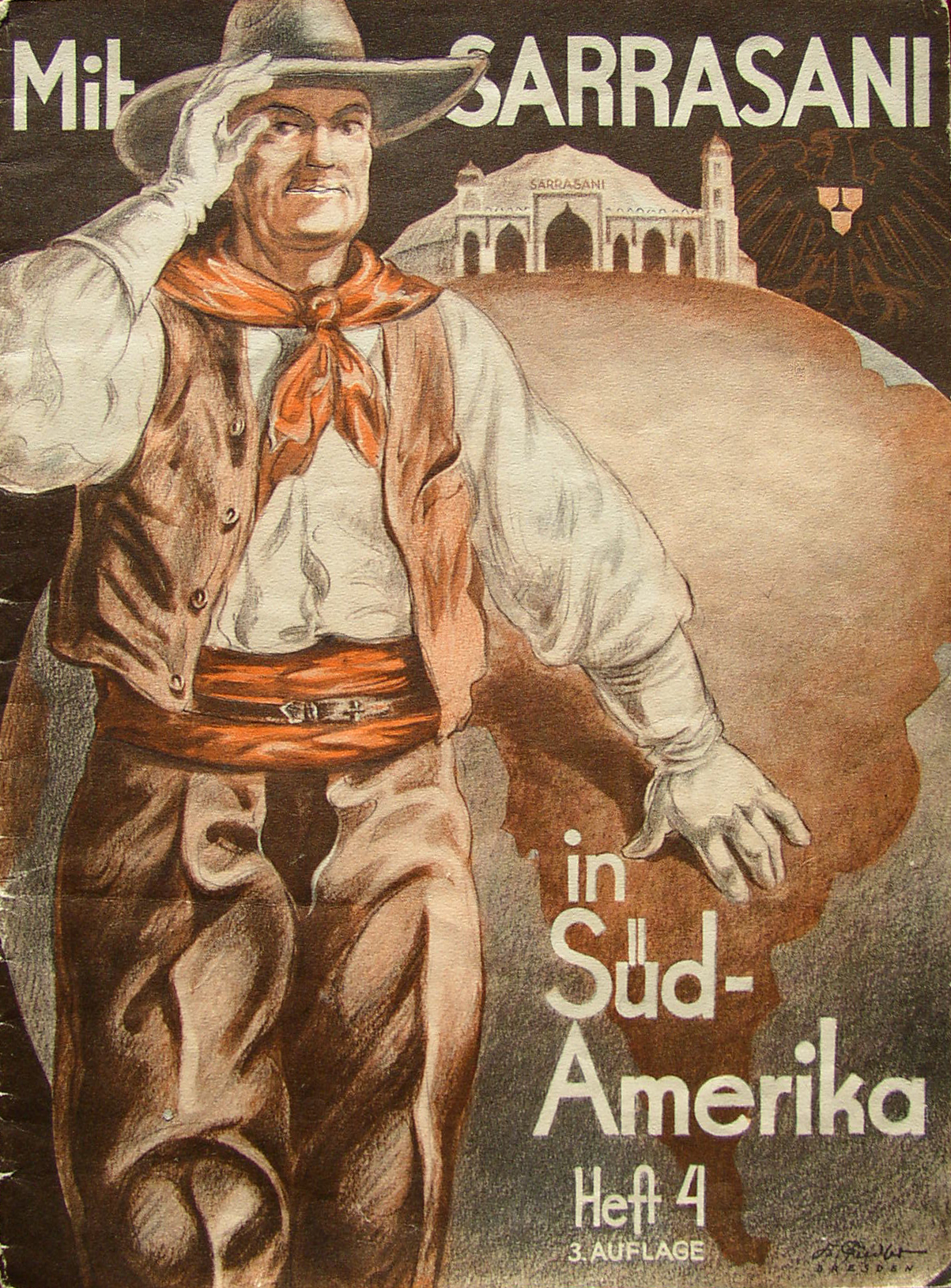
With Sarrasani in South America

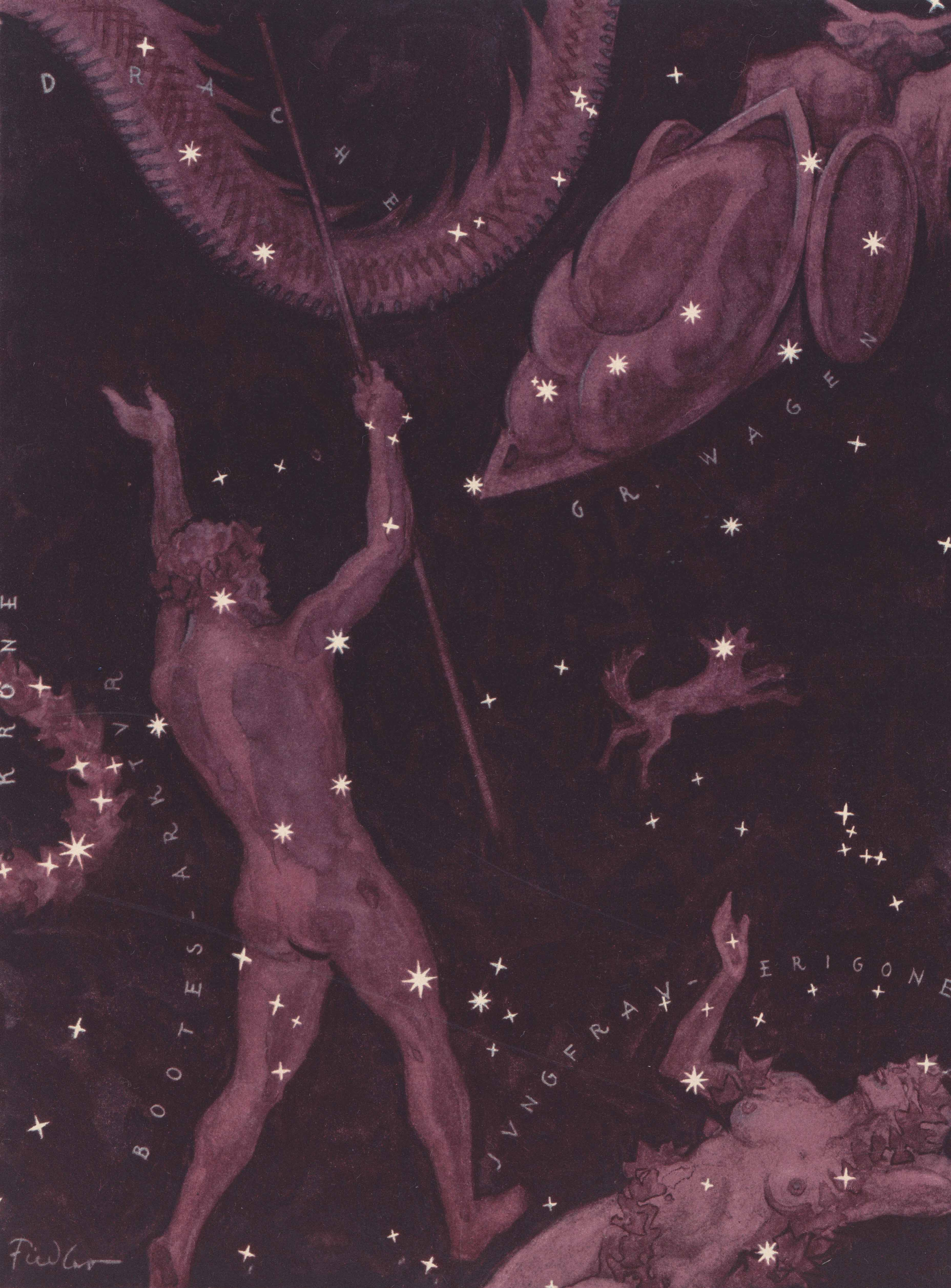
Das Sternbilder-Buch by Hermann Häfker

Fiedler was especially known for his cover illustrations of the adventure stories series Fahrten und Abenteuer (Travels and Adventures), edited by the director of the circus Sarrasani. It is estimated that this series, consisting of about 100 booklets, reached an overall edition of 10 million copies.

Together with Hermann Häfker, who later died in the Mauthausen-Gusen concentration camp, Fiedler created an astronomy book (Das Sternbilder-Buch) for the Dürerbund in 1926. It was part of the Dürerbund's ambition to distribute knowledge and evoke love of nature among the youth. In the same year, Dresden was one of the first cities to get a projection planetarium by Walther Bauersfeld (Zeiss model II) and Fiedler was selected for the promotion campaign. He designed posters and newspaper advertising, and illustrated two books by the director Kurd Kisshauer.

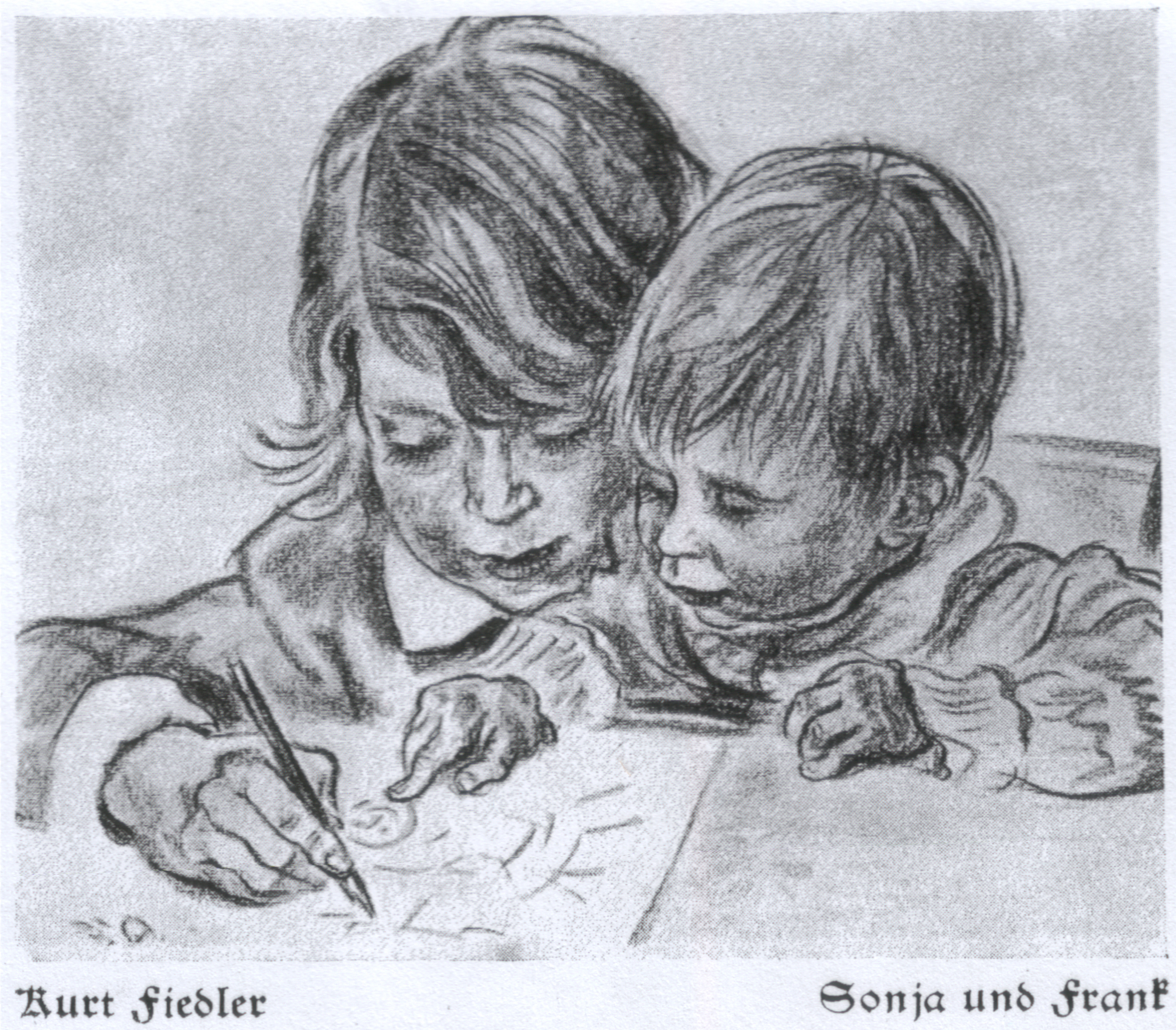
Art exhibition Brühl's Terrace 1933.

The publishing houses Steinkopff, Teubner, and Rudolph charged Fiedler with illustrations of textbooks and bookplates. Jüdische Witze (Jewish humor) was published in two editions (1928, 1930) by Rudolph under a pseudonym. Today, it is not known which author hid behind "H. Itler", an ironical reference the later Nazi dictator. Moreover, Fiedler designed various titles of Talisman-Bücherei, a successful series edited by Harry Winfield Bondegger and published by Rudolph, which was bound to the New Thought movement. Some books of this series were banned by the Nazis.

=== Advertising and drawings ===
Fiedler received an award on occasion of the World Advertising Congress 1929 in Berlin. Afterwards he became known for some of his drawings, especially of children. The tourism industry, Villeroy & Boch, Dresden's first newspaper, the Dresdner Anzeiger, e. g. with a poster on occasion of its 200th anniversary in 1930, and the German Cycling Federation belonged to his most important customers.

=== Socialist posters ===
Today, Fiedler is regarded as one of the leading poster artists of post-war East Germany. Many of his works can be found in Deutsches Historisches Museum, Academy of Arts, Berlin, Hoover Institution and the German Federal Archive. Among his best known pieces of that period is Junkerland in Bauernhand, a film poster designed for the DEFA, which is also part of a permanent exhibition in Haus der Geschichte in Bonn. The German national picture archive of arts at the University of Marburg documents 34 of his posters from this time.

=== Namesake ===
For many decades, Kurt Fiedler from Dresden had been confused with impressionist Kurt Fiedler (* 19 November 1878, Berlin). The latter became attached to many of the works of Dresden's Kurt Fiedler. This mistake can be traced back to Dresslers Kunsthandbuch of 1930, which confused the Dresden address with the life of Berlin's Kurt Fiedler, who lived from 1908 till at least 1943 at Bülowstraße 20. This confusion propagated even through later lexicons.

== See also ==
- List of Social Democratic Party of Germany politicians
- List of German painters
