= Hermann Häfker =

Hermann Wilhelm Häfker (3 June 1873, in Bremen – 27 December 1939, in the Concentration Camp Mauthausen) was an important film theoretician as well as an acknowledged Esperantist and writer.

Häfker published essential contributions to film theory. Like Sergei Eisenstein he saw film as a comprehensive artwork. Häfker is considered the most important representative of the film reform movement in Germany. He recognized early the cultural potential of cinema, but also the dangers of "low taste" resulting from commercial film production. His work can be seen as part of the aesthetic movement initiated by Deutscher Werkbund and Dürerbund.

During his years in Dresden, he was closely connected to Ferdinand Avenarius and his Dürerbund. He wrote popular books on history, sexual education, and science. His presumably most successful book, Das Sternbilder-Buch, contributed to educating the youth to love of stars and astronomy. Häfker created it in collaboration with graphic designer Kurt Fiedler for the Dürerbund. Häfker's Weltgeschichte in einem Band (World History in one Volume) was banned by the Nazis.

Because of his resistance against Nazi culture policy, they imposed Berufsverbot on Häfker. He fled 1936 to Prague, was brought to Dachau concentration camp after the German invasion and was murdered in the Concentration Camp Mauthausen.

== Works ==
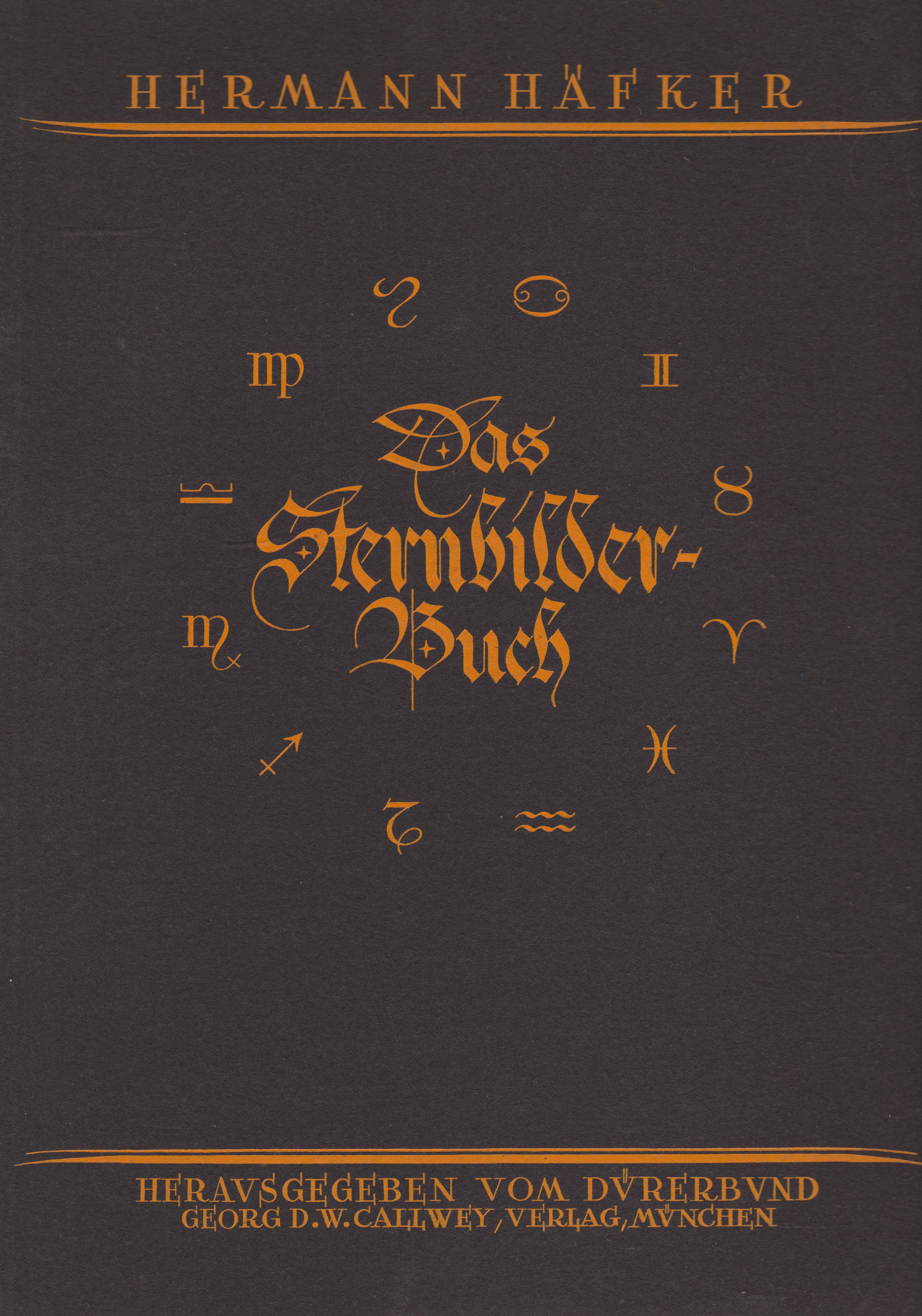
Das Sternbilder-Buch, edited by the Dürerbund and designed by Kurt Fiedler

- Kino und Kunst. Mönchengladbach: Volksvereins-Verlag 1913
- Kino und Erdkunde. Mönchengladbach: Volksvereins-Verlag 1914
- Die Aufgaben der Kinematographie in diesem Kriege. Munich: Callwey Verlag 1914
- Der Kino und die Gebildeten. Mönchengladbach: Volksvereins-Verlag 1915
- Gilgamesch. Eine Dichtung aus Babylon. in German by Hermann Häfker. Munich: Callwey 1924 (in the Open Library)
- Das Sternbilder-Buch. Ein Buch von Himmel und Weltanschauung. Munich: Callwey 1926
- Weltgeschichte in einem Band. Dresden: Kaden 1928
- Jarmiloj pasas. Universala historio. Verkita originale en Esperanto. Cologne: Heroldo de Esperanto 1930/31

== Literature ==
- Richard Abel (ed.): Encyclopedia of early cinema. London and New York: Routledge 2005
