= Hermann Glöckner =

German artist (1889–1987)

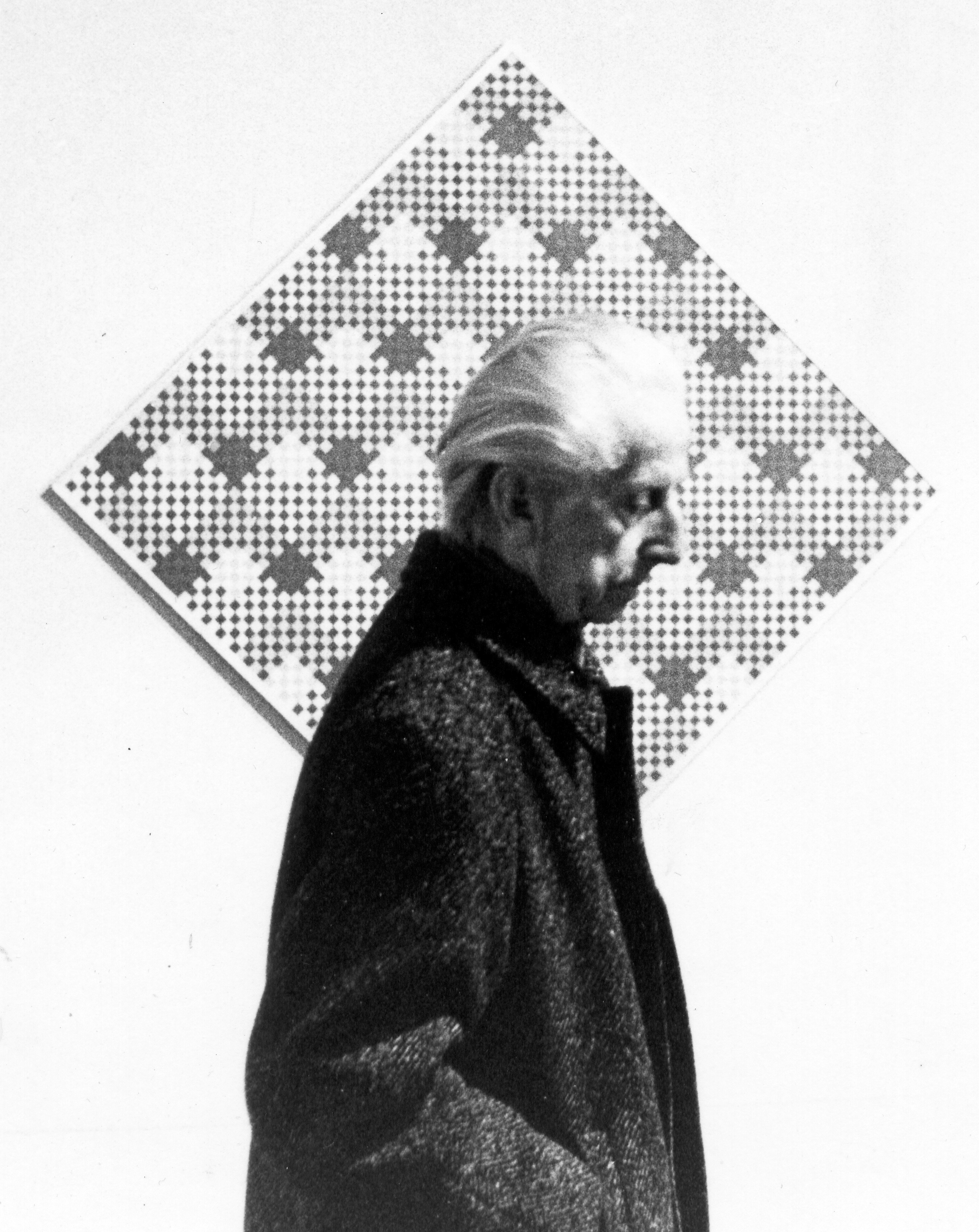
Hermann Glöckner in front of a work by Horst Bartnig in a private exhibition in Dresden in 1974

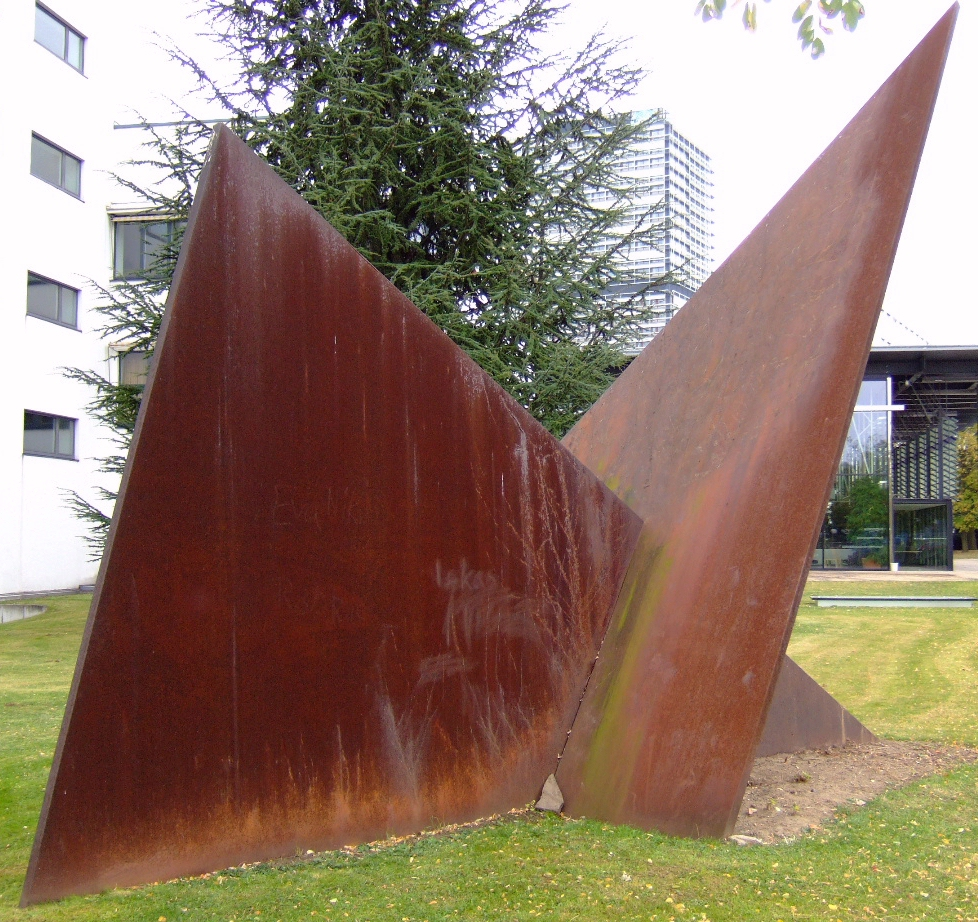
"Durchbruch" – plastic by Hermann Glöckner in front of the Bundeshaus Bonn

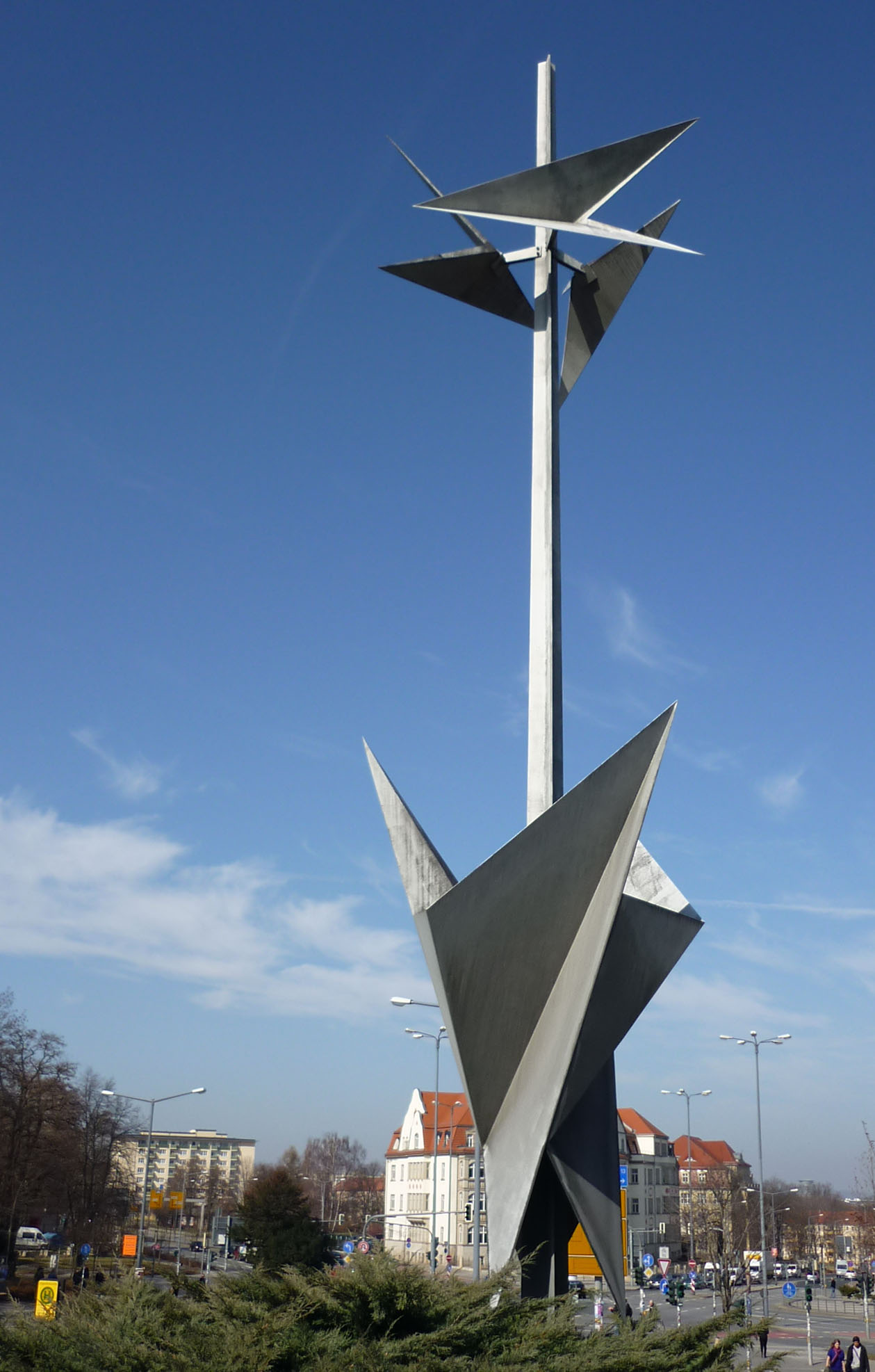
"Mast mit zwei Faltungszonen" – plastic by Hermann Glöckner, Technische Universität Dresden

Hermann Glöckner (21 January 1889 – 25 May 1987) was a German painter and sculptor. He was an important representative of constructivism.

Glöckner was born in Cotta near Dresden. He attended the vocational school in Leipzig in 1903 and worked as a designer for textiles. From 1904 to 1911 he attended the evening classes at the Kunstgewerbeschule in Dresden, where he became friends with Kurt Fiedler. Among their lectures were Oskar Seyffert and Carl Rade, who later was a renowned professor at the Dresden Academy of Fine Arts and remained a friend of Glöckner for many years. Glöckner was mainly interested in drawings, but also in projections and geometry. From 1914 to 1918 he served in infantry divisions in France, Russia, and Poland.

After World War I, Glöckner earned some money with the copying of paintings for the Gemäldegalerie Alte Meister. At the Dresden Academy of Fine Arts he studied with Otto Gussmann from 1923 to 1924. Hans Grundig was among his fellow students. His experimental style, however, did not find everyone's appreciation and Glöckner left the academy again. As a freelancer he turned to constructivism ever deeper during the following years. In 1932 he became a member of the re-founded Dresdner Sezession. The Nazis refused him any opportunities to exhibit and sell his paintings and graphics. So he turned to sgraffito to earn his living.

Glöckner lost his home during the bombing of Dresden in World War II and moved to Loschwitz. Because of his formalist style, the officials of the GDR refused him the appreciation he deserved for a long time. His rehabilitation began with an exhibition of his graphical work in the Kupferstichkabinett, Dresden in 1969. In 1979 he received a permanent visa for the Federal Republic of Germany. Finally, in 1984, he was awarded with the National Prize of the GDR and the DEFA dedicated a film to him. Centrally in the area of the Technische Universität Dresden he was allowed to erect a sculpture, which had been banned just a few years before. Another sculpture was erected one year later in the park of the Hotel Bellevue, Dresden's first address that time.

In his later years Glöckner regularly visited West Berlin, where his cohabitee lived and where he died in 1987. Glöckner's urn was entombed in Loschwitz. A street in Loschwitz, newly built in 2008, is named after him.

== Works ==
Glöckner made his works from objects he had on hand: twine, cardboard, match boxes, and wood scrapes. These common objects were put together in a unique way to create something entirely new. This art was private with the only audience being his wife.

== See also ==
- List of German painters
