= Callwey Verlag =

German publishing house

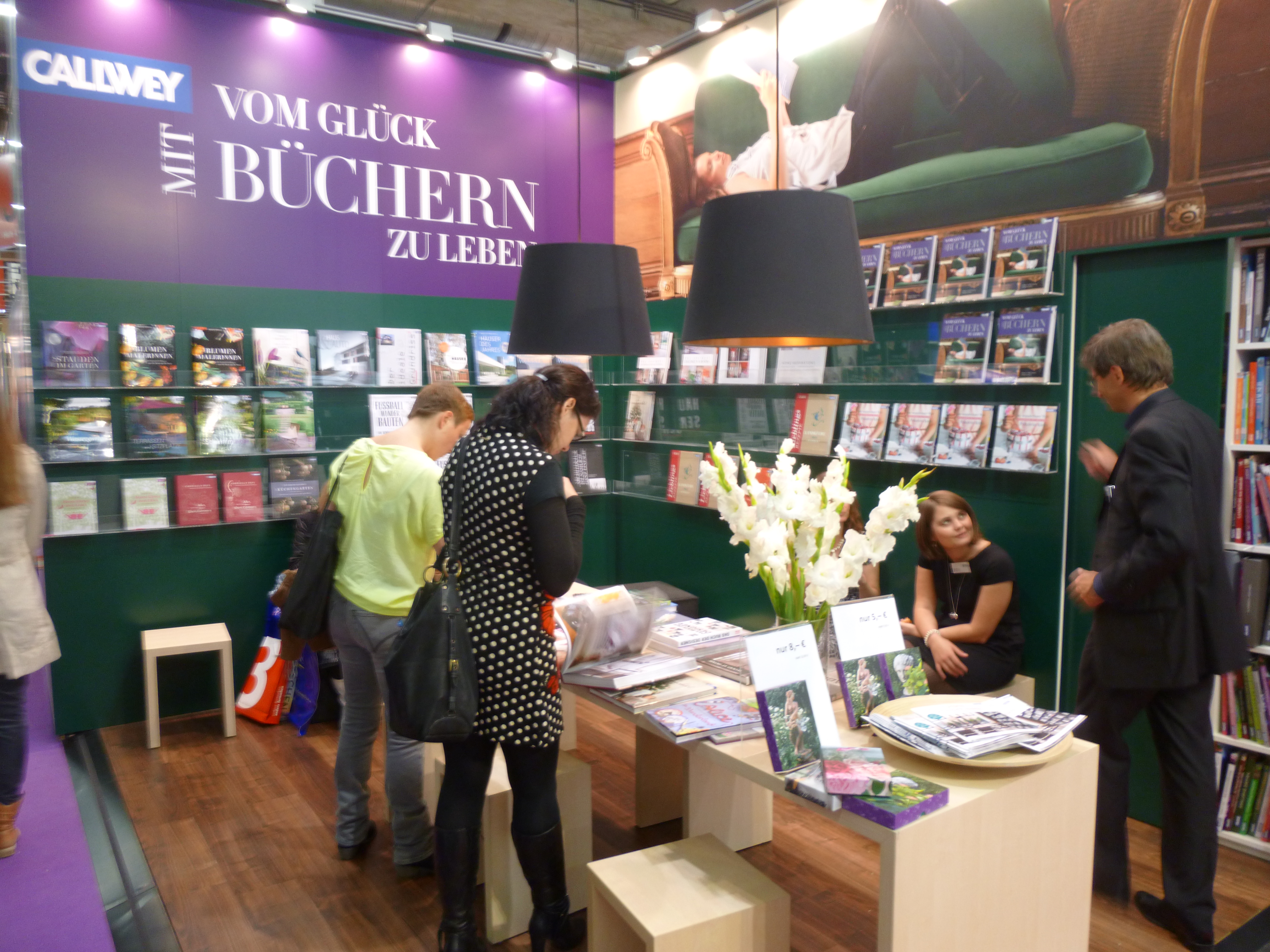
- Founded: 1884
- Founder: Georg D.W. Callwey
- Country of origin: Germany
- Headquarters location: Munich
- Fiction genres: Structural engineering and architecture
- Official website: www.callwey.de

The Callwey Verlag is a German publishing house with the main focus on structural engineering and architecture.

== History ==
The publishing house was founded in 1884 in Munich by Georg D.W. Callwey. Callwey published books based on the subjects of planning and design around the house, lifestyle, living, design, architecture, landscape architecture, crafts and restoration. They offered an extensive book program on the subjects of building, housing, gardening and cooking, and various journals about the field of architecture and craft such as "Der Baumeister" (The Builder), "Garten und Landschaft" (Garden and Landscape), "Topos", "Die Mappe" (The Folder), "Stein" (Stone) and "Restauro". In addition, they offered digital products, events, awards, symposia, yearbooks and services of corporate publishing.

Callwey Verlag gained national prominence when Ferdinand Avenarius took over 50% of the stakes in the magazine "Der Kunstwart", in 1894, which was at that time an important publication of the middle bourgeoisie. Avenarius and Callwey made an important contribution to the cultural history leading to the beginning of the World War I in 1914. Their writings, many published for the "Dürerbund", had a great influence on the education of youth, especially students and elementary school teachers. They were attributed to the Lebensreform movement.

In 1996, the Laterna Magica Publisher was taken over, where they had specialized in books on the practice of photography. The program has now been set.

The Callwey Verlag is run by the fourth generation of the Baur-Callwey family.

== Publications ==
The company is one of the leading architecture publishers in German in the topic areas of construction, planning and design, renovation and restoration. From the beginning, both books and journals were published. In total, eight magazines are published. In the field of structural engineering Callwey publishes the titles

- Mappe,
- Baumeister,
- Stein.

For the field of landscape architecture, the publisher offers the "Topos" titles (four issues per year in English) and "Garten + Landschaft" (monthly in German) among other journals. The trade magazine for restorers and artisans "Restauro" also appears 8 times a year.

In book publishing, approximately 40 new releases are published per year. Licenses are sold worldwide, including in the United States and Japan.
