= Karl Ernst Krafft =

Swiss astrologer (1900–1945)

Karl Ernst Krafft (10 May 1900 – 8 January 1945) was a Swiss astrologer, born in Basel. He worked in the fields of astrology and graphology.

== Astrology career ==
After studying in the University of Basel and Geneva, he graduated with a degree in mathematics. For the best part of ten years he worked on a massive book entitled Traits of Astro-Biology. This expounded his own theory of "Typocosmy": the prediction of the future based on the study of an individual's personality, or type. Krafft opened an office in Zürich, where he provided horoscopes and investment advice. Krafft's business collapsed, as did and his own investments (which were decided via divination).

By the early 1930s, when Adolf Hitler had come to power, Krafft enjoyed a unique status among occultists and prophets in Germany. The National Socialists, later to become his patrons, at first posed a threat to him. Occultists, like Freemasons, were among those harassed and vilified by most National Socialists. While the Nazi state persecuted astrologers, Rudolf Hess and Heinrich Himmler consulted them. Krafft moved to Germany at the invitation of the Nazis and was endorsed by the Ministry of Propaganda. Krafft subsequently joined the Nazi Party and introduced anti-Semitic ideas into his work. Krafft moved into the orbit of the National Socialist elite in November 1939 when he made a remarkable prediction. He predicted that the Führer's life would be in danger between 7 and 10 November. He wrote, on 2 November to a friend, Dr Heinrich Fesel, who worked for Himmler, warning him of an attempt on Hitler's life. Fesel filed the letter away, unwillingly to become enmeshed in something dangerous.

On 8 November, a bomb exploded at the Munich beer hall. There were many injuries but the target, Hitler, was unscathed because he left the assembly in the hall a few minutes before the explosion. When newspapers reported the near-catastrophe Fesel dispatched a telegram to Hess, drawing attention to Krafft's prediction. Krafft was arrested and brought to Gestapo Headquarters in Berlin. Krafft's proclamation of exacting astrological rules managed to convince the Gestapo that astrology enabled its practitioners to make accurate forecasts of future events resulting in now being employed by the Nazi Propaganda Ministry, the SS and even the Foreign Office to carry out astrological studies of a political nature. After his release he was summoned to the Reich Propaganda ministry, run by Joseph Goebbels. Goebbels had recently taken to poring over Nostradamus, trying to squeeze propaganda from the prophecies. Krafft, he felt, should work on deciphering the cryptic quatrains. Krafft began work on a pro-German evaluation of Nostradamus.

Krafft was convinced that the prophecies of Nostradamus boded well for the Third Reich. Tens of thousands of pamphlets based upon his interpretations of the quatrains were translated and circulated in six languages: French (translated by Krafft himself), Danish, Hungarian, Portuguese, Romanian and Spanish and he soon came to the attention of the Führer. In the spring of 1940 he gave a private horoscope reading for Hitler to an aide, but he never met his leader.

British intelligence became so concerned at the thought that their opponent's war was being conducted by a mystic that they, for a time, hired the services of astrologer Louis De Wohl. De Wohl was quietly dropped after several months, having failed to procure any hard evidence about Krafft's work.

Krafft warned the Reich leaders that for victory to be certain, the war must end for Germany in 1943. Krafft's star was still in the ascendancy when Rudolf Hess made his astonishing flight to Scotland in 1941. Hitler was outraged. Hess was the biggest occult supporter of them all. Hitler ordered a purge of astrologers, occultists and other sages. Krafft was caught up in this. He worked on horoscopes of Allied generals and admirals, having informal contacts with Kurd Kisshauer and Amt Rosenberg. One of his predictions when seeing the charts of both Erwin Rommel and Bernard Montgomery, adversaries in the desert war, was: "Well this man Montgomery's chart is certainly stronger than Rommel's."

== Later life ==
Krafft was arrested on 12 June 1941, as part of a crackdown on astrologers, faith healers and occultists following Rudolf Hess's flight to Scotland. He was released in 1943 and set back to propaganda work, but the integrity of his forecasts soon told against him. Krafft's bitter complaints at the demeaning work he was expected to do, led to his rearrest in 1944. He was held in poor conditions, caught typhus and eventually died on 8 January 1945 en route to Buchenwald concentration camp.

== See also ==
- Nazi mysticism
