= Wolfgang Schumann (1887–1964) =

German author (1887–1964)

Wolfgang Schumann (22 August 1887 in Dresden – 22 April 1964 in Freital) was a German writer and journalist.

Wolfgang was the son of Paul Schumann and the stepson of Ferdinand Avenarius. Both of these father figures had played a role in setting up the Dürerbund, a leading cultural organisation in Germany. His grandfather, Rudolf Doehn was a veteran Forty-Eighter who had fought in the American Civil War.

Schumann worked closely with Otto Neurath at the Deutsches Kriegswirtschaftsmuseum (German Museum of War Economy) in Leipzig. In December 1918, they both joined Hermann Kranold to produce the Programm Kranold-Neurath-Schumann whilst in Saxony. All three subsequently went to Bavaria, where Neurath was appointed President of the Central Economic Administration for the Bavarian Soviet Republic. However, Schumann soon left with the other Social Democrats.

== Works ==
- Das Schrifttum der Gegenwart und der Krieg, Flugschrift des Dürerbundes 137, München: Callwey, 1915
- Unser Deutschtum und der Fall Spitteler: Belege und Betrachtungen, Flugschrift zur Ausdruckskultur 135, München: Callwey, 1915
- Reform und Sozialisierung der Tagespresse, Flugschrift des Dürerbundes 183, München: Callwey, 1919
- Über den Dürerbund; Bemerkungen über Geschichte, Wesen u. Aufgabe d. Dürerbundes, München: Callwey, 1919
- Zur Volkshochschulfrage: Bemerkungen und Vorschläge vornehmlich über städtische Volkshochschuleinrichtungen nebst e. krit. Übers. über d. neuere Literatur, Flugschrift des Dürerbundes 184, München: Callwey, 1921
- Schauspielkunst und Schauspieler, Flugschriften des Dürerbundes 200, München: Callwey, 1926
- Geschlechtlichkeit und Liebe, Kunstwart-Bücherei 50, München: Callwey, 1928
