= Corps Guestphalia Halle =

Student association in Saxony-Anhalt, Germany

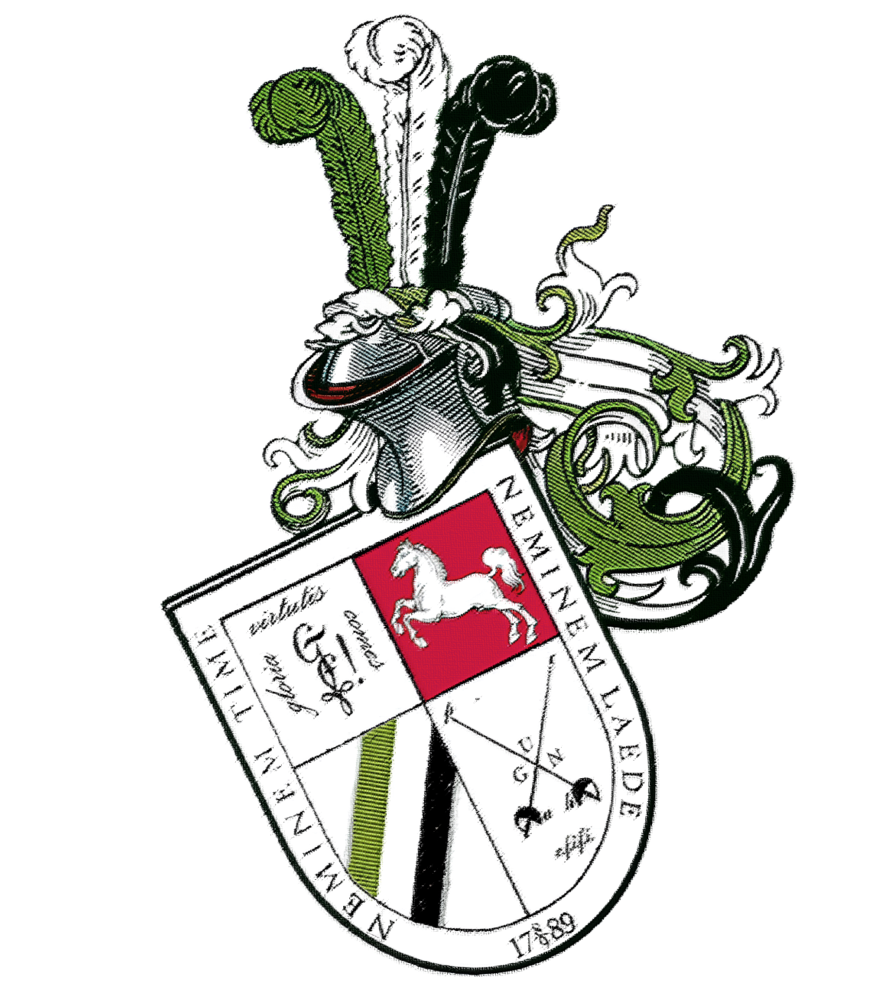
- Founded: 18 July 1840; 186 years ago In 1926 the founding date was backdated to a table society ("Kränzchen"; "nation") that had arisen in 1789 or 1790, whose founding date was arbitrarily fixed as 8 September 1789; University of Halle
- Type: German Student Corps
- Affiliation: KSCV
- Status: Active
- Scope: Local
- Motto: Neminem time, neminem laede! Gloria virtutis comes!
- Colors: Green–White–Black
- Headquarters: Burgstrasse 40; Halle/Saale, Saxony-Anhalt 06114; Germany
- Website: guestphalia-halle.de

The Corps Guestphalia Halle is a German Student Corps, founded in 1840 at the United Friedrich University of Halle-Wittenberg and affiliated with the Kösener Seniors Convent Association (KSCV). Its members are known as" Hallenser Westfalen" – "Halle Westphalians". Like all Corps within the KSCV, Guestphalia upholds the principles of Mensur, Couleur and lifelong fraternity; within the KSCV it belongs to the "Green Circle". From 1958 to 2006 the Corps was based in Münster, North Rhine-Westphalia, before returning in the summer semester of 2006 to Halle/Saale, where it has since once again been affiliated with the Halle Seniors' Convent.

The Corps is best known for its claim to be the oldest German Student Corps. This status, however, is based on the backdating of its foundation to 8 September 1789, approved by the Halle SC in 1926. There is, however, no evidence of continuity with an earlier association of the same name.

== Coat of arms and couleur ==
Guestphalia's colors are May green–white–black with silver trim; the cap is May green. Freshmen (germ. "Füchse" = engl. "foxes") wear a May green–white–May green Fuchsenband, also silver-trimmed. In winter, a felt winter cap with embroidered monogram (germ. "Zirkel") and ermine trim replaces the usual cap. Inactive members and alumni wear a Tönnchen. The Corps' mottoes are Neminem time, neminem laede! and Gloria virtutis comes!; the arms motto – abbreviated GUN, a.p.h.c., v.f.i.f.i. – reads Amico pectus hosti cuspidem, Vivant fratres intimo foedere iuncti! Since the early 20th century, the escutcheon has been quartered: (1) argent, the Corps cipher with Gloria virtutis comes; (2) gules, a rearing Westphalian horse, argent; (3) tierced in the Corps colors, inscribed Neminem time, neminem laede and the date 1789; (4) argent, two sabres in saltire with the arms mottoes. The crest above the helm shows three ostrich feathers in the Corps colors. The earlier coat of arms was also quartered but differently: eight mullets for the founders, the Guelph horse, the Westphalian colors and the founding date 1840 flanked by "XVIII" and "VII," with a small inescutcheon bearing the cipher at center.

== History of the Corps ==
=== Early period (1840–1914) ===
The origins of Westphalian associations in Halle can be traced back to the early eighteenth century, when, amid the unrest of 1717, students began organizing along regional lines and formed a Westphalian Landsmannschaft ("natio") for mutual protection. A royal edict issued that same year prohibited such associations. There is no evidence, however, of their covert continuation; only sporadic revivals in 1765 and 1786 point to the persistence of a distinct Westphalian regional consciousness. A new institutional framework emerged from 1777 in the Constantinist Order (a student lodge patterned on the Masonic model), whose internal tensions in 1789/90 gave rise to an independent Westphalian landsmannschaft – the present corps regards this association as its origin. The founding date subsequently claimed for 8 September 1789, however, rests on no documentary evidence whatsoever. A chain of short-lived re-foundings ensued: after its dissolution in 1813, a Teutonia (1814–1817), a General Burschenschaft under the name Guestphalia/Germania (1818/19), renewed foundings in 1819, 1825, and 1835/36 – none demonstrably connected to one another. The immediate precursor was the so-called "Cannibals" society, formed in 1837/38 from the last remaining Westphalians together with a group of Heidelberg students, out of which a short-lived Guestphalia in green-silver-black emerged – again without continuity to what preceded it.

In 1840 six students at the University of Halle-Wittenberg – five theologians and one law student, from the provinces of Saxony, Anhalt and Mecklenburg – joined together to found a student association. After an attempt to recruit a member of Borussia Corps had failed, they won over the law student Viktor Pfannschmidt (Corps Thuringia Jena), who constituted the Corps Guestphalia on 18 July 1840; the choice of name over "Pommerania" probably goes back to him. On 6 August 1840 it was admitted to the Hallenser SC as the youngest Corps alongside Saxonia, Borussia and Marchia. It was demonstrably a new foundation without continuity with earlier student associations of the same name – shown by the necessary fencing out "Herauspauken," the non-participation of old-Westphalians, and the later statement in the SC-Comment of 1853 that it was a "new Corps [...], but independent of the previous one." A reconstitution would, in any case, have been impossible under §7.4 of the then applicable SC-Comment, since more than one year had elapsed since the dissolution of the last Guestphalia (1819/38).

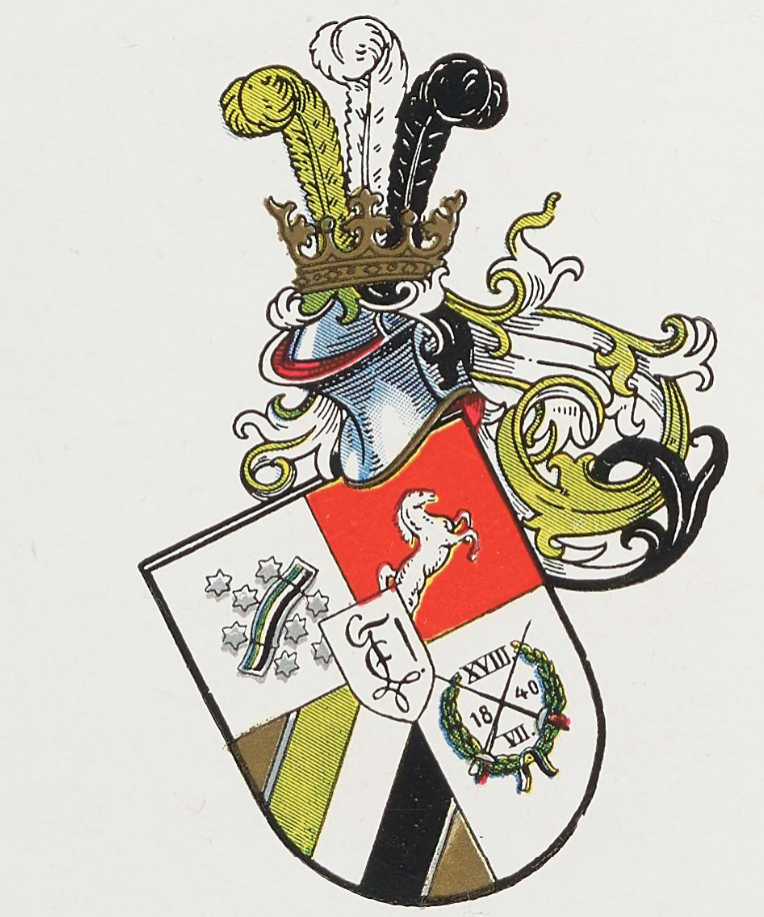
The old Corps coat of arms prior to the backdating of the Student Corps

In the following decades the Corps experienced several upheavals. In 1843/44 a split in the SC occurred; Guestphalia stood on one side together with Saxonia and the new Pomerania, before the Corps reunited in 1844. In 1848 Guestphalia took part in the Jena Seniors' Convent Deputies' Assembly, and in 1855 in the founding of the KSCV. Under the German Empire the Corps concluded cartel relations with Hansea Bonn, Marchia Berlin, Borussia Greifswald and Hasso-Borussia. Repeated it became involved in conflicts: in 1862, a dispute with Halle journeymen escalated in the run-up to the planned torchlight procession on the occasion of the reactor replacement at the university. Violent street battles ensued in which members of Guestphalia were taking part as ringleaders. The instigators were severely punished by the university authorities. In 1867 the dispute over the anniversary of the University of Halle-Wittenberg led to a temporary ban on the Hallenser Corps. The corps had expected preferential treatment during the university's anniversary celebrations. When this did not occur, the Corps members brutally attacked the festive procession led by the university director and prevented the groupe from entering the banquet hall, compelling the organizers to move the event to another location.

In 1870 the Corps suspended activity because of the German-French war, reconstituted in 1874, and at the end of the 1870s moved from the Black Circle to the Green Circle. In 1888 it acquired its first dedicated Corps house, and in 1911 the new building at Burgstrasse 40 followed.

=== War, political radicalization and the construction of tradition (1914–1933) ===
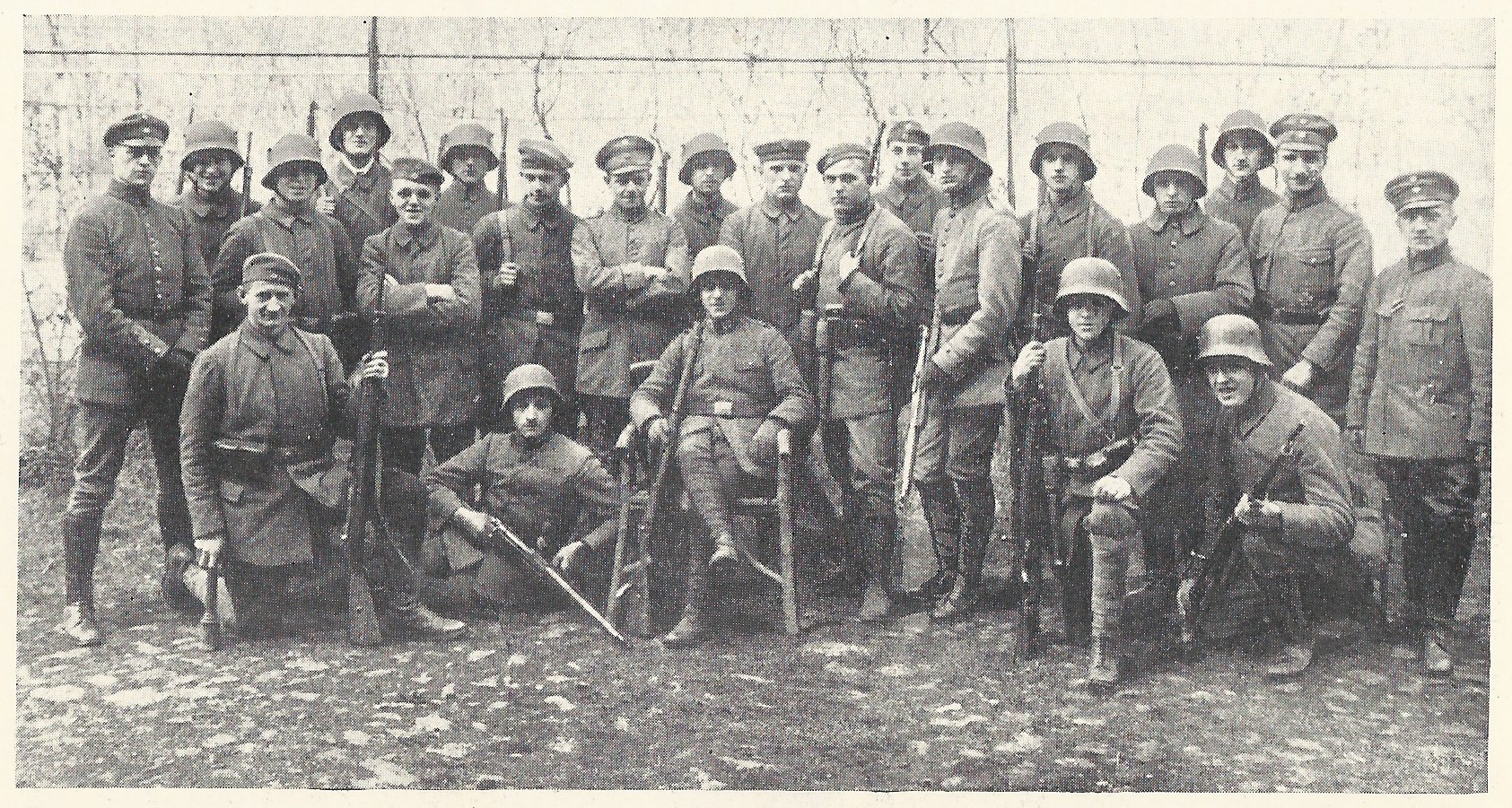
Corps students from Halle as Freikorps militiamen during the occupation of Giebichenstein Castle in March 1920

During the First World War, association life came to a complete standstill from 1916 to 1918. During the revolutionary period, the active members joined volunteer melitias as a body and took part in suppressing workers' uprisings in Halle. These events placed a lasting strain on relations between students and the Halle working class. In the early 1920s, Guestphalia joined the völkisch, antisemitic Hochschulring Deutscher Art, and from 1920 onward refused dueling satisfaction to the Jewish student association Albingia Halle on antisemitic grounds.

Today, Guestphalia is best known for being regarded as the oldest German student Corps. This status, however, rests on a retrospective backdating of its foundation date. Guestphalia's case must be understood against the backdrop of a broader trend within the KSCV. From around 1910 onward, requests to backdate Corps foundation dates became increasingly common, eventually overwhelming the responsible delegates' assembly of the oKC, which approved more than thirty such requests without subjecting them to thorough scrutiny. In 1919, the Corps-historian and archivist Wilhelm Fabricius warned that similar practices in other student umbrella organization could undermine the German Corps' claims to precedence and proposed measures to counter this danger. He advocated a more systematic promotion of the backdating of Corps foundation dates, arguing that, ideally, all German student Corps should seek to establish an earlier date of foundation. Consequently, a Permanent Backdating Commission was established, although it was granted only an advisory role. In 1920, decision-making authority was transferred to the regional Senior Convents, while the oKC was to be consulted only in cases where a request for backdating was rejected.

In 1926, journalist and Guestphalia member Ernst Hammer (died 1940) applied to the Backdating Commission. Chaired by Wilhelm Fabricius, it approved backdating Guestphalia to 1792 after only a cursory review. Halle SC then had Corps-historian Gustav Gotthilf Winkel examine the memorandum – a one-day assessment, necessarily superficial – and approved backdating to 1789, albeit with an explicit reservation concerning the historical reliability of the evidence submitted.

Not until 1927 did the oKC address the events in Halle, prompted by the Corps Onoldia, which until then had been regarded as the oldest German Corps. While it acknowledged the SC's formal authority to decide the matter, it nevertheless set up a special commission under the lawyer Weber. By 1929, this commission had concluded that the submitted was untenable and had, in part, been deliberately forged by Guestphalia to create the appearance of historical continuity. Despite this, the same commission – whose membership overlapped considerably with that of the Permanent Backdating Commission – approved the backdating again in 1930. The Historical Commission, the Statutes Commission and Onoldia lodged sharp protests with the oKC; the minutes of the meeting were never published. An expert opinion by the independent historian Kurt Rheindorf dismissed the reasoning in 1930 as methodologically untenable, but it was never presented to the oKC. The years-long, publicly conducted dispute, which had severely damaged the reputation of the German student Corps as a whole and tied up immense financial resources, led to a fundamental rethink within the KSCV: backdatings were henceforth regarded as fundamentally undesirable and future proceedings were, moreover, to be financed by the applicant itself; the Permanent Backdating Commission was dissolved. An attempt undertaken in 1953 to revise the decision retroactively by the historical commission ultimately failed due to the resistance of the Corps Onoldia, which refused to submit a corresponding motion.

The Halle Student Corps, together with the student associations of a different kind, were increasingly pushed onto the defensive by the NSDStB (National Socialist German Students' League). Its victory in the May 1931 AStA election gave it an absolute majority and enabled it to assert its claim to leadership within the student body.

=== Guestphalia under National Socialism (1933–1945) ===
With the National Socialist regime, the situation of the Corps deteriorated considerably. In 1933 the Halle Corps initially welcomed the seizure of power with enthusiasm; from the summer semester of 1933 onward, compulsory military sports and membership in a military association became mandatory. In 1934 compulsory labor service and the führer-principle were added. In the 1933/34 "Aryan survey", Guestphalia stated that it had neither non-Aryan members nor members related by marriage to Jews. Following the order issued by Viktor Lutze on 25 September 1935 and the dissolution of the KSCV, Guestphalia suspended itself on 11 October 1935 and sold the Corps house in order to preempt confiscation. In 1938 the NS-comradeship Gustav Nachtigal was formed at the House of Palaiomarchia, in which bigger parts of Guestphalia's alumnis also took part. The internal organization of the comradship adhered closely to the model statutes of the NSDStB. Around 1942, the comradschip underwent a transformation toward a structure resembling that of a traditional student associations. This development was driven primarily by the new comradschip regulations issued by the RSF, although it may also have been influenced by the Leipzig comradschip Markgraf von Meissen. Unlike comparable developments elsewhere, however, this transformation was accompanied by an explicit rejection of ritual fencing, traditionally used to determine membership. Under pressure from the NSDStB, the building was later the student association as its property. In 1944 it was dissolved by the NSDStB; officially due to lack of interest my its members. The furnishings of the Corps house were placed in storage elsewhere but were largely lost owing to the war, as were large parts of the Corps-archive.

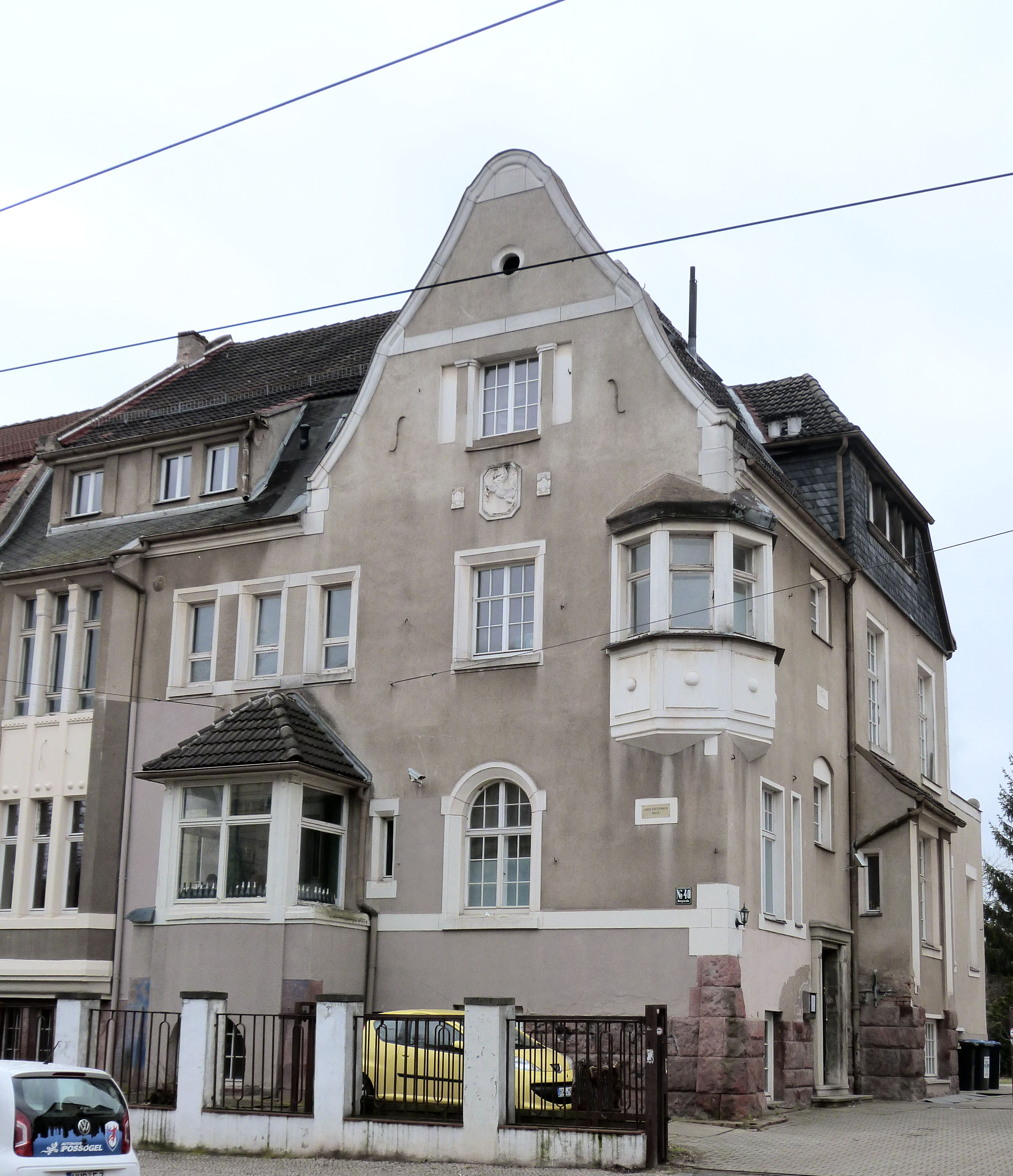
The Guestphalia Corps house at Burgstraße 40, built in 1911, repurchased in the 2000s

=== Reconstitution and the postwar development of the Corps (from 1945) ===
After 1945 a post-war Corps-newspaper kept the alumnis together; in 1949 several Halle Corps jointly founded the Corps Saxonia in Frankfurt, from which Guestphalia separated again in 1956. In 1958 an independent reconstitution was achieved in Münster with the support of Rheno-Guestphalia. In the 1970s, Guestphalia supported compulsory Mensur in the so-called 'duelling question', leading to a rupture with Hansea, which opposed it. In 1980, Guestphalia once again assumed the KSCV Vorort. In 2006 the Corps returned to Halle and, after missing the deadline for restitution claims, bought back its Corps house sold in 1935. In 2021/22 Guestphalia took over the KSCV Vorort for the third time.

== External relations ==
Guestphalia belongs to the Green Circle. It is in cartel relations with Saxonia Leipzig and maintains friendly relations with Holsatia, Albertina, Borussia Breslau, Teutonia Gießen and Pomerania; since the summer semester of 2019 there has also been an official relations of presentation with Rhenania Würzburg.

== Notable members ==
- Hans Bodo Graf von Alvensleben-Neugattersleben (1920, honorary member, formerly Bonner Preuße), 1882–1961, estate owner and President of the German Herrenklub
- Robert von Bartsch (1853), 1833–1919, Undersecretary of State
- Gustav Behrendt (1877), 1859–1912, President of the Berlin Railway Directorate
- Gustav Bertog (1845), 1825–1888, estate and factory owner, chairman of the town council in Halberstadt, Member of the Prussian House of Representatives
- Richard Wilhelm Bertram (1848, honorary member), 1828–1881, Mayor of Halle/Saale
- Gisbert von Bonin-Brettin (1867), 1841–1913, Saxe-Coburg and Gotha Privy Councillor and Minister of State, Member of the Prussian House of Representatives and the Provincial Assembly of East Prussia
- Emil Braemer (1881), 1859–1939, District Administrator of the Oletzko district, member of the Provincial Diet of East Prussia, Member of the Prussian House of Representatives
- Georg von Dehn-Schmidt (1899), 1876–1937, Envoy
- Rudolf Doehn (1841), 1821–1894, writer and politician
- Konrad Engelhardt (1881), 1861–1917, District Administrator of the Lüneburg district
- Wolf Freiherr von Engelhardt (1930), 1910–2008, geologist and mineralogist, professor at the University of Tübingen
- Claus-Dieter Freymann (1966), * 1938, professor of educational science, chairman of the board of trustees of the Diakonisches Werk in the Kirchenkreis An der Ruhr, jazz musician
- Heinrich Fritsch (1866, formerly Tübinger Schwabe), 1844–1915, professor of gynecology at the Universities of Breslau and Bonn
- Franz Galli (1859), 1839–1917, judge at the Reichsgericht
- Wolf von Gottberg (1885), 1865–1938, District Administrator of the Crossen (Oder) district
- Eduard Graf (1848, honorary member, later also Greifswalder Preuße), 1829–1895, physician, Member of the Prussian House of Representatives
- Robert Eduard von Hagemeister (1846), 1827–1902, Senior President of Westphalia
- Erwin Hasbach (1896, honorary member), 1875–1970, member of the Sejm, senator of the Polish Senate, Führer of the Deutschtum in Poland
- Hans von Jacobs (1888), 1868–1915, diplomat, General Director of the Deutsche Levante-Linie
- Theodor Karbe (1850), 1829–1886, owner of a knight's estate, Member of the Prussian House of Representatives
- Ernst Knebel (1912), 1892–1945, Major General, recipient of the Knight's Cross of the Iron Cross with Oak Leaves
- Günther Knecht (1959, formerly Starkenburger), 1909–1995, administrative lawyer, most recently police director in Neuss from 1964 to 1974
- Leonhard Lehfeldt (1860), 1834–1876, city judge, Member of the Prussian House of Representatives
- Adalbert Matthaei (1879), 1859–1924, art historian, university lecturer in Kiel and Danzig
- Hermann von Mohrenschild (1879), 1860–1928, lord of an entailed estate, Estonian district administrator
- Richard Münter (1880), died 1938, Major General
- Konrad Niemeyer (1847), 1828–1903, classical philologist, director of the Kiel Gelehrtenschule
- Eduard Nortz (1887), 1868–1939, administrative lawyer and ministerial official in Bavaria
- Arnold Paulssen (1884), 1864–1942, Thuringian Minister of State
- Walter Rehfeld (1882), 1859–1933, District Administrator of the Dannenberg district
- Heinrich Robolski (1877, honorary member), 1858–1939, President of the Imperial Patent Office
- Max Roepell (1861), 1841–1903, President of the Royal Railway Directorates in Kattowitz and Posen
- Georg Rumler (1893, formerly Würzburger Rhenane), died 1940, Senate President at the Imperial Insurance Office, director of the Central Germany Main Supply Office
- August Sartori (1850, formerly Jenenser Thüringer), 1827–1908, pedagogist
- Franz Saxer (1883), 1864–1903, pathologist
- Georg Schleusner (1860), 1841–1911, superintendent in Cochstedt
- Waldemar Schultze (1855), c. 1835–1877, district officer in Dillenburg, district director in Mülhausen
- Paul von Spaeth (1881), 1859–1936, lord of an entailed estate, member of the Provincial Diet of East Prussia, Member of the Prussian House of Representatives
- Richard von Spalding (1891, formerly Bonner Hanseate), 1871–1913, Privy Senior Government Councillor, Reporting Councillor at the Imperial Colonial Office, deputy Governor of German East Africa
- Richard Spendelin (1880), 1859–1898, District Administrator of the Schrimm district (missing from the 1960 corps list)
- Otto Steinmann (1848), 1831–1894, Government President in Gumbinnen, Member of the Prussian House of Representatives, Member of the Reichstag
- Karl Tettenborn (1878), 1858–1938, Lord Mayor of Altona, Member of the House of Lords
- Walter von Trebra (1889), 1869–1924, District Administrator in Ragnit and Hagen
- Wilhelm Freiherr von Zedlitz und Neukirch (1868), 1848–1923, District Administrator of the Schönau district, lord of the manor, Member of the Prussian House of Lords

== Bibliography ==
- Westphalenverein e.V. Halle/Saale (ed.): 200 Jahre Corps Guestphalia Halle zu Münster, Münster 1989.
- Hans Peter Hümmer: "Wer genehmigte die Vordatierung des Corps Guestphalia Halle von 1840 auf 1789." Einst und Jetzt 49 (2004): 368–377.
- Thorsten Lehmann: Die Hallenser Corps im Deutschen Kaiserreich, Halle/Saale 2007.
