= Kurd Kisshauer =

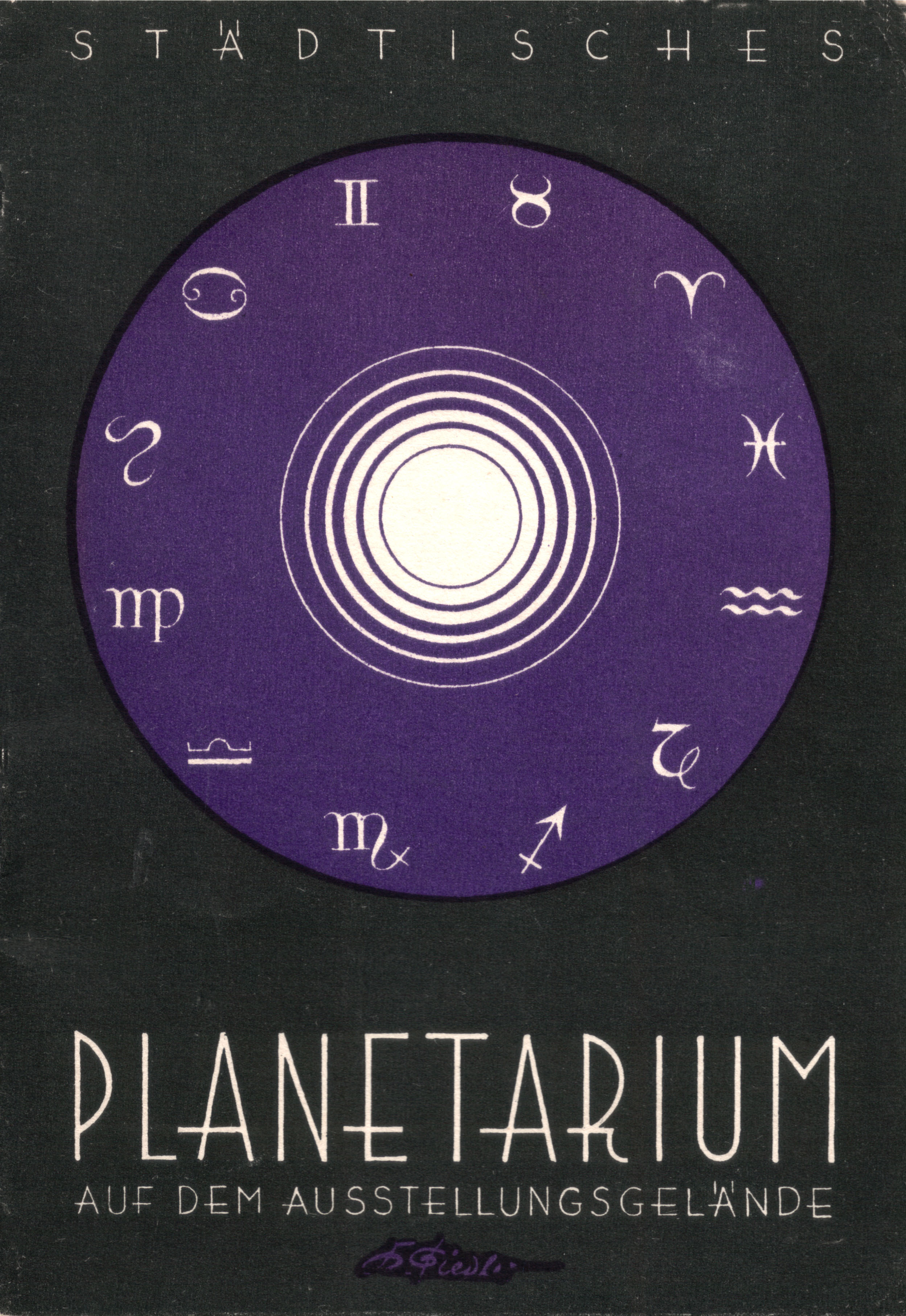
Book cover on Dresden's planetarium (graphics: Kurt Fiedler)

Kurd Kisshauer (December 29, 1886 – November 14, 1958) was a member of the German society for astronomy. During the Third Reich he was employed at Amt Rosenberg.

== Life ==
Kisshauer (also rendered as Kißhauer) was born in Berlin. He obtained a doctorate in political science. He soon gained a greater reputation, however, as an amateur astronomer. In 1919, he was charged with selling the equipment of the closed observatory in Bothkamp. In 1922, Ernst II, Duke of Saxe-Altenburg engaged him for the newly set-up observatory in Wolfersdorf.

Afterwards Kisshauer moved to the near Jena where he worked at Carl Zeiss AG and wrote first publications on astronomy and projection planetaria designed by Walther Bauersfeld. In 1926, he founded and led the municipal planetarium of Dresden, situated north-west of Großer Garten. Around 1930 Kisshauer moved to Berlin where he lived in the Großsiedlung Siemensstadt.

As a fellow worker of Alfred Rosenberg he was charged during World War II with psychological warfare, distributing specially written horoscopes. Kisshauer was the contact person of Karl Ernst Krafft, collecting and evaluating his material. In 1941, he got deeply involved in Nazi internal conflicts on astrology after Rodulf Hess' flight to Scotland. Moreover, he imposed some influence to prevent followers of Albert Einstein's theory of relativity from getting professorships in theoretical physics.

After war Kisshauer again gave lectures on astronomy, e.g. at Senckenberg Gesellschaft für Naturforschung and in radio broadcasts.

Kisshauer died in 1959 in Frankfurt/Main.

Ellic Howe quoted him in his books on astrology in the Third Reich, regretting he had not interviewed Kisshauer before his death.

== Works ==
- Städtisches Planetarium auf dem Ausstellungsgelände. Dr. Güntz'sche Stiftung, Dresden, 1927.
- Der Sternenhimmel im Feldglas. Hesse & Becker, Leipzig, 1928.
- Horoskop und Familie. In: Praktikum für Familienforscher, Vol. 22, Degener & Co., Leipzig, 1932.
- Sternenlauf und Lebensweg: Betrachtungen über Astrologie. Reclam, Leipzig, 1935 and 1941.

== Literature ==
=== About the astronomer ===
- Gudrun Wolfschmidt: Astronomisches Mäzenatentum. BoD – Books on Demand, p. 76, 2009
- Felix Lühning: "--eine ausnehmende Zierde und Vortheil": Geschichte der Kieler Universitätssternwarte und ihrer Vorgängerinnen, 1770-1950: zwei Jahrhunderte Arbeit und Forschung zwischen Grenzen und Möglichkeiten. Wachholtz, 2007

=== About time with Rosenberg ===
- Ellic Howe: Nostradamus and the Nazis: a footnote to the history of the Third Reich. Arborfield, 1965
- Ellic Howe: Astrology: a recent history including the untold story of its role in World War II. Walker, 1968
- Ellic Howe: Astrology and psychological warfare during World War II., Rider, 1972
