= Hermann Kranold =

German political writer

Hermann Kuno Julius Kranold (also Hermann Kranold-Steinhaus; 1888, Hannover – 1942, Talladega, Alabama) was a German political writer and politician active in the Social Democratic Party of Germany (SPD). After the Nazi seizure of power in 1933, he was arrested and then went into exile in the United States where he became a college professor.

== In the German Revolution ==
Following the German Revolution, Kranold worked with Otto Neurath and Wolfgang Schumann on the Programm Kranold-Neurath-Schumann in Saxony. All three subsequently went to Bavaria, where Neurath was appointed President of the Central Economic Administration for the Bavarian Soviet Republic.

== During the Weimar Republic ==
Kranold served as the Landrat (district administrator) of the Sprottau district in the Prussian Province of Lower Silesia from 1925 to 1932. Following the Prussian coup of July 1932, he was dismissed. He subsequently became the Bürgermeister (mayor) of Haynau in Silesia (today, Chojnów in Poland).

== Exile in the United States ==
After the Nazi seizure of power in 1933, he was arrested on the day of the Reichstag fire and imprisoned. However, his uncle, Max Planck, was able to arrange his release and exile. After a short period in London, he found a teaching job at Talladega College in Alabama. He received financial help from the American Friends Service Committee for the travel costs for him and his family who arrived in the US in 1936. Here, he did work on the economic situation of African Americans in Alabama and elsewhere.

== Family life ==
He married "Red Sophie" Steinhaus, an art historian and revolutionary. They had three children, Candida ("Candy"), Peter, and Johanna Kranold who were born in Sprottau, Silesia. Both Hermann and his wife died of heart disease in 1942.

== Works ==
- Wirtschaftsgeographische Grundlagen zur Weltpolitik Augsburg: Augsburger Buchdr. u. Verlagsanst. 1916
- Zollunion und Agrarpolitik : die Wirkung einer Vereinigung des deutschen Zollgebietes mit Südosteuropa auf die deutsche Landwirtschaft, Dresden: "Globus", Wiss. Verlagsanstalt, 1917
- "Zum Geburtenrückgang", in Deutsche Wille des Kunstwarts, April 1918, Munich:Callwey pp 35–40
- "Karl Marx", in Deutsche Wille des Kunstwarts, April 1918, Munich:Callwey pp 60–62
- Streitschrift zur Frage der Sozialisierung , Chemnitz: 1919
- "Das deutsche Militärsystem im Weltkrieg", "Abschied von der deutschen Nationalversammlung" in Sozialistische Monatshefte Year 26 volume 54 1920 I
- "Zur Leistung des deutschen Militärsystems", "Zur Produktivität der Landwirtschaft", "Zu den Preussischen Landtagswahlen 1921" in Sozialistische Monatshefte Year 26 volume 55 1920 II
- Bekanntschaft mit dem Sozialismus. Eine Einführung für Jugendliche und Erwachsene, Verlag: Görlitz 1928
- Genossenschaften im neuen Italien, Leipzig: Buske Verlag, 1935 (with Karl Walter)
