= Rudolf Doehn =

American politician

Rudolf Doehn (2 February 1821, Hinrichshagen – 9 April 1895, Dresden) was a German writer and journalist. He belonged to the Forty-Eighters who participated in the American Civil War as volunteers in the Union Army. Here, he became also known as Randolph Doehn.

== Life ==
Rudolf Doehn studied philosophy at the University of Halle-Wittenberg and was, from 1841, a member of the Corps Guestphalia Halle. He wrote his Dissertation de speculativo logices Platonicae principio on Plato at the University of Greifswald in 1845, and continued his studies of jurisprudence in Berlin and at the University of Rostock. After the defeat of the revolutions of 1848 in the German states, he emigrated to the United States in 1854. Doehn settled in St. Louis, worked as a teacher for the freethoughts, and married Francisca Martins in 1858.

In 1860, Doehn was elected to the Missouri House of Representatives. He belonged to the German volunteers who helped prevent Confederate forces from seizing the government arsenal in St. Louis during the Camp Jackson Affair. His wife supported him and called in the Anzeiger des Westens for supporting John C. Frémont and Franz Sigel. Doehn was a member of the Missouri General Emancipation Society, founded by Benjamin Gratz Brown und Charles D. Drake, who demanded even more consequent measures against slavery as foreseen by Abraham Lincoln in his Emancipation Proclamation of 1862, which excluded border states like Missouri.

Rudolf Doehn went back to Germany in 1865. He settled in Dresden and wrote many books about the political system of the U.S. and its literature; he also published in Die Gartenlaube, Germany's most successful family magazine. Doehn was a leading member of some well-known poetry groups and movements in Germany. His daughter Franziska married Ferdinand Avenarius, Doehn's son Bruno, a jurist, became known during the Weimar Republic. Doehn's grandson Wolfgang Schumann was a writer and journalist.

== Works ==
- Works by Rudolf Doehn in the catalogue Open Library
- Works by Rudolf Doehn in the catalogue WorldCat
- Works by Rudolf Doehn in the catalogue HathiTrust
