= Sarrasani =

German circus company

Coordinates: 51°03′33″N 13°44′43″E

Sarrasani is a German circus and entertainment company associated particularly with Dresden and the nearby city of Radebeul. Founded by the animal trainer and clown Hans Stosch in 1901, it became one of Europe’s largest and best-known circus enterprises during the first half of the 20th century. After the destruction of its permanent Dresden theatre during the bombing of Dresden in 1945, separate successors operated in Argentina and West Germany. Since 2000, the German company has been directed by magician and producer André Sarrasani and has concentrated mainly on variety, illusion and dinner shows.

== History ==
=== Foundation and early years ===
Hans Stosch was born in 1873 in Lomnitz, then part of the Province of Posen. As a teenager, he joined a travelling show and later performed as an animal trainer and clown under the stage name Giovanni Sarrasani. He subsequently combined his family name and stage name, becoming known as Hans Stosch-Sarrasani.

In 1901, Stosch-Sarrasani established his own travelling circus in Radebeul, near Dresden. The new company gave its official premiere as Circus Sarrasani in Meissen on 30 March 1902. Its programme combined equestrian acts, animal training, clowning and performances by artists recruited internationally."Circus Sarrasani". Circopedia.

The circus developed into a large touring organisation. Stosch-Sarrasani employed extensive advertising campaigns and presented the company as an international spectacle. Elephants became one of its most recognisable features. The programmes also included performers who were presented to European audiences as representatives of non-European cultures, including groups of Native American performers. Such presentations reflected the exoticising and colonial conventions common in European popular entertainment at the time.Otte, Marline (2006). Jewish Identities in German Popular Entertainment, 1890–1933. Cambridge University Press. pp. 38–39. ISBN 978-0-521-85630-0.

=== The Dresden circus theatre ===
On 22 December 1912, Sarrasani opened a permanent circus building at Königin-Carola-Platz in Dresden. Designed by the architect Max Littmann, the building was promoted as the ‘‘Circus-Theater 5000’’. Although the name suggested a capacity of 5,000, surviving police records indicate that the authorised capacity was approximately 3,860.

The building contained a circus ring, restaurants, artists’ facilities and technical and administrative rooms. In addition to circus programmes, it was used for variety performances, sporting events and public meetings. At the same time, Sarrasani continued to operate as a touring circus in Germany and abroad.

Operations were restricted during the First World War, when animals, vehicles and other equipment were requisitioned and many foreign performers left Germany. The company was rebuilt after the war and expanded considerably during the 1920s. At its height, Sarrasani employed hundreds of performers and technical workers and travelled with large numbers of horses, elephants and other animals.

=== Tours in South America ===
From 1923 to 1925, Sarrasani undertook a major tour of South America, performing in Brazil, Uruguay and Argentina. Its appearances in Buenos Aires helped establish the Sarrasani name in Argentine popular culture. A second period of South American touring followed during the 1930s.

The company transported performers, animals, tents and equipment between Europe and South America. Stosch-Sarrasani also used publications and fictionalised travel accounts to promote the tours. The circus’s scale and international composition contributed to its reputation as one of the most prominent German entertainment companies of the interwar period.

Hans Stosch-Sarrasani died in São Paulo in 1934 while the circus was touring Brazil. Management passed to his son, Hans Stosch-Sarrasani junior. Faced with financial difficulties, the younger Stosch-Sarrasani reduced the size of the travelling organisation and divided its activities between Europe and South America.

=== National Socialist period and destruction ===
Circus Sarrasani returned to Germany for the period surrounding the 1936 Summer Olympics in Berlin. During the National Socialist period, its management had to operate within the regime’s system of cultural control and racial restrictions.

Hans Stosch-Sarrasani junior died in 1941. His widow, Gertrud “Trude” Stosch-Sarrasani, subsequently assumed responsibility for the company. From 1940, the German operation also appeared under the name ‘‘Sächsischer Heimatzirkus’’ (“Saxon Homeland Circus”).

The permanent Sarrasani theatre was destroyed during the bombing of Dresden on 13 February 1945 and was never rebuilt. The site was later redeveloped. Sarrasanistraße, a commemorative plaque and the Sarrasani Fountain in Dresden recall the former circus and its theatre.

=== Argentine branch ===
After the war, Trude Stosch-Sarrasani moved to Argentina. In 1948, she re-established the circus in Buenos Aires. President Juan Perón and Eva Perón attended its reopening, and the company was subsequently presented as the ‘‘Circo Nacional Argentino’’.

Under Trude Stosch-Sarrasani, the company continued to tour Argentina and other parts of South America, at times using the name ‘‘Sarrasani-Shangri La’’. Although smaller than the pre-war enterprise, it remained a familiar part of Argentine circus culture until the early 1970s. Its final performances took place around 1972–1973.Bernstein, Gustavo (2000). Sarrasani: entre la fábula y la epopeya (in Spanish). Buenos Aires: Editorial Biblos. ISBN 950-786-248-X.

Trude Stosch-Sarrasani later lived in San Clemente del Tuyú, Argentina. She revisited Dresden and Radebeul after German reunification and died in Argentina in 2009.

=== Revival in West Germany ===
A separate German revival was created in 1956 by the circus director Fritz Mey, a former Sarrasani employee. Mey obtained permission to use the name from Hedwig Stosch-Brandt, a daughter of the founder. The reconstructed Circus Sarrasani premiered in Mannheim and subsequently toured West Germany and other European countries.

Ingrid Wimmer joined the company as a member of a cowboy and whip act. She became Mey’s partner and increasingly participated in the management of the circus. In 1976, the childless Trude Stosch-Sarrasani adopted her, establishing a formal connection between the revived German company and the Stosch-Sarrasani family.

Ingrid Stosch-Sarrasani assumed the directorship in 1980. She modernised the company’s equipment, lighting and production style while retaining traditional circus disciplines. One of the best-known productions of her period was ‘‘Circus-Poesie’’.

In 1990, Sarrasani performed in Dresden again for the first time since the destruction of its theatre. Ingrid Stosch-Sarrasani continued to direct the company until 2000, when she transferred its management to her son, André Sarrasani.Dany, Marion (28 February 2014). "Ein Leben in der Manege – Ingrid Stosch-Sarrasani, Zirkusdirektorin". WDR 5 (in German).

=== André Sarrasani and the Trocadero ===
Under André Sarrasani, the company moved away from regular travelling-circus tours and developed into a broader entertainment business. Its productions combined circus acts with large-scale illusions, music, comedy and hospitality.

In 2004, Sarrasani established the ‘‘Trocadero’’ dinner show in Dresden. The format combined a variety and illusion programme with a multi-course meal in a stationary tent venue. The company also produced touring shows and special events.

On 1 July 2016, Sarrasani GmbH filed for insolvency. Performances continued through the newly established Sarrasani Event GmbH. The new company temporarily moved its headquarters to Radebeul and operated the theatre restaurant at the ‘‘Goldene Weintraube’’ venue until 2018."Privatinsolvenz für Zirkusdirektor André Sarrasani". Dresdner Neueste Nachrichten (in German). 10 August 2017.

Ingrid Stosch-Sarrasani remained associated with the productions after transferring management to her son. She died in Radebeul on 28 April 2022 at the age of 88.Gabler, Matthias (28 April 2022). "Zirkus-Welt trauert um Ingrid Stosch-Sarrasani". Radio Dresden (in German).

=== Present-day operation ===
During the early 2020s, Sarrasani continued to present seasonal dinner shows in Dresden. The productions combined acrobatics, magic, comedy and music with a restaurant service. Until 2025, the Trocadero tent was located near the Elbepark shopping centre.

For the 2025–2026 season, the company moved its Dresden dinner show to the Cockerwiese and presented the production ‘‘Mystique’’. Management and creative work were shared by André Sarrasani, Edith Slavova and their daughter Satin Sarrasani.

In August 2026, the company announced that it would return to the Cockerwiese for the 2026–2027 season. The production, entitled ‘‘Dream’’, was scheduled to run from 20 November 2026 to 10 January 2027, with 32 performances. The programme was announced as a combination of illusion, acrobatics, comedy, music and a four-course dinner.Catoni, Laura (26 August 2026). "Neue Sarrasani-Dinnershow auf der Cockerwiese: Ticketverkauf beginnt". Dresdner Neueste Nachrichten (in German).

Sarrasani therefore continues as a Dresden-based entertainment brand, although its present format differs substantially from the large travelling circus established by Hans Stosch-Sarrasani in the early 20th century.

== Directors ==
- Hans Stosch-Sarrasani senior, 1901–1934
- Hans Stosch-Sarrasani junior, 1934–1941
- Trude Stosch-Sarrasani, 1941–1972/73, primarily in Argentina after 1948
- Fritz Mey, 1956–1980, German revival
- Ingrid Stosch-Sarrasani, 1980–2000
- André Sarrasani, since 2000

== Cultural legacy ==
Sarrasani was one of the largest European circus enterprises of the interwar period. Its Dresden theatre, international tours and extensive advertising helped make the name widely known in Germany and South America.

In Argentina, Sarrasani was referenced in popular literature and tango culture. The company’s history was chronicled by Gustavo Bernstein in the 2000 book ‘‘Sarrasani: entre la fábula y la epopeya’’. It was also the subject of the documentary film ‘‘Sarrasani, el legado de un circo’’, directed by Paula de Luque.

== Literature ==
- Bernstein, Gustavo. ‘‘Sarrasani: entre la fábula y la epopeya’’. Buenos Aires: Editorial Biblos, 2000. ISBN 950-786-248-X.
- Günther, Ernst. ‘‘Sarrasani: Geschichte und Geschichten’’. Dresden: Edition Sächsische Zeitung, 2005.
- Stosch-Sarrasani, Hans. ‘‘Durch die Welt im Zirkuszelt’’.
- Otte, Marline. ‘‘Jewish Identities in German Popular Entertainment, 1890–1933’’. Cambridge University Press, 2006.
- Stosch-Sarrasani, Hans: Durch die Welt im Zirkuszelt. Berlin Schützen-Verl. 1940.
- Hahnke, Gustav von: Zirkus Sarrasani. Hinter den Kulissen einer Weltschau. Berlin u.a. Schmidt. 1952
- Günther, Ernst: Sarrasani, wie er wirklich war. 3., erg. und erw. Aufl. Berlin Henschel. 1991
- Günther, Ernst: Der lachende Sarrasani. Anekdoten aus der Welt eines berühmten Zirkus. Husum-Dr.- und Verl.-Ges. 1992
