= Oskar Seyffert =

German University Professor

Oskar Seyffert (19 February 1862, Dresden – 22 February 1940, Dresden) was a German art professor at the Königliche Kunstgewerbeschule ("Royal Art and Vocational School") in the Kingdom of Saxony.

As a folklorist, Seyffert was the founder and chairman of the Verein für Sächsische Volkskunde, from which Dresden's Museum für Sächsische Volkskunst and Puppentheatersammlung developed. Between 1927 and 1949 this museum was known as the Oskar-Seyffert-Museum. A street in Dresden-Gittersee is also named after Seyffert.
