= Ferdinand Avenarius =

German lyric poet

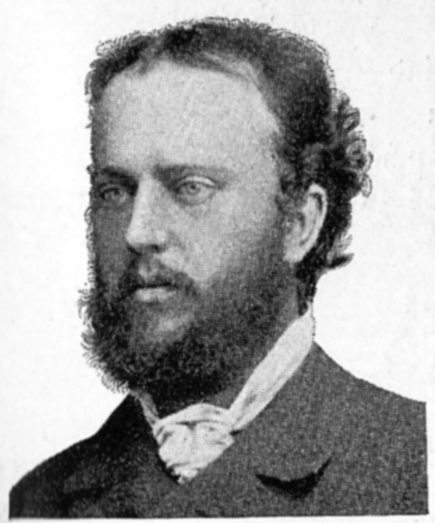
Ferdinand Avenarius in a 1901 publication

Ferdinand Avenarius (20 December 1856, in Berlin – 22 September 1923, in Kampen) was a German lyric poet, a leading representative of the culture reform movement of his time and the first popularizer of Sylt.

== Life ==
Avenarius was born in Berlin. His father, Eduard Avenarius, a publisher from Leipzig, founded a joint subsidiary company with the Brockhaus publishing house. His mother, Cäcilie née Geyer, was a daughter of the actor and painter Ludwig Geyer. Eduard Avenarius represented the company in Paris, where he consorted with Heinrich Heine and Richard Wagner, the latter being the step-uncle of Ferdinand Avenarius and his brother, the philosopher Richard Avenarius. However, there are speculations in science that Ludwig Geyer was not only the stepfather but the biological father of Wagner too.

Ferdinand Avenarius attended schools in Berlin and Dresden and studied in Leipzig and Zurich medicine, natural sciences, art and literature history as well as philosophy. He returned to Dresden in 1882, where he founded the magazine Der Kunstwart, the leading publication channel of the German culture reform movement, which was dedicated to aesthetic education as well as to love to culture and nature. Avenarius married Else Doehn divorced Schumann. His father-in-law, Dr. Rudolf Doehn, was a German writer and an American representative in Missouri. In 1895, Schilling & Graebner built a first villa for Avenarius in Blasewitz, where he lived with his wife and his step-son Wolfgang Schumann.

In 1902, Avenarius founded together, with art historian Paul Schumann, the Dürerbund, named after Albrecht Dürer, which became the leading culture organization in the German Empire, Austria and Switzerland. Avenarius was member of Deutscher Werkbund and belonged to the directorate of the German garden city movement. From 1903, Avenarius spent the summer months on Sylt, which he made popular. Kampen made him its first honorary citizen and the University of Heidelberg appointed him honorary doctor.

Avenarius became especially known as editor and publisher. In 1902, he published a very successful anthology of German poetry: Hausbuch Deutscher Lyrik. He supported young authors like Hermann Häfker and painters, but fought heavily against all appearances of "low taste" or "little value", as he ranked e.g. the work by Karl May. This controversy lasted many years.
