= Dürerbund =

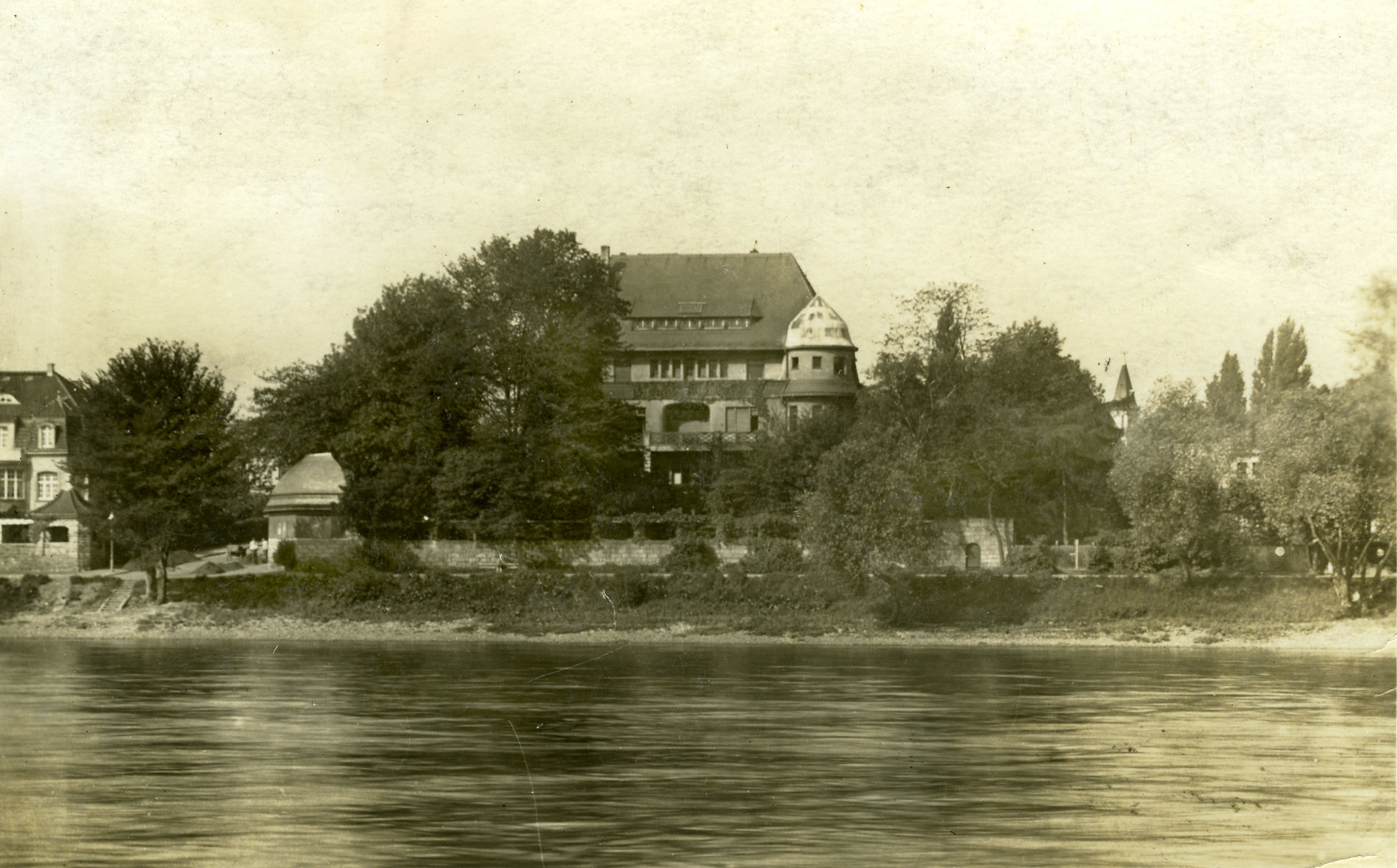
Dürerbundhaus Blasewitz

The Dürerbund (named after Albrecht Dürer) was an organization of writers and artists with a strong influence on the intellectual life of the middle class in the German Reich, but also in Austria and Switzerland.

The Dürerbund was founded in 1902 by the German publisher Ferdinand Avenarius, a brother of the philosopher Richard Avenarius, and the art historian Paul Schumann. It resided in Dresden-Blasewitz and had close connections to Deutscher Werkbund and the garden city movement, as Avenarius was a key person in these organizations too.

The Dürerbund was not only the leading cultural organization in Germany that time, moreover it aimed at contributing to aesthetic education and education to love of nature of the broad masses. For many years, it was organized like a reading circle in which publications as Der Kunstwart, a magazine initiated and edited by Avenarius, could be distributed effectively. Among the many widely known authors were Hermann Bahr, Christian Morgenstern, Peter Rosegger, Georg Simmel, and Carl Spitteler. Renowned personalities participated in the management board of the association, among them Adolf Bartels, Marie von Ebner-Eschenbach, Karl Lamprecht, Friedrich Naumann, and Henry Thode.

Key dates of the Dürerbund:

- 1902 Establishment of the Dürerbund in Dresden
- 1910 Erection of the Dürerbundhaus in Dresden-Blasewitz
- 1912 Dürerbund had 300,000 members
- 1914 Establishment of the Dürerbund-Werkbund-Genossenschaft in Hellerau, which published the Deutsche Warenbuch evaluating industrial products for the consumers
- 1923 Avenarius died, Paul Schumann und Wolfgang Schumann took leadership
- 1935 Dürerbund closed, the painter Karl Hanusch was the last head
