= October Group =

October Group may refer to:

- International Communist League (Vietnam)
- October Group (constructivism)
