= Viktor Deni =

Russian and Soviet artist (1893–1946)

- Russian: Виктор Николаевич Денисов
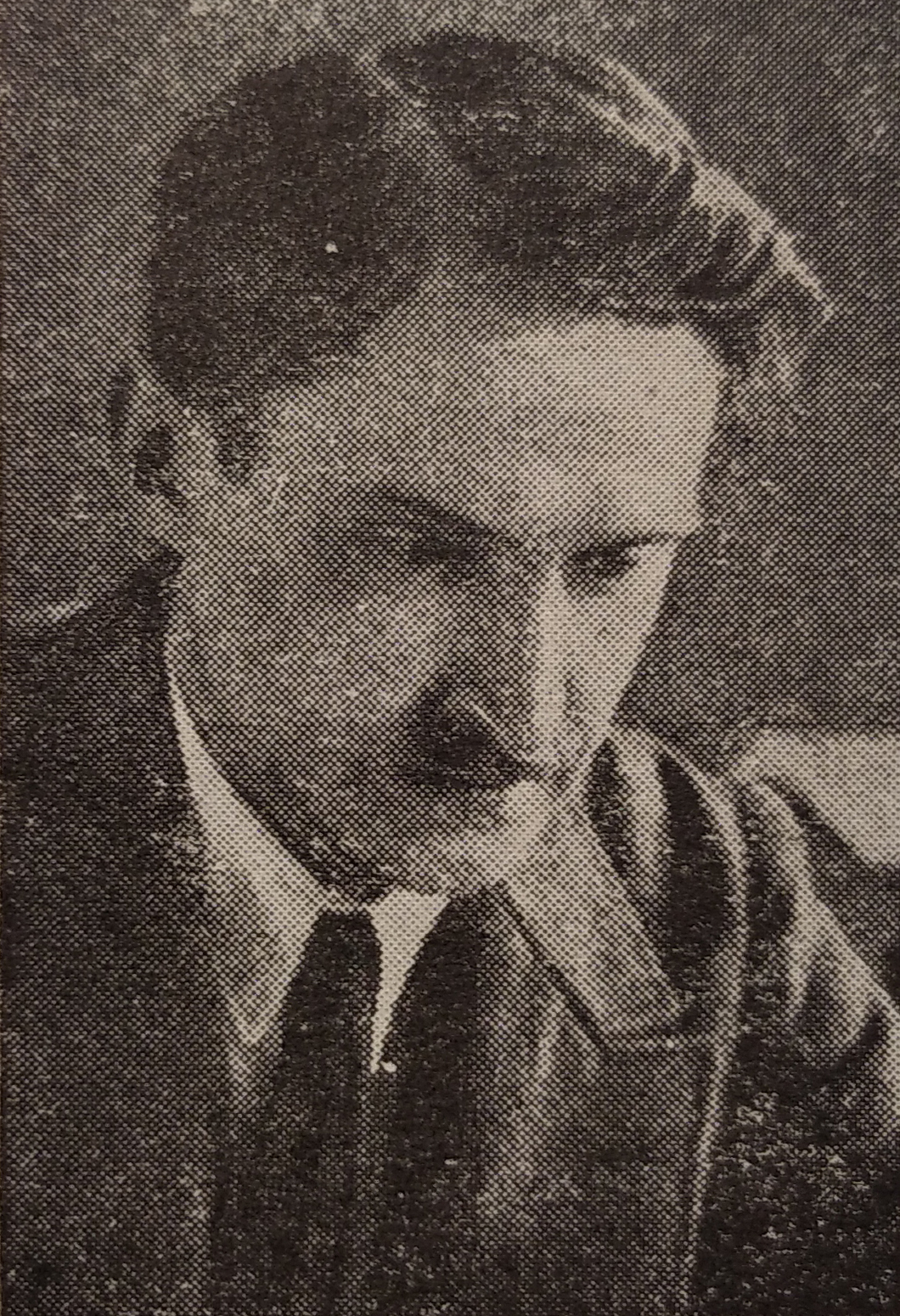
- Viktor Deni in 1933
- Born: Viktor Nikolayevich Denisov; 8 March 1893; Moscow, Russian Empire
- Died: 3 August 1946 (aged 53); Moscow, Russian SFSR, Soviet Union Soviet (1917–1946)

Viktor Nikolayevich Denisov (Russian: Виктор Николаевич Денисов; 8 March 1893 – 3 August 1946), best known by the shortened pseudonym Viktor Deni, was a Russian and Soviet satirist, cartoonist and poster artist. Deni was one of the major agitprop poster artists of the Bolshevist period (1917–1921).

His art is held in the collections of the Tate Modern.

== Biography ==
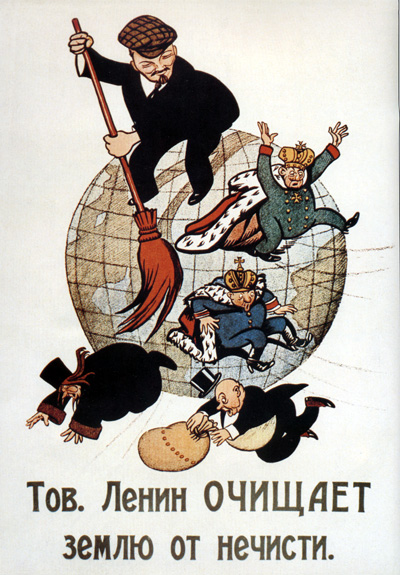
"Comrade Lenin sweeps the Earth clean from filth", 1920

Born in Moscow in 1893, Denisov later shortened his surname to Deni. Deni moved to Saint Petersburg in 1913 where he established himself as a successful caricaturist, his caricatures appearing in a number of illustrated satirical journals. After the October Revolution Deni worked for the Litizdat (the state publishing house), an agency founded in June 1919 to coordinate the various publishing centres on behalf of the Bolsheviks. He produced nearly 50 political posters during the Russian Civil War, including some of his most well known satirical work. He became one of the major agitprop poster artists of the Bolshevist period (1917–1921). Deni subsequently focused on producing newspaper cartoons that addressed foreign policy issues.

Deni taught poster artist Nina Vatolina from 1935 until 1939; Vatolina married his son, Nikolai, in 1934.

During the German–Soviet War (World War II), he returned to the medium of the political poster together with several other prominent poster artists of the Civil War such as Mikhail Cheremnykh and Dmitry Moor.

== See also ==
- List of Soviet poster artists
