= Chazen Museum of Art =

Museum in Madison, Wisconsin, US

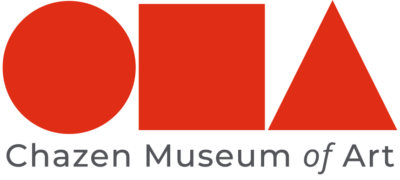

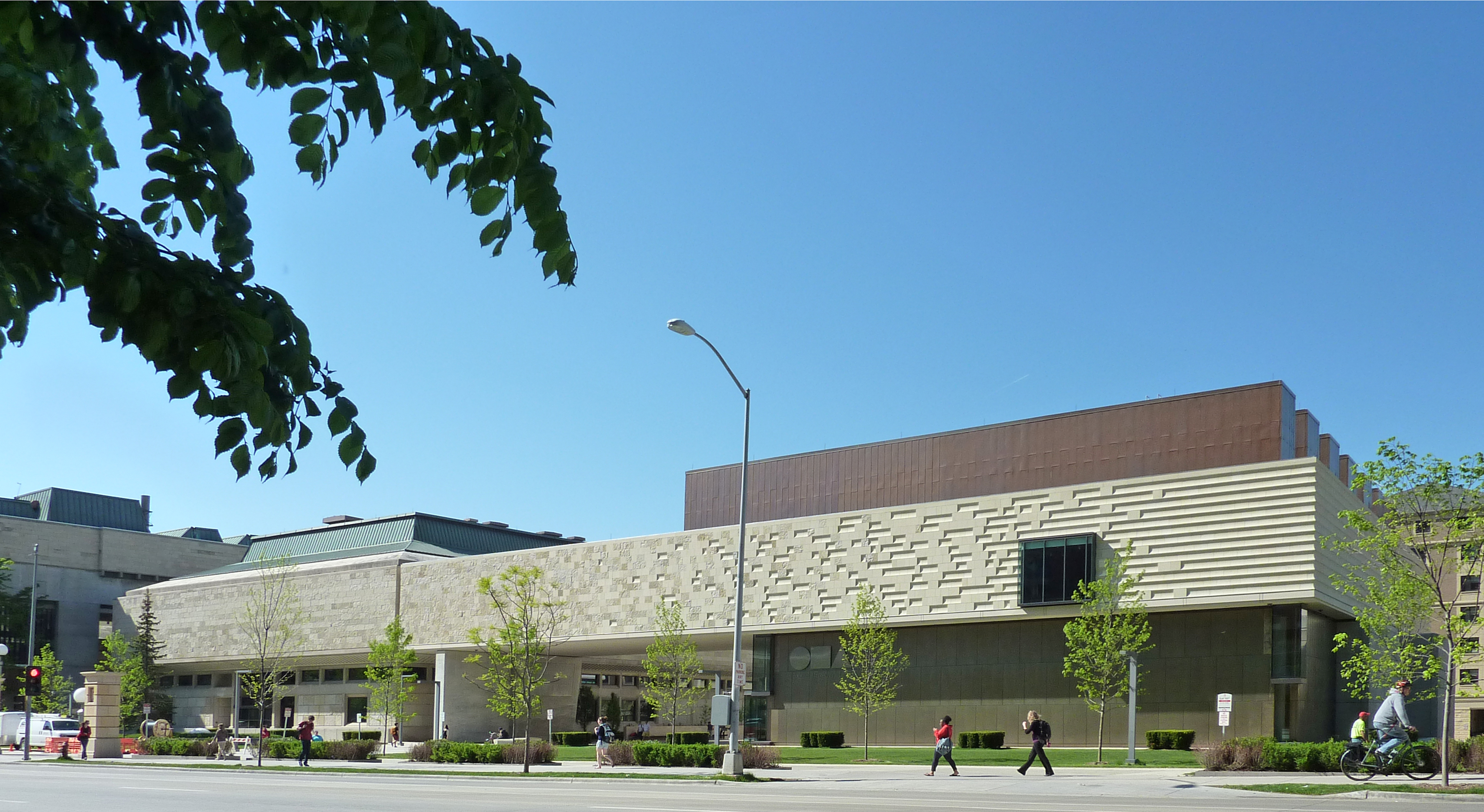
- The Chazen Museum of Art complex in 2012
- Former name: Elvehjem Museum of Art
- Established: September 11, 1970; 55 years ago
- Location: 750 University Ave; Madison, Wisconsin; United States
- Type: Art museum
- Collection size: 25,000 works
- Visitors: 100,000 (2023)
- Director: Amy Gilman
- Website: chazen.wisc.edu

- UW-Madison Humanities Building and Elvehjem Art Center
- U.S. Historic district – Contributing property
- Location within Wisconsin
- Location: 750 University Avenue, Madison, Wisconsin
- Coordinates: 43°4′26″N 89°23′59″W
- Built: 1968
- Architect: Harry Weese
- Architectural style: Brutalism
- Website: www.chazen.wisc.edu
- Part of: Bascom Hill Historic District (ID74000065)
- Designated CP: September 12, 1974

The Chazen Museum of Art is an art museum located on the campus of the University of Wisconsin–Madison in Madison, Wisconsin.

Founded as the Elvehjem Art Center (later Elvehjem Museum of Art) in 1970, the museum moved into a brutalist building designed by Illinois architect Harry Weese to house the university's collection of 1,600 artworks. The museum was named after then-president of UW-Madison, biochemist Conrad Elvehjem.

In 2005, the institution was renamed Chazen Museum of Art following an important gift by businessman Jerome A. Chazen and his wife Simona, both university alums. The gift provided part of the construction funds for an additional museum building. The structure was designed by the Boston-based architectural firm Machado-Silvetti and inaugurated in 2011.

With 176,000 sq. ft. of gross floor area and a collection of over 25,000 objects as of 2026, the Chazen Museum of Art is the second-largest art museum in Wisconsin, after the Milwaukee Art Museum.

== History ==
Until 2005, the Museum was known regularly as the Elvehjem Museum of Art, named after Conrad Elvehjem, the 13th president of the University of Wisconsin-Madison and an internationally known biochemist in nutrition. In May 2005, the museum was renamed the Chazen Museum of Art after a $20 million building-expansion donation from alumni Simona and Jerome A. Chazen, the latter being a founder of Liz Claiborne Inc. (now known as Kate Spade & Company). The original museum building, which opened in 1970, retains the Elvehjem name.

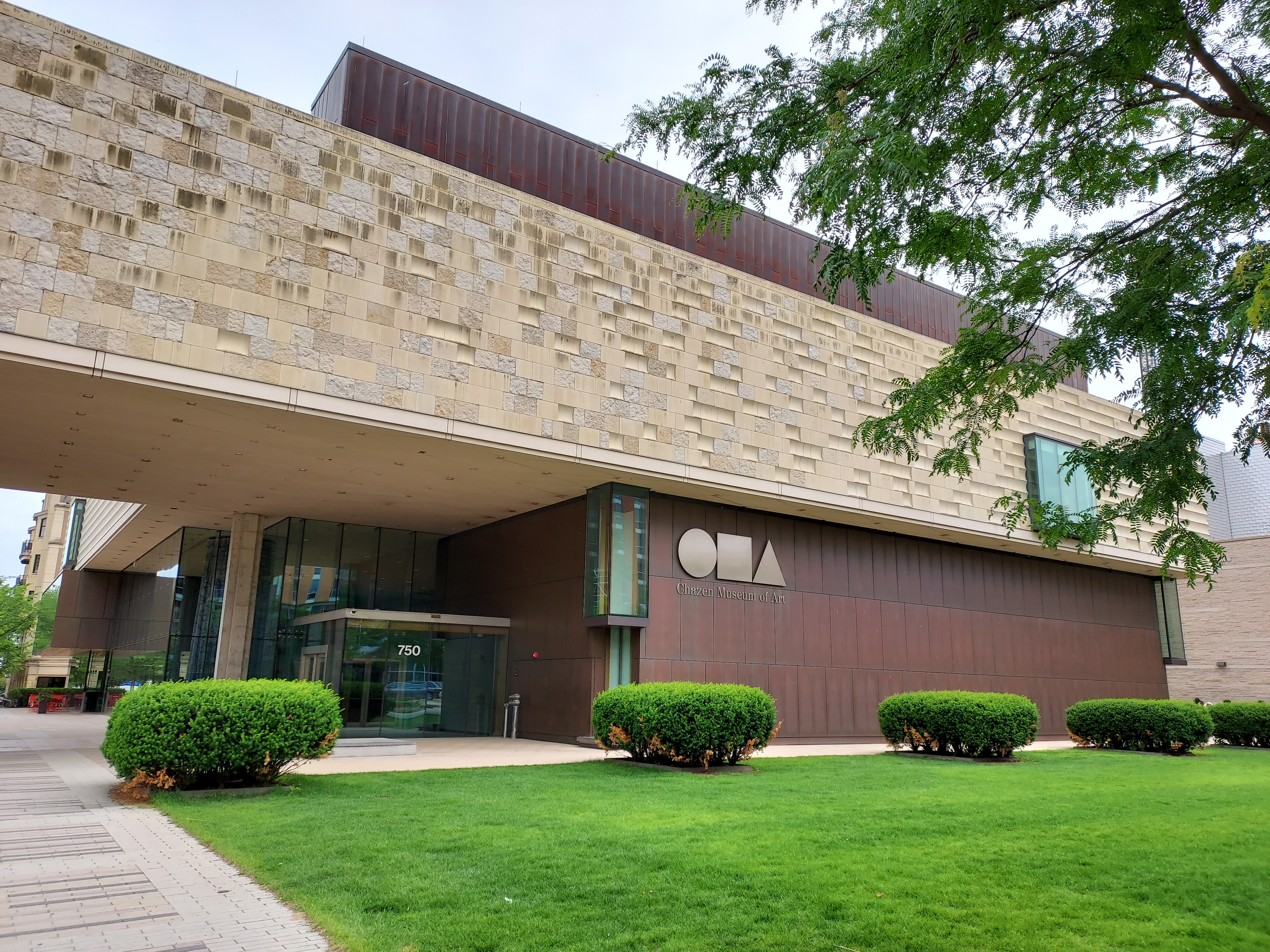
The Chazen Museum of Art's main building in 2025.

In 2011, the Chazens again made a substantial donation to the museum that included $5 million dedicated to the museum building, $3 million to endow chairs in art and art history at the University of Wisconsin, and 30 works of art valued at $20 million. A new building, designed by Machado & Silvetti Associates, opened in 2011. Joined by a bridge to the older Conrad A. Elvehjem building, it doubled the size of the museum.

After three decades as the museum's director, Russell Panczenko stepped down in 2017 and was replaced by new director Amy Gilman who is still working today.

In 2018, the Association of Art Museum Directors announced a pilot program that would provide paid internships to minority undergraduate students wanting to work in the arts, with the Chazen Museum of Art being one of the inaugural participants in the program.

== Collections ==
European artists represented in the museum include Joan Miró, Auguste Rodin, Salvador Dalí, Barnaba da Modena, Barbara Hepworth, Jean Dufy, Andrea Vanni, Giorgio Vasari, René Magritte, Maurice Utrillo, Hubert Robert, Thomas Gainsborough, Albert Gleizes, Henry Moore, Benjamin Williams Leader, Eugène Boudin, and Maximilien Luce. The museum's collection of American artists includes Mark Rothko, Andy Warhol, Grandma Moses, many of Alexander Calder's works in several forms, and a copy of the Emancipation Memorial. Contemporary works by Shusaku Arakawa, David Klamen, Karen LaMonte, a collection of regionalist paintings by John Steuart Curry, Russian Social Realist paintings by Konstantin Vialov, Mikhail Avilov, and Klavdy Lebedev, glass art by René Lalique, and a representation of Japanese woodblock prints are also exhibited. The Van Vleck collection of Japanese woodblock prints remains a large portion of the museum's collection of works on paper.

Chamber concerts known as Sunday Afternoon Live from the Chazen (formerly Live at the Elvehjem) were broadcast from the museum by Wisconsin Public Radio until 2015 when WPR discontinued the program. The concert series continues on a monthly schedule as a live show with a webcast.

The Chazen Museum of Art is the official repository of Tandem Press, Madison, Wisconsin, a fine arts publisher. It archives one print from every edition that is published.

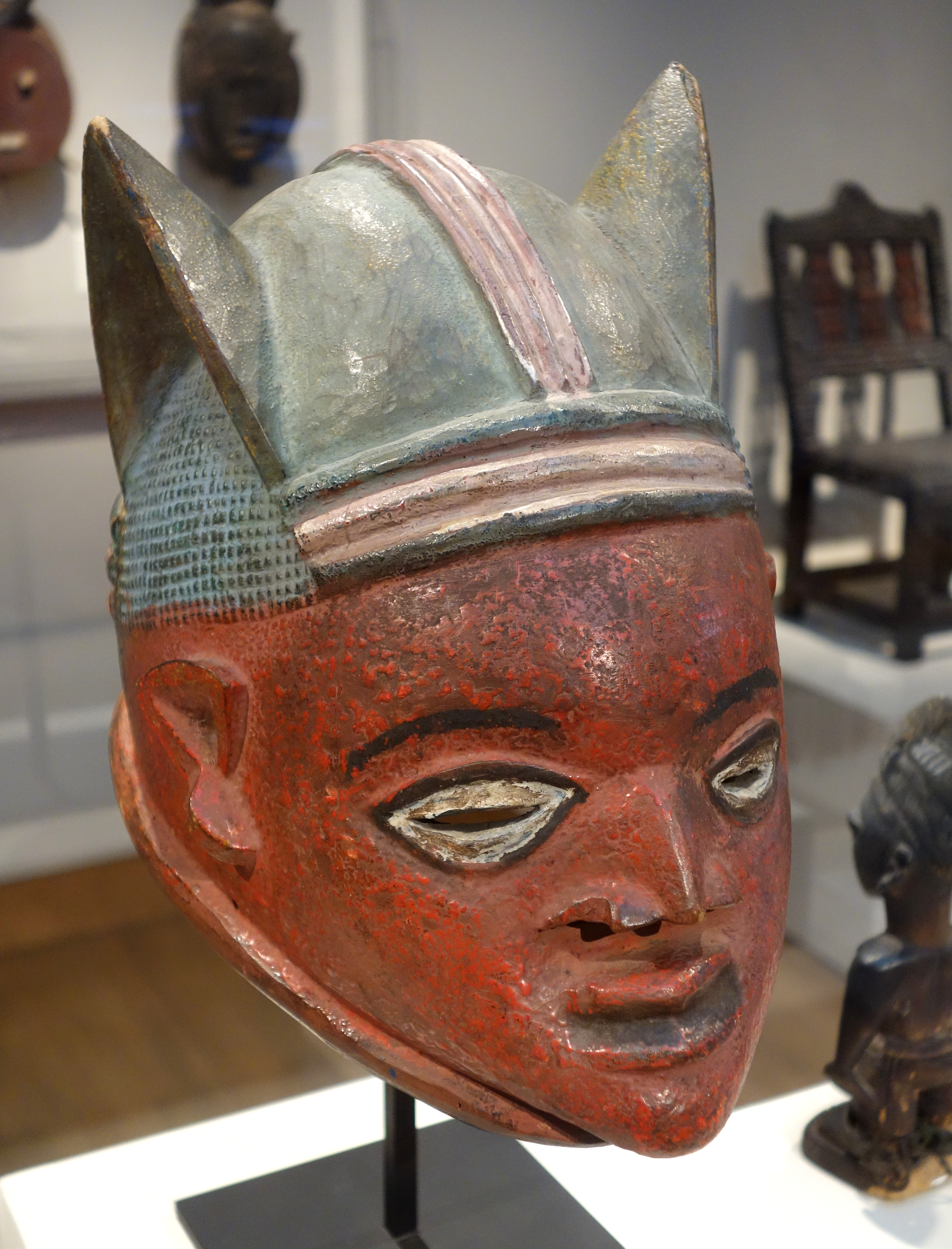
Yorùbá People (Nigeria), Gẹlẹdẹ Headdress, early 20th century

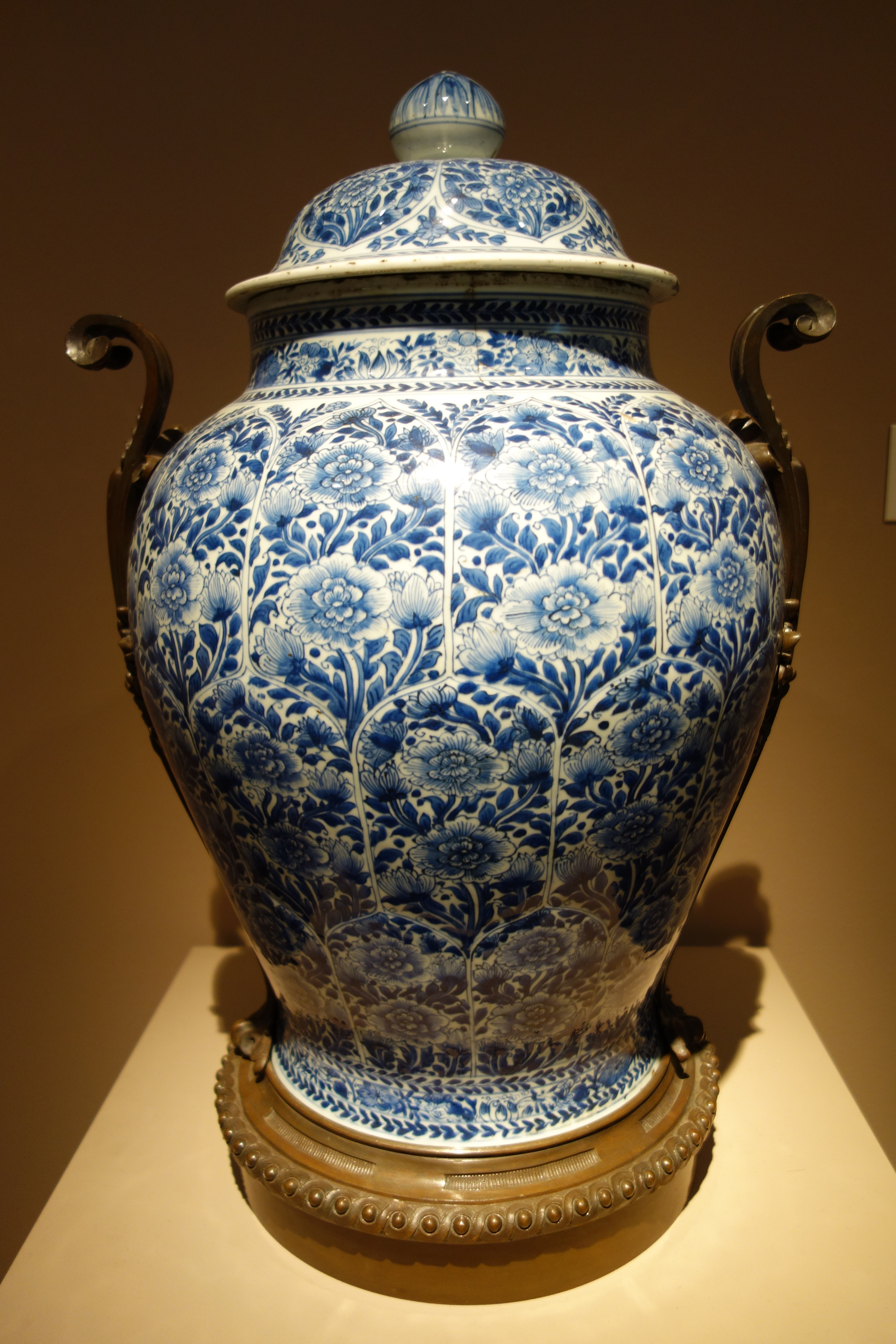
Chinese, Jar with Lid, Qing Dynasty (18th-19th centuries)

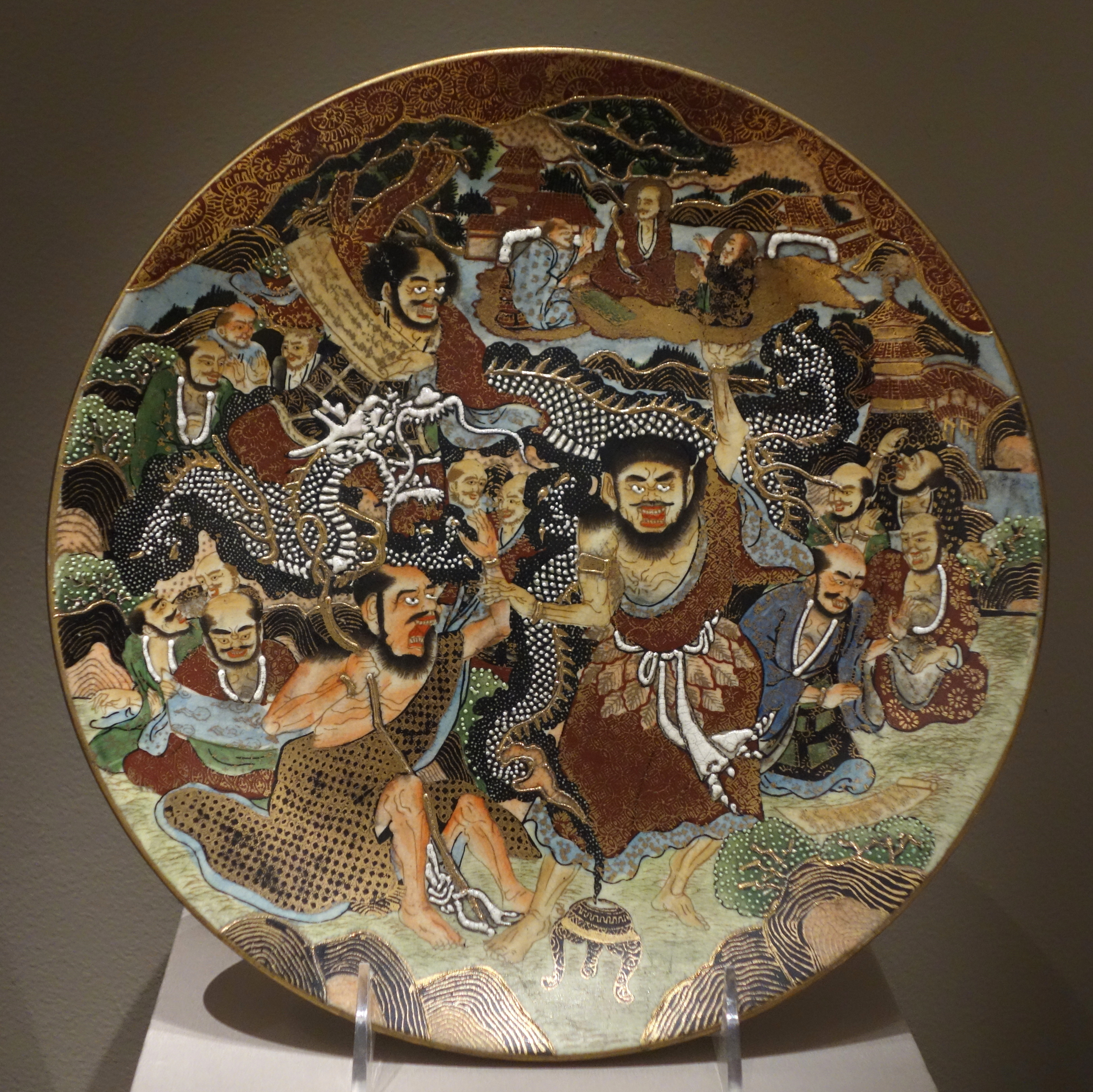
Jissei (Japan), Plate, n.d.

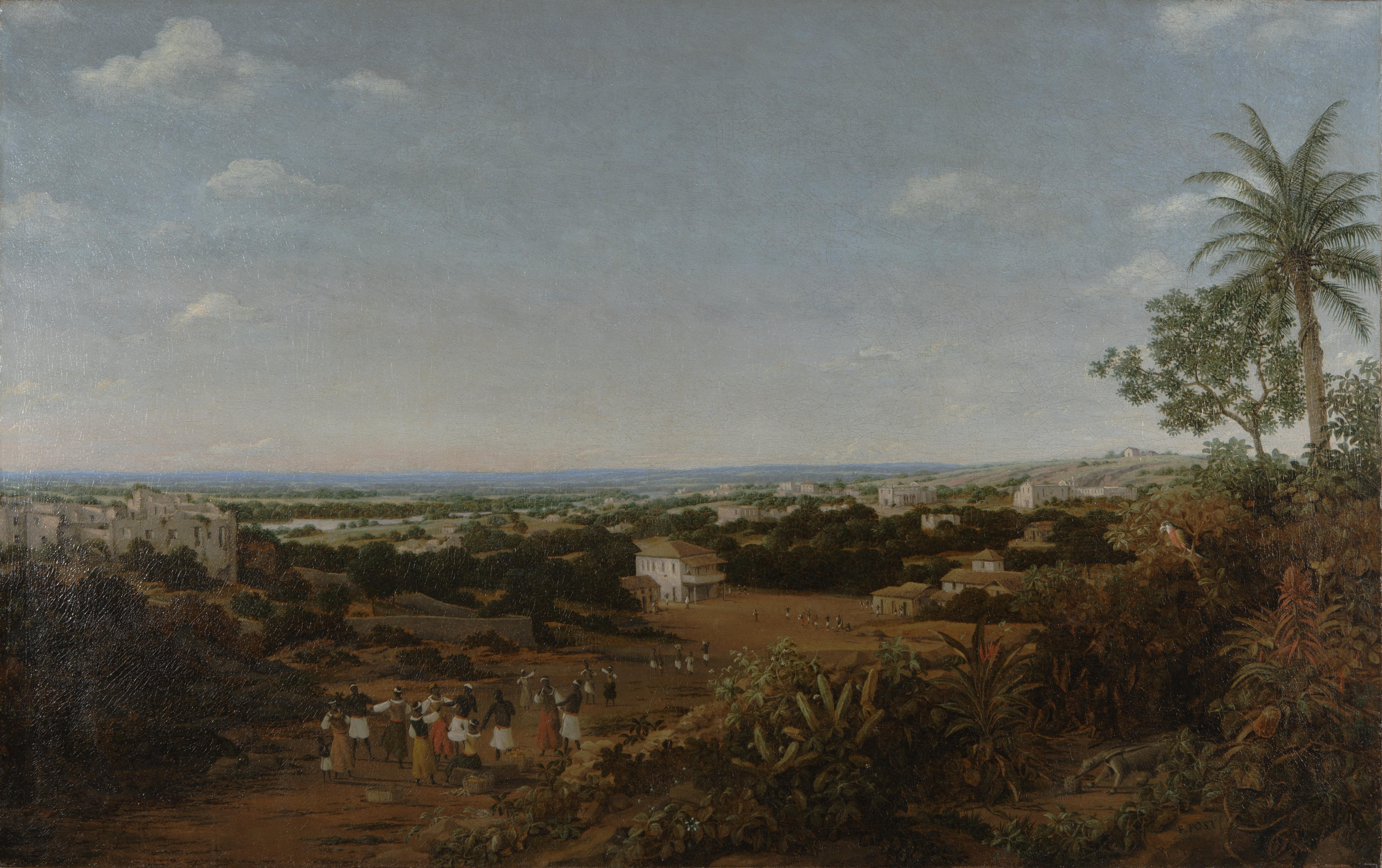
Frans Post, Village of Olinda, Brazil, c. 1660

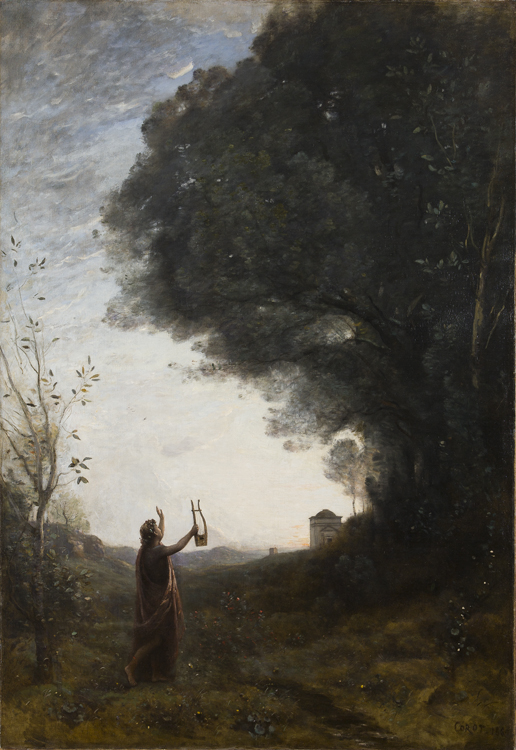
Jean-Baptiste-Camille Corot, Orpheus Greeting the Dawn, 1865

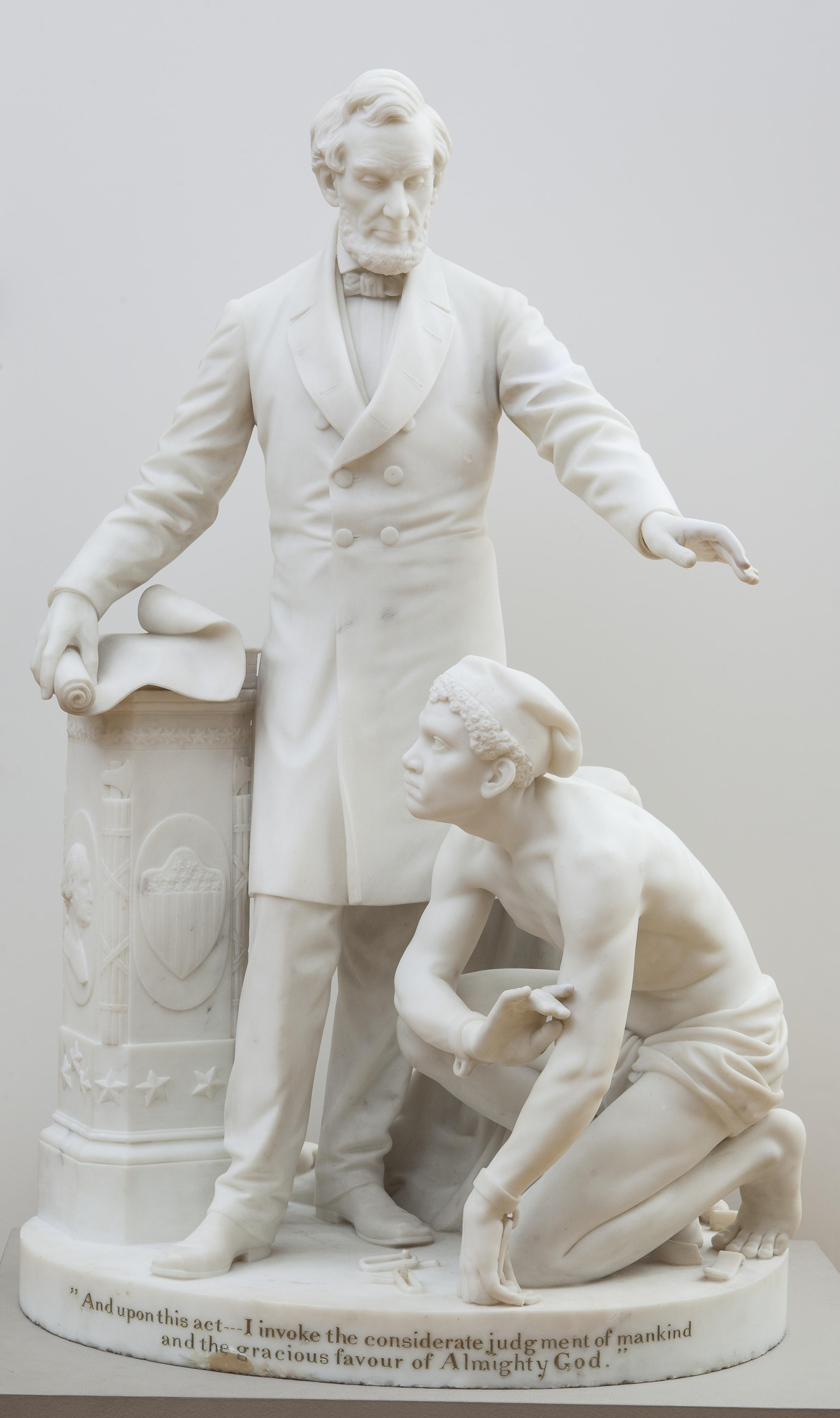
Thomas Ball, Emancipation Group, 1873

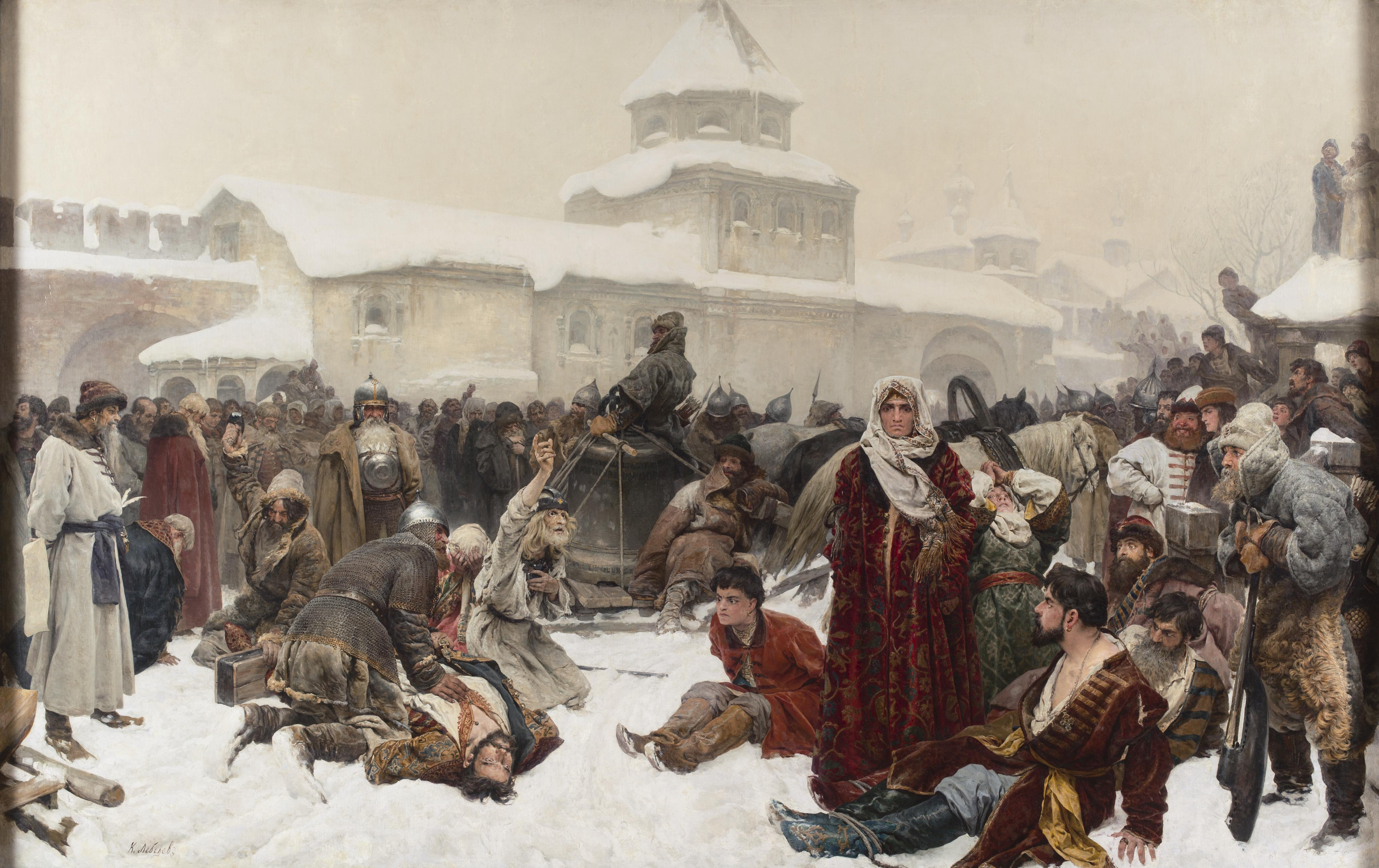
Klavdy Lebedev, The Fall of Novgorod, 1891

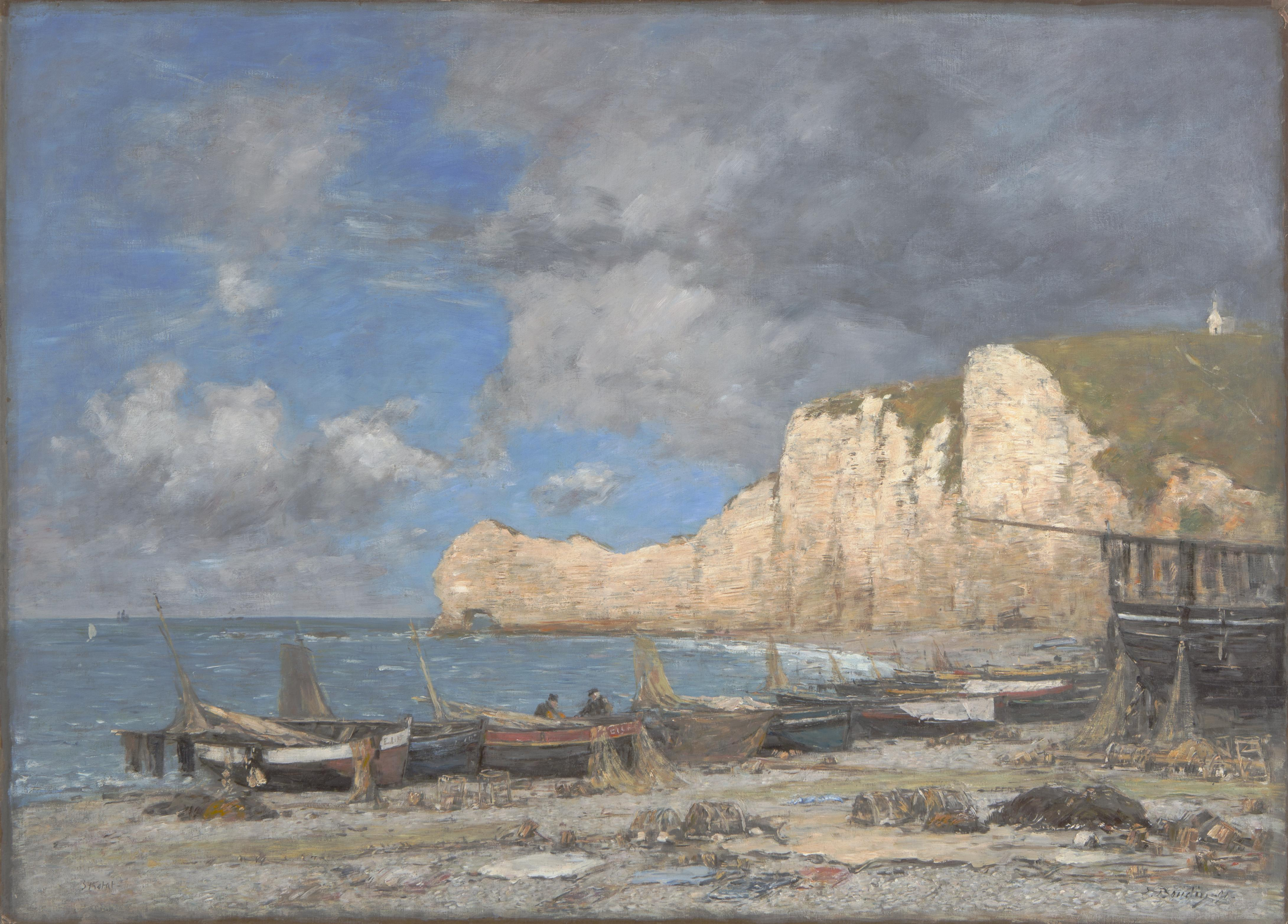
Eugène Boudin, Étretat, 1891

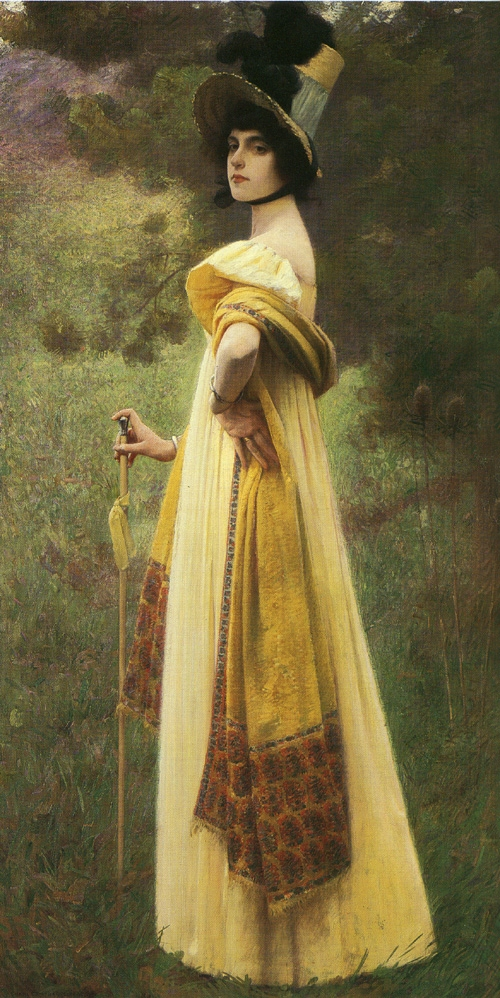
Charles Sprague Pearce, The Shawl, c. 1895-1900

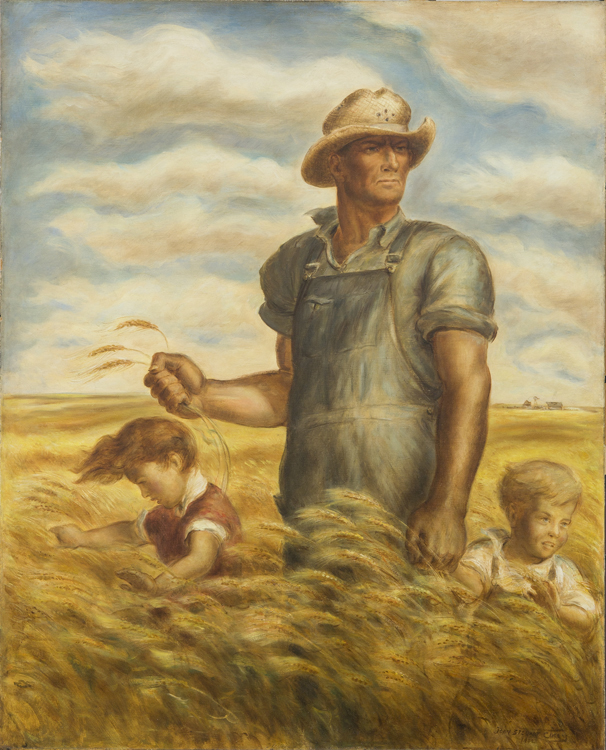
John Steuart Curry, Our Good Earth, 1942

== Governance ==
Directors

- 1967–1974: Millard F. Rogers Jr.
- 1974–1981: Eric S. McCready
- 1981–1983: Katherine Harper Mead
- 1983–1984: Stephen C. McGough (acting)
- 1984–2017: Russell Panczenko
- Since 2017: Amy Gilman
