= Nina Vatolina =

Soviet poster artist (1915–2002)

- Нина Ватолина
- Born: 1915; Kolomna, Russian Empire
- Died: 2002 (aged 86–87); Moscow, Russia
- Spouses: Nikolai Denisov (1934–1945); Max Avadevich Birshtein (m. 1945)

Nina Nikolaevicha Vatolina (Russian: Нина Николаевна Ватолина; 1915–2002) was a Soviet Russian poster artist. Active from the late 1930s into the 1960s, she has been called "formidably prolific" and credited with "some of the best" Soviet poster design in the era.

Her work is held at the Tate Modern and the Victoria and Albert Museum.

== Biography ==
Vatolina's 1941 poster, "Ne Boltai!" ( "Don't chatter! Gossiping borders on treason")

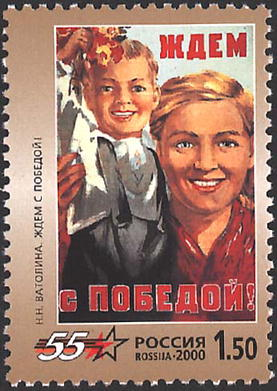
Stamp featuring Vatolina's art

Vatolina was born in Kolomna in 1915. She attended Ogiz Technical School for Arts (1932–1936) and the Moscow Art Institute (1937–1942). She also studied under Viktor Deni from 1935 to 1939. She had married Deni's son, Nikolai Denisov, in 1934, and the two studied together at the Moscow Art Institute while it was evacuated to Samarkand. The two would collaborate on posters for the duration of their marriage. Following her graduation, Vatolina returned to Moscow to produce posters, despite discouragement from authorities given the wartime conditions in the region.

Vatolina began making posters in the late 1930s, some of which encouraged participation in elections. During World War II, she and Denisov produced a number of posters for authorities. Her two most famous images, both produced in 1941 may be "Ne Boltai!" (English: Don’t Talk! or Don't Chatter!), which discouraged gossip to protect national security, and "Fascism, the Most Evil Enemy of Women", produced in reaction to the Nazi invasion of Russia. The poster featured a defiant woman based on Vatolina's neighbor. It was reprinted in 1942 to address a potential Nazi invasion of Azerbaijan, with the art undergoing edits to better represent Azerbaijani women. She continued to also work on posters promoting political unity and Stalinism for the remainder of the war.

In 1945, Vatolina divorced Denisov and married painter Max Avadevich Birshtein.

In the decades after the war, Vatolina produced posters to promote a variety of government initiatives, including those related to agriculture, children's lives and education, health and eugenics, industrialization and post-war reconstruction, international relations, and the development of Siberia. According to art critic Evgeny Peremyshlev, Vatolina often based the female figures in her art on herself.

Towards the end of her life, Vatolina said in interviews that she had always preferred painting over her post-World War II poster work, which she had produced out of obligation rather than passion.

== Exhibits ==
She had solo exhibitions of her work in Moscow in 1957 and 1968. :v

In the English-speaking world, Vatolina's posters were brought to light by British graphic designer and art collector David King, who donated a number of Soviet posters, among them Vatolina's, to the Tate Modern. Her posters were also featured in the Tate's 2017 exhibit, "Red Star Over Russia: A Revolution in Visual Culture 1905–55".

== Publications ==
- We Are Posters (1962)
- Walking the Tretiakov Gallery (1976)
- Landscapes of Moscow (1983)
