= Boris Yefimov =

Russian political cartoonist (1900–2008)

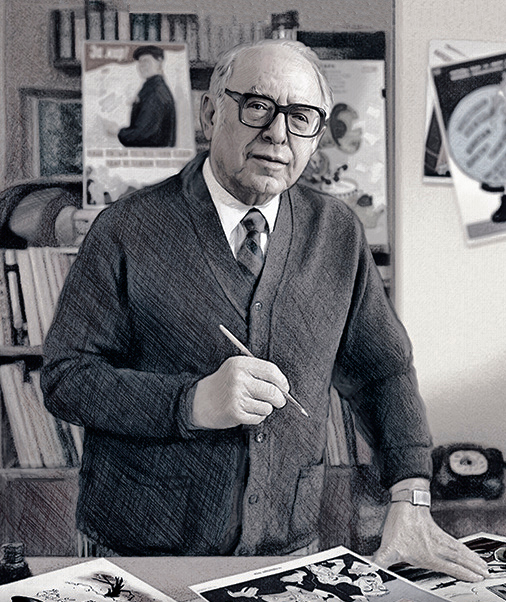
- Born: Boris Khaimovich Fridlyand; 11 October [O.S. 28 September] 1900 Kyiv, Kiev Governorate, Russian Empire
- Died: 1 October 2008 (aged 108) Moscow, Russia

Boris Yefimovich Yefimov (né Fridlyand; Russian: Борис Ефимович Ефимов; 11 October [O.S. 28 September] 1900 – 1 October 2008) was a Soviet and Russian political cartoonist best known for his critical political caricatures of Adolf Hitler and other Nazis produced before and during the Second World War, and was the chief illustrator of the newspaper Izvestia. During his 90-year career he produced more than 70,000 drawings.

== Early life ==
Yefimov was born in Kyiv on 11 October 1900, as Boris Fridlyand, the second son of a Jewish shoemaker. His father was Khaim Movshevich (Yefim Moiseyevich) Fridlyand (1860–1945); his mother was Rokhlya Shevakhovna (Rakhil Savelyevna) (1880–1969). Shortly after his birth, his family moved to Białystok, where he grew up alongside his older brother Mikhail (who became the famous journalist Mikhail Koltsov, arrested during the Great Purge and executed in 1940). During the First World War, his family fled the advancing German armies and returned to Kyiv, where he pursued legal studies. He began to express his emotions through caricatures of politicians, the first of which were published in 1919 and circulated in the Kievan Red Army.

== Career ==
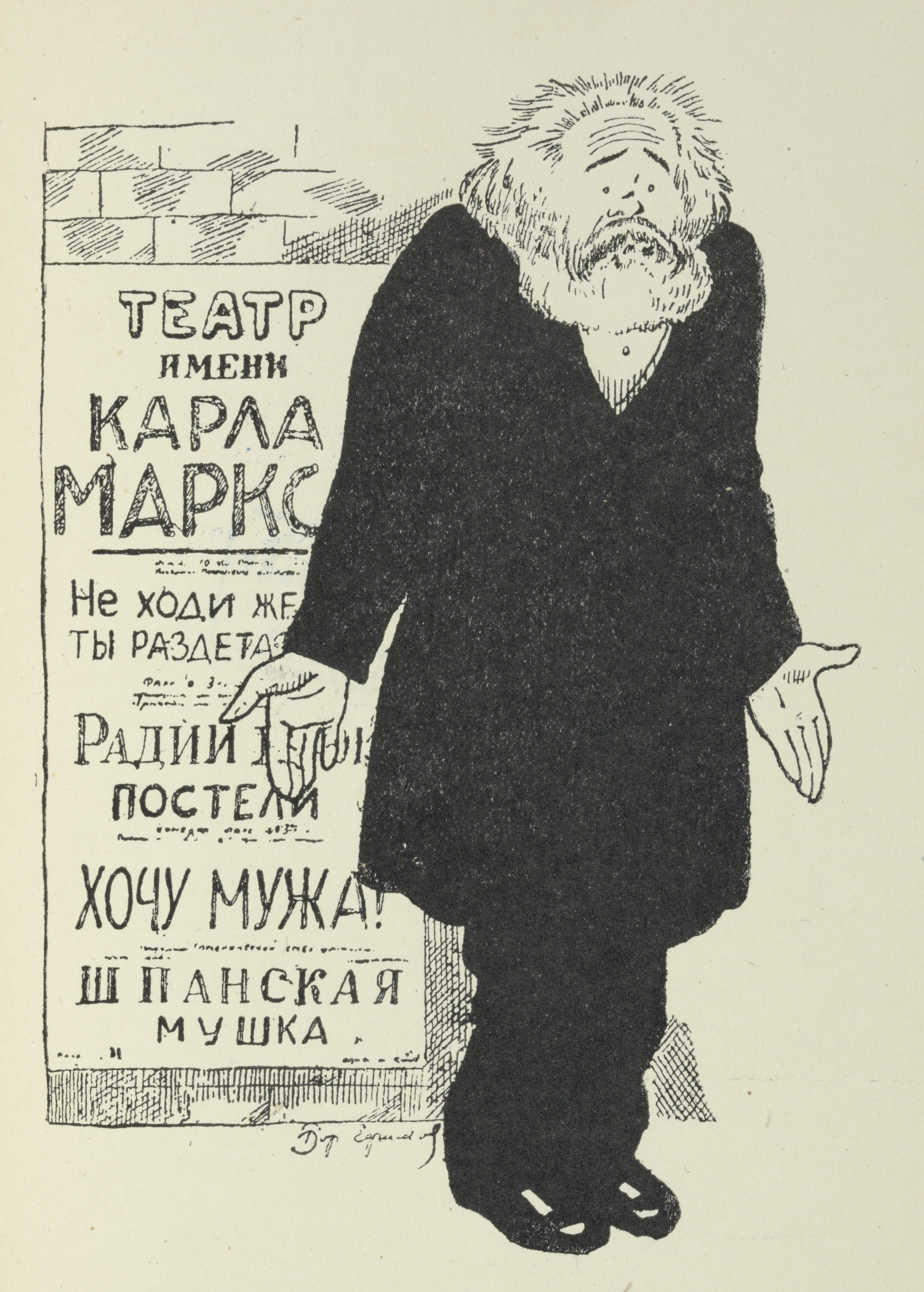
"Karl Marks, I swear to God, never wrote such things" by Yefimov (1924)

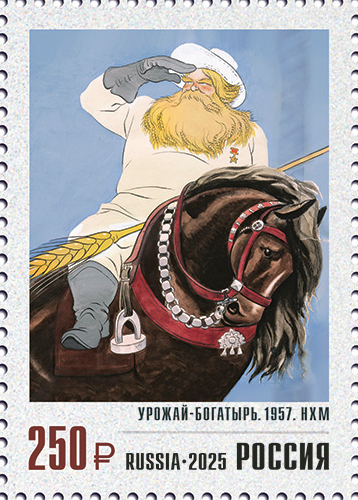
"Harvest-bogatyr" by Yefimov (1957) on a 2025 stamp of Russia

From 1920 to 1921, Yefimov designed posters and brochures for the communist organization Agitprop, finally moving to Moscow in 1922 after his brother, who worked as an editor for Pravda, offered him a job drawing political cartoons. His artistic talent, directed mainly against the West, gained him prominence, and his work started appearing in such titles as Izvestia, Krokodil and Ogoniok, a magazine founded by his brother Mikhail Koltsov (1898–1940). The year 1924 saw the publication of his first book, Political Cartoons (Russian: Политические карикатуры, Politicheskiye Karikatury), which included a foreword by Leon Trotsky.

In 1937 Boris Yefimov covered the Show Trials and drew cartoons against people like Nikolai Bukharin and Leon Trotsky. During this period Yefimov drew political cartoons against those he had previously admired within the Soviet leadership.

Following the war, Yefimov traveled to the Nuremberg trials with the task of caricaturing the Nazi defendants. He was then ordered to poke fun at the Western powers in what was transforming into the Cold War. He went on to become the chief editor of Agitprop, and cooperated with Pravda until the 1980s. He published an autobiography, Moy Vek (My Century), for his centennial, and resided in Moscow.

Yefimov received the Stalin Prizes in 1950 and 1951 and was named People's Painter of the USSR in 1967. In 2002 he became chief of the Political Propaganda Department of the Russian Academy of Arts. In his old age, his vision began to deteriorate. In 1999, he underwent cataract surgery, which at least partially restored the vision in his right eye.

== Later life and death ==
In a 2005 interview with Russian TV, Yefimov recalled his experiences in Petrograd during the Russian Revolution, admitting that he had changed his real name in order to conceal his Jewish origins.

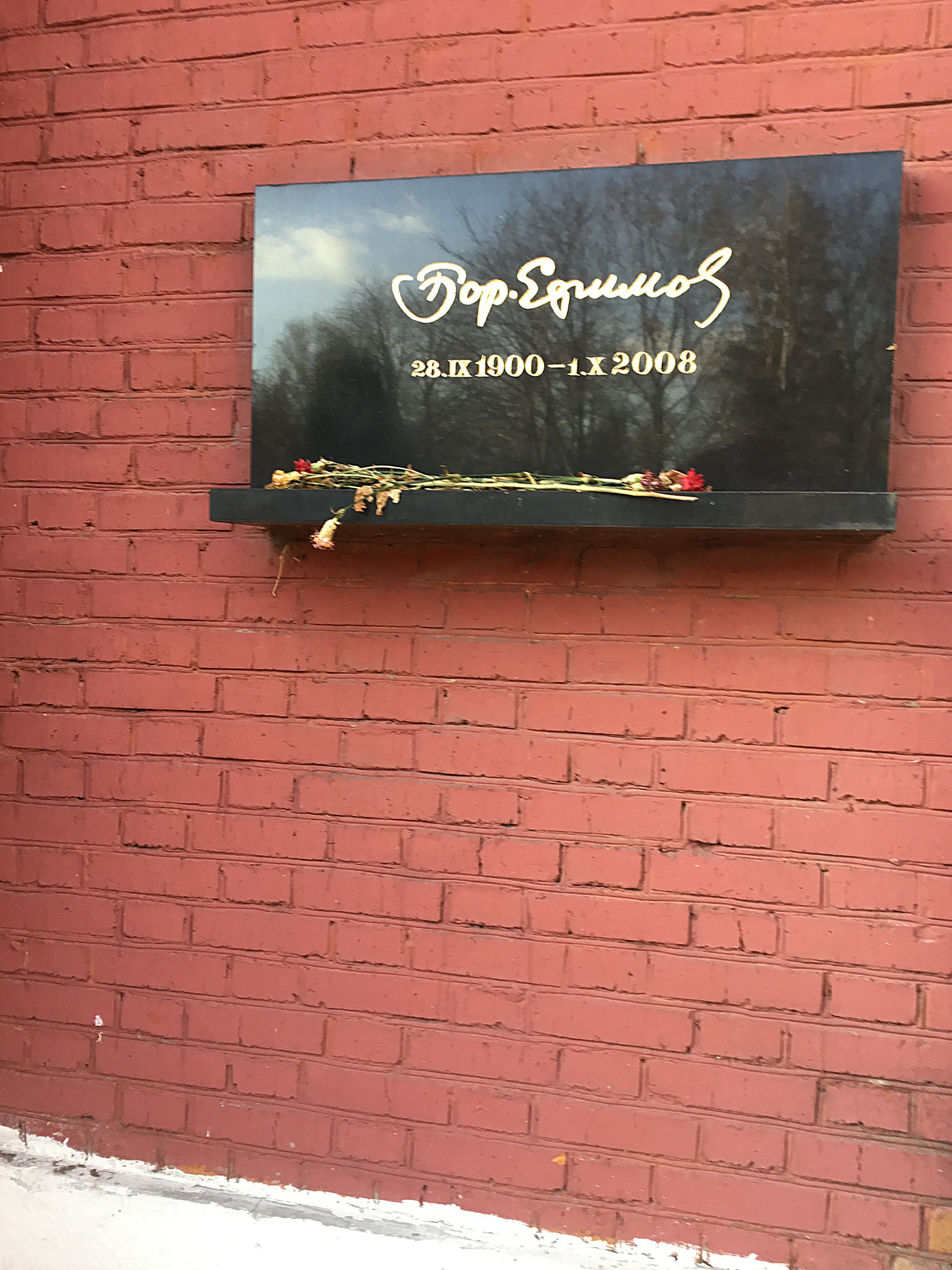
Burial site of Boris Yefimov at Novodevichy Cemetery.

On 28 September 2007, his 107th birthday, he was appointed to the post of the chief artist of the Izvestia newspaper. In 2008, Yefimov was still working, primarily writing memoirs and drawing friendly cartoons. Also, he was active in public life: he attended memorials and anniversary meetings, soirees and other functions up until his death in Moscow on 1 October 2008, only three days after what was initially reported as his 108th birthday; his age was subsequently reported as 109 based on information from his family. However, records back up that he was born in 1900. Boris Yefimov is buried in Novodevichy Cemetery.

== Family ==
Yefimov was married twice. His first wife was Rosaliya Borisovna Koretskaya (1900–1969). He was survived by his son Mikhail (born in 1929), a grandson, and two great grandchildren.

He was a cousin of the famous Soviet photographer and journalist Semyon Fridlyand.

== Bibliography ==
Norris, Stephen (2 April 2010). "Cartoon allies". Russia Beyond the Headlines. Archived from the original on 20 September 2020.

== Books in English ==
- Hitler and his Gang. Cartoons by Boris Efimov with a foreword by David Low. Alliance Press, 1944.

== See also ==
- List of Soviet poster artists
