= List of Soviet poster artists =

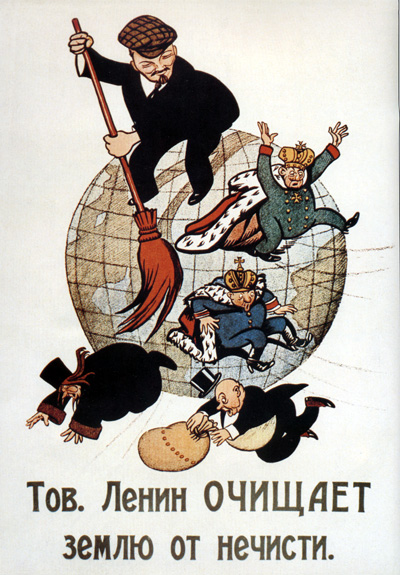
"Comrade Lenin Cleanses the Earth of Filth" by Viktor Deni

This is a list of Soviet poster artists.

== Soviet poster artists ==
- Mikhail Baljasnij
- Mikhail Cheremnykh
- Nikolai Chomov
- Viktor Deni
- Nikolai Dolgorukov
- Boris Efimov
- Vladimir Galb
- Iulii Ganf
- Frantisek Gross
- Viktor Semyonovich Ivanov
- Alexey Kokorekin
- Viktor Koretsky
- Gustav Klutsis
- Valentina Kulagina
- Karel Ludwig
- Vladimir Mayakovsky
- Iurii Merkulov
- Dmitry Moor
- Sergei Senkin
- Konstantin Vialov

=== Groups ===
- Brigade KGK3 (Viktor Koretsky, Vera Gitsevich, Boris Knoblok)

== See also ==
- Agitprop
- Photomontage
- Constructivism (art)
