= Sergei Senkin =

- Born: July 13, 1894; Moscow, Russian Empire
- Died: April 12, 1963 (aged 68); Moscow, Russian SFSR
- Education: Vkhutemas
- Occupations: Artist, photographer, illustrator
- Style: Suprematism, constructivism

Sergei Yakovlevich Senkin (1894–1963) was a twentieth-century Russian artist, photographer, and illustrator.

Senkin studied with Kasimir Malevitch during the 1920s in Vkhutemas. He sometimes visited Malevitch in Vitebsk with his friend Gustav Klutsis. There, he developed his own approach to Suprematism. He used a variety of artistic techniques such as graphic and poster design, photography and photomontage as well as painting. He worked together with Gustav Klutsis on agitational posters in 1922-1937.

In 1928, he joined the Constructivist October Group. The same year, Senkin collaborated with artist and architect El Lissitzky to create the frieze for the Pressa exhibition in Cologne, Germany.

== Gallery ==
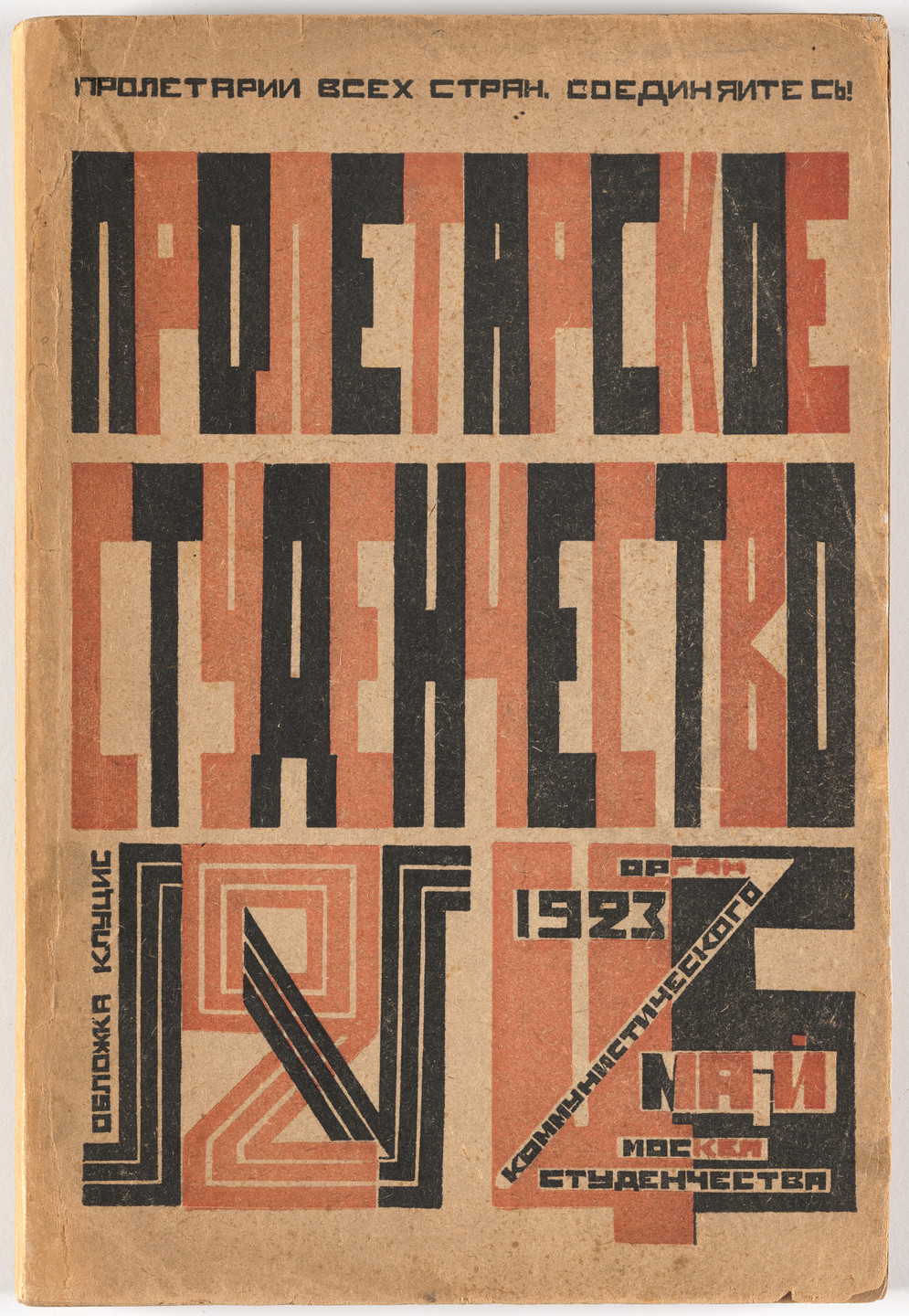
Second edition of Proletarian Student, a 1923 journal by Senkin and Gustav Klutsis

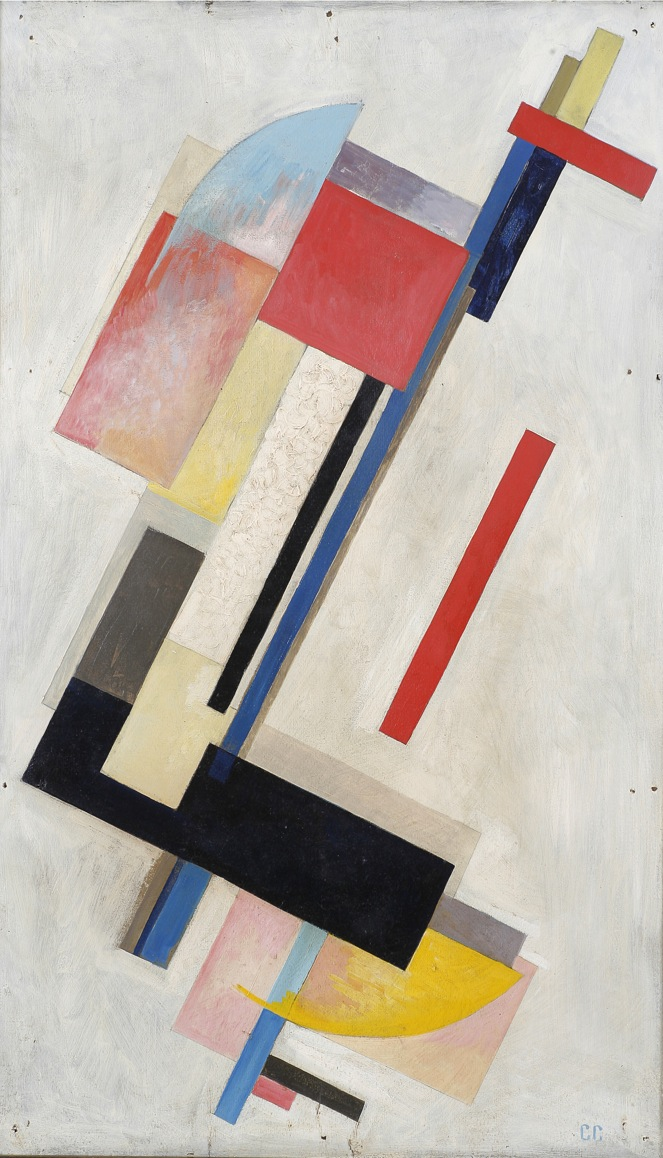
Non Objective Composition (1921)

== See also ==
- List of Soviet poster artists
- Photomontage
- Constructivism (art)
