= Dmitry Moor =

Russian painter (1883–1946)

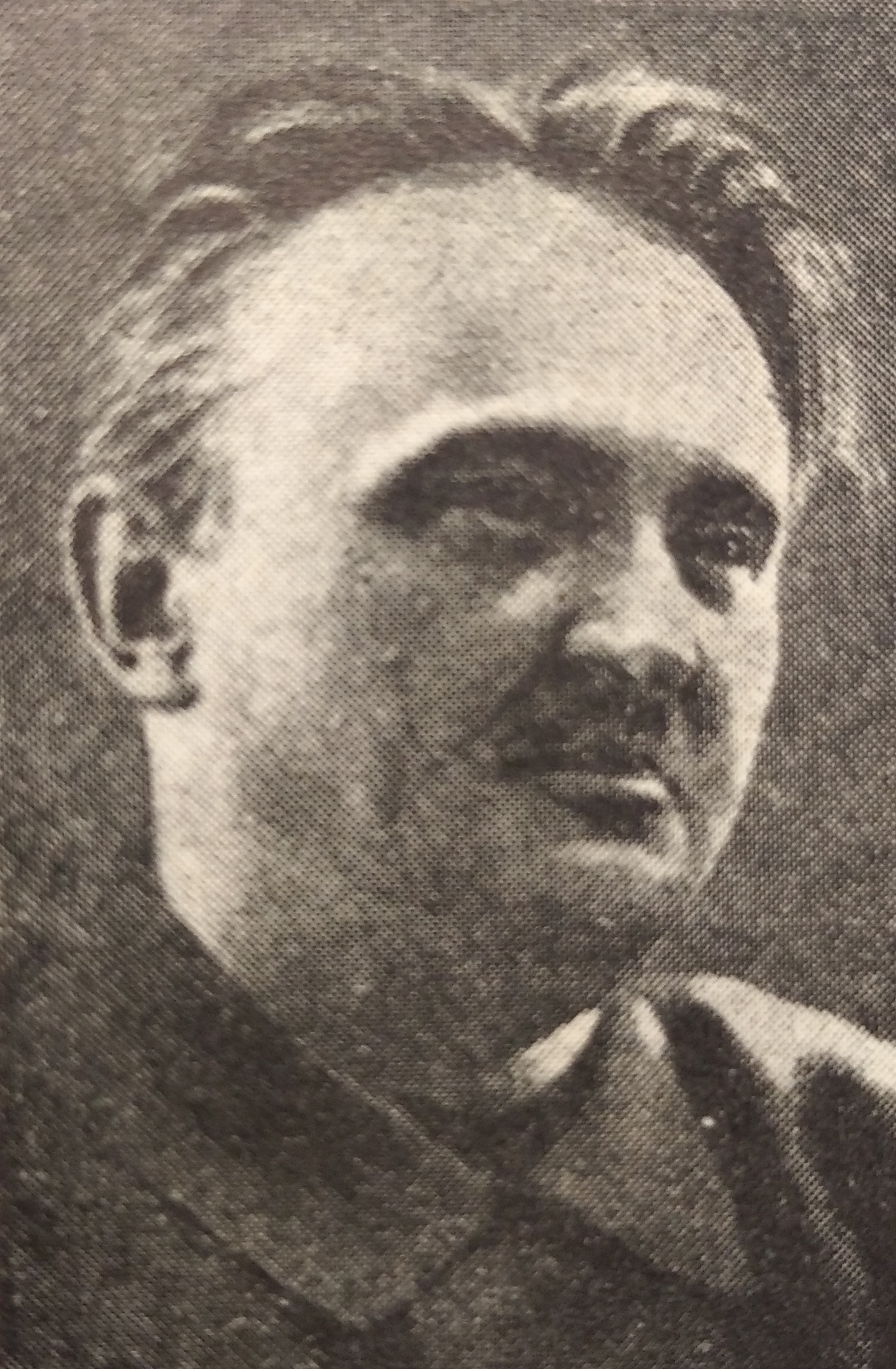
D. Moor in 1933

D. Moor (Russian: Д. Моор) was the professional name of Dmitry Stakhievich Orlov (Russian: Дмитрий Стахиевич Орлов; 3 November 1883 in Novocherkassk – 24 October 1946 in Moscow), a Russian artist noted for his propaganda posters. The pseudonym "Moor" was taken from the name of the protagonists in Friedrich Schiller's play The Robbers.

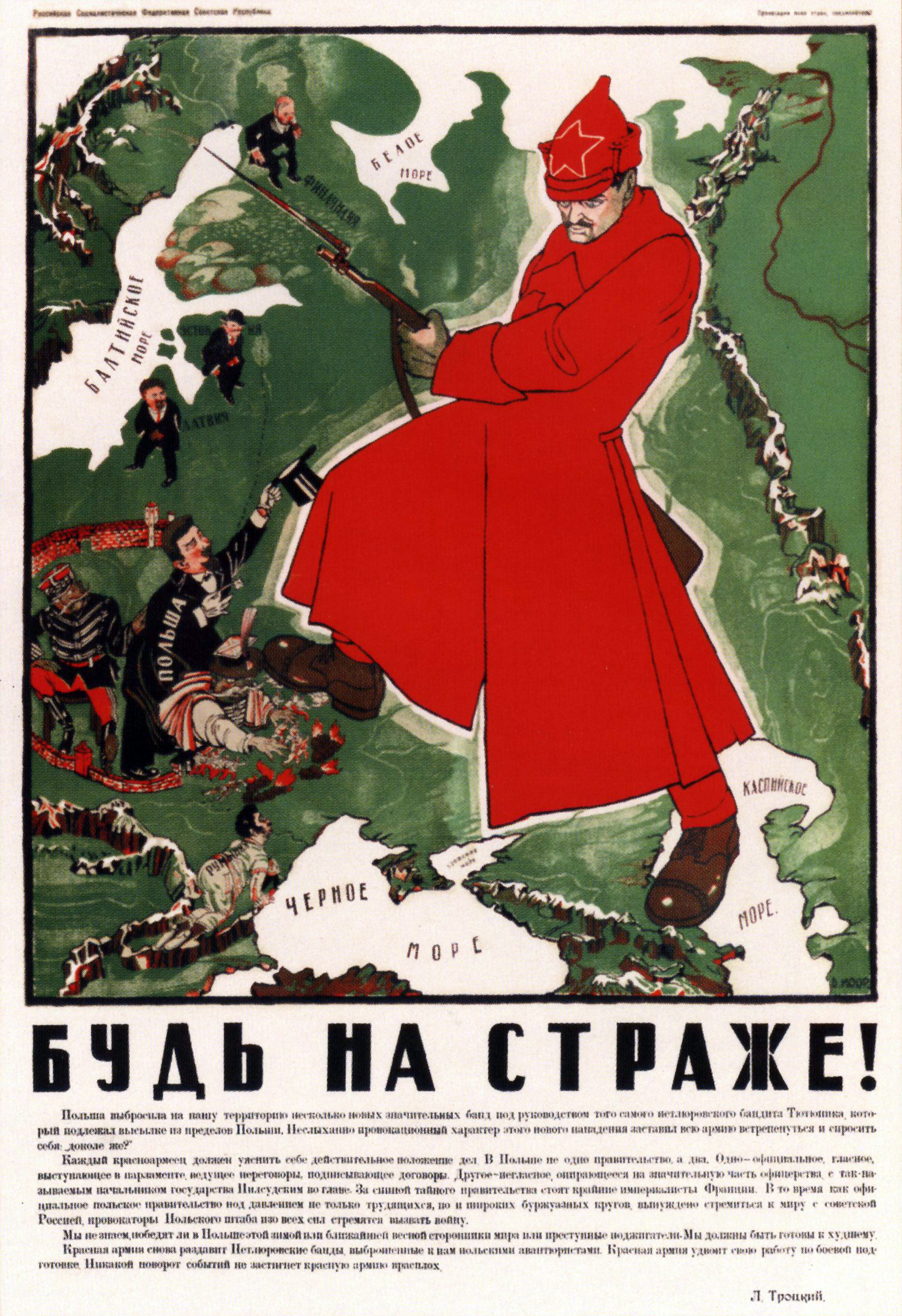
Be on Guard! propaganda poster, depicting a red cavalryman in the Polish-Soviet War, with text by Trotsky.

He was also the chief artist for the Bezbozhnik ("The godless") magazine.

== See also ==
- List of Soviet poster artists
