= Konstantin Vialov =

Soviet artist

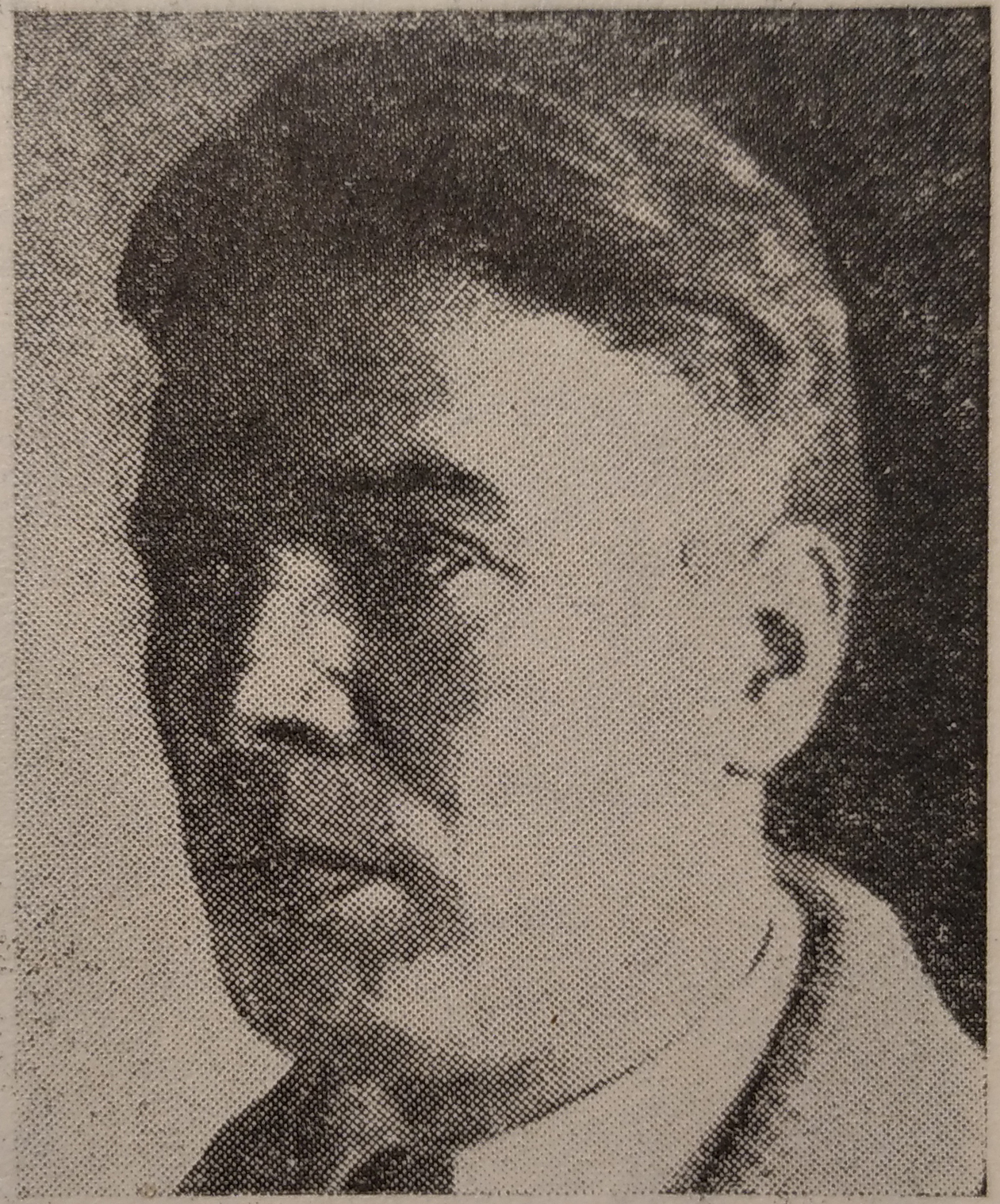
Konstantin Aleksandrovich Vialov

Konstantin Aleksandrovich Vialov (1900–1976) was a 20th-century Russian artist.

== Biography ==
Vialov studied textile design at the Stroganov Moscow State Academy of Arts and Industry, Russia from 1914 to 1917. After the Russian Revolution, he continued his studies at the state art and technical schools Svomas and Vkhutemas, studying under Wassily Kandinsky, Vladimir Tatlin, Aristarkh Lentulov, and David Shterenberg.

From 1922 to 1925, Vialov served as head of the Studio of Visual Arts for Teenagers, operated by Narkompros. Vialov joined the Artists' Union of the USSR in 1932, the year of its founding, and from 1941 to 1945 he designed a series of posters for the Telegraph Agency of the Soviet Union (TASS), which were exhibited at the Art Institute of Chicago in 2011 as part of the exhibition Windows on the War: Soviet TASS Posters at Home and Abroad, 1941–1945. Vialov died in Moscow in 1976.

Vialov painted the following paintings-River Transport in Aid of the Front, All Hail the Soviet Fleet, and Hail the Fighting Tribe.

== See also ==
- List of Soviet poster artists
- Photomontage
- Constructivism (art)
