= October Group (constructivism) =

The October Group was a collective of constructivist artists active in the Soviet Union from 1928 to 1932.

The artists involved include:

- Gustav Klutsis
- Alexander Rodchenko
- Sergei Eisenstein
- El Lissitzky
- Aleksei Gan
- Sergei Senkin
- Solomon Telingater
- Leonid Vesnin, Victor Vesnin, and Alexander Vesnin
